= Timothy Walsh (architect) =

American architect (1868–1934)

Timothy Francis Walsh FAIA
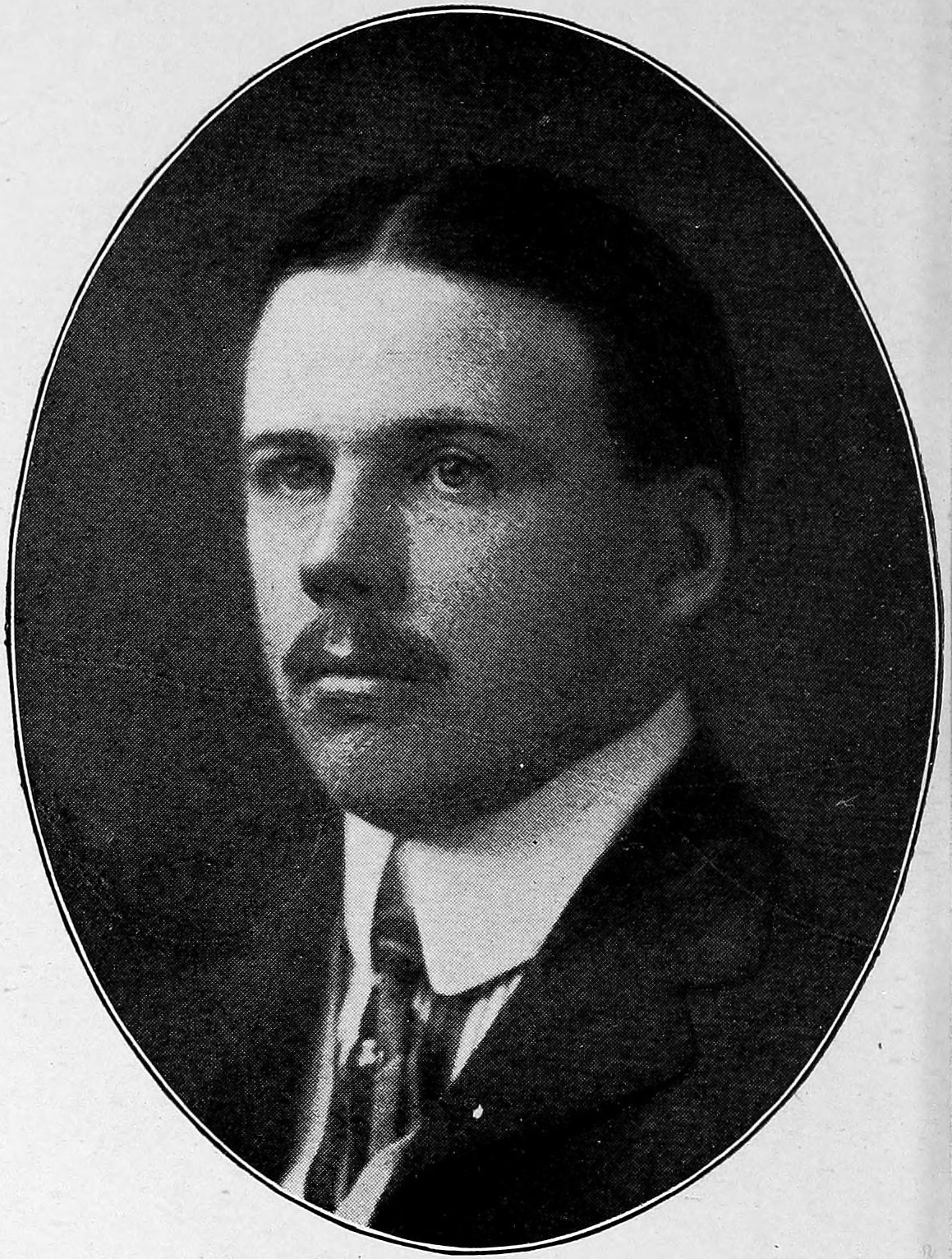
- Born: November 8, 1868; Cambridge, Massachusetts, U.S.
- Died: July 7, 1934 (aged 65); North Scituate, Massachusetts, U.S.
- Burial place: Holyhood Cemetery
- Education: The English High School (1886)
- Occupation: Architect
- Spouse: Marian Adams Wright (m. 1899)
- Relatives: James Anthony Walsh (brother)
- Practice: Maginnis, Walsh and Sullivan; Maginnis & Walsh

Timothy Francis Walsh FAIA (November 8, 1868 – July 7, 1934) was an American architect and partner in the firm Maginnis, Walsh and Sullivan and Maginnis & Walsh who designed more than 115 ecclesiastical buildings and numerous university buildings over the course of his career.

== Biography ==
Timothy Francis Walsh was born November 8, 1868, in Cambridge, Massachusetts, to James Walsh and Hanna Shea. His brother, James Anthony Walsh, was the co-founder of Maryknoll Fathers and Brothers.

Walsh attended The English High School in Boston and graduated in 1886. In 1887, Walsh worked as a draftsman for Peabody and Stearns and worked at the firm until 1893 when he left to study in Europe. He studied in Paris atiliers, where received his professional education. Walsh returned to Boston in 1895 and formed a partnership named Walsh & Kearns which lasted for about a year. From 1896 to 1897, Walsh worked as a solo practitioner, and in 1898 went into partnership with Charles Donagh Maginnis and Matthew Sullivan named Maginnis, Walsh and Sullivan. This partnership lasted until 1905, when Sullivan left the partnership. Maginnis and Walsh remained partners of the firm under the name Maginnis & Walsh until Walsh's death in 1934.

Journalist Lucien Price wrote that Walsh "was a remarkable designer, a water colorist of distinction, one of several famous architects trained in the office of Peabody and Stearns, and a lover no less of life than of his art." Walsh was chairman and president of the Boston Board of Appeal. He was also a member of the Boston Society of Architects, the Boston Architectural Club, and the Charitable Irish Society of Boston. Walsh became a member of the American Institute of Architects in 1901 and was elected a fellow in 1925.

In 1899, Walsh married Marian Adams Wright and together had three daughters and a son. Walsh died on July 7, 1934, at his summer home in North Scituate, Massachusetts, and was buried at Holyhood Cemetery in Brookline, Massachusetts.

== Notable works ==
=== Maginnis, Walsh and Sullivan ===
- St. John the Evangelist Church (1905), Cambridge, Massachusetts
- St. Thomas the Apostle Catholic Church (1905), Los Angeles, California

=== Maginnis & Walsh ===
- St. Mary's School (1907), Taunton, Massachuesetts
- Boston College (1908), Chestnut Hill, Massachusetts
- All Saints Catholic Church (1910), Stuart, Iowa
- St. Aidan's Church (1911), Brookline, Massachusetts
- Regis High School (1914), New York City, New York
- Basilica of the National Shrine of the Immaculate Conception (1920), Washington, D.C.
- Trinity Washington University's Notre Dame Chapel (1924), Washington, D.C.
- St. Augustin Catholic Church (1924), Des Moines, Iowa
- Basilica of St. John (1927), Des Moines, Iowa
- Cathedral of St. Mary of the Assumption Rectory (1927), Fall River, Massachusetts
- Basilica of the Immaculate Conception (1928), Waterbury, Connecticut
- St. Vincent de Paul Catholic Church (1930), Bayonne, New Jersey
- Alumni Hall (1931), University of Notre Dame, Notre Dame, Indiana
- Dillon Hall (1931), University of Notre Dame, Notre Dame, Indiana
- Sacred Heart School (1931), Fall River, Massachusetts
- Our Lady of Sorrows Catholic Church (1932), Rock Springs, Wyoming
- Zahm Hall (1937), University of Notre Dame, Notre Dame, Indiana
- Breen-Phillips Hall (1939), University of Notre Dame, Notre Dame, Indiana
- St. Andrew Church (1939), New York City, New York
- Fulton Hall (1947) Carroll School of Management, Boston College, Chestnut Hill, Massachusetts
- St. Mary's Cathedral (1952), Ogdensburg, New York
- Campion Hall (1954), Boston College, Chestnut Hill, Massachusetts
- Boston Consumptives Hospital, Mattapan, Boston, Massachusetts

== Gallery ==
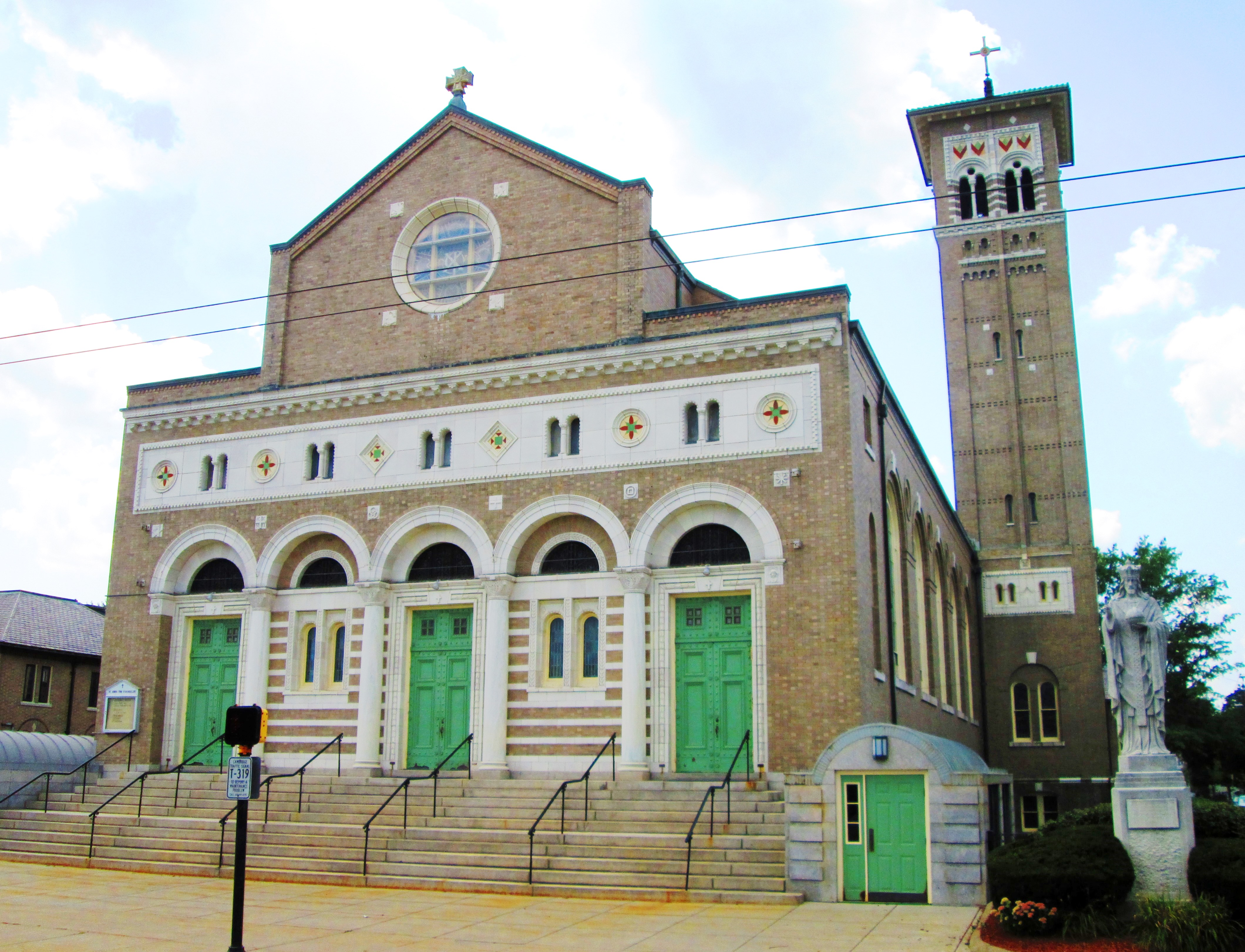
St. John the Evangelist Church

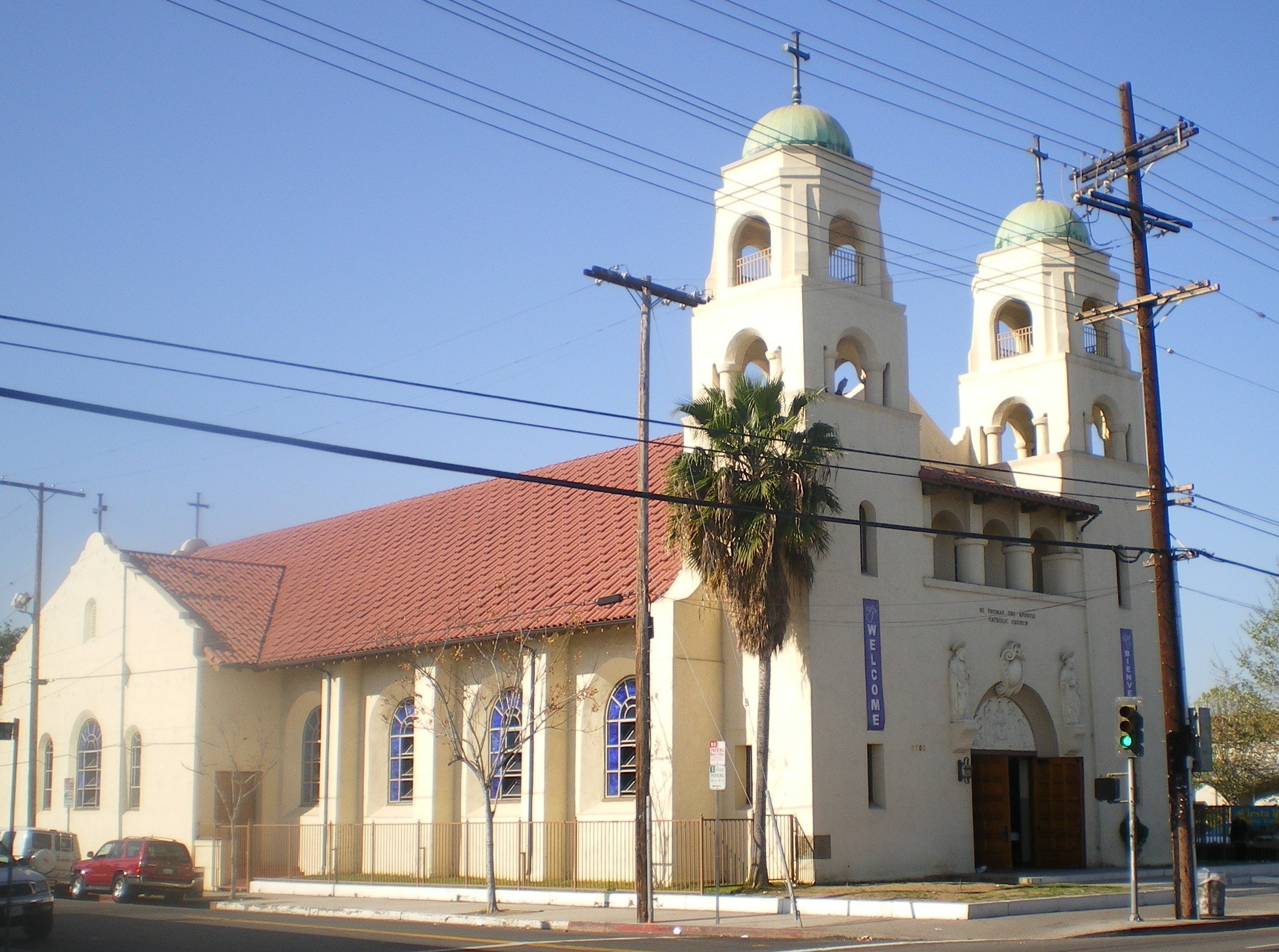
St. Thomas the Apostle Catholic Church

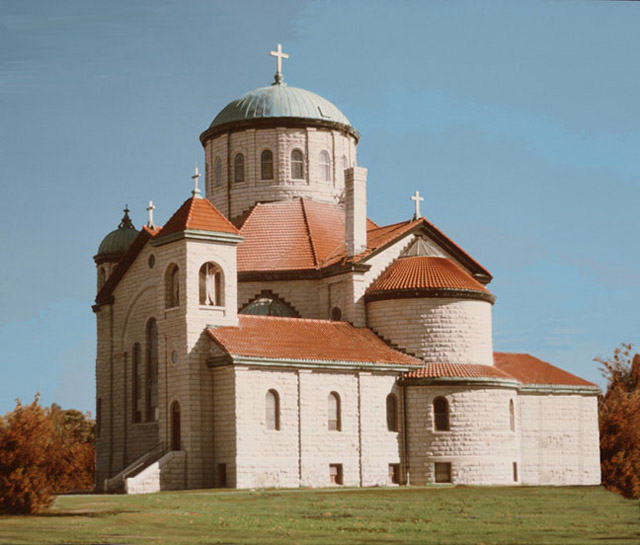
All Saints Catholic Church

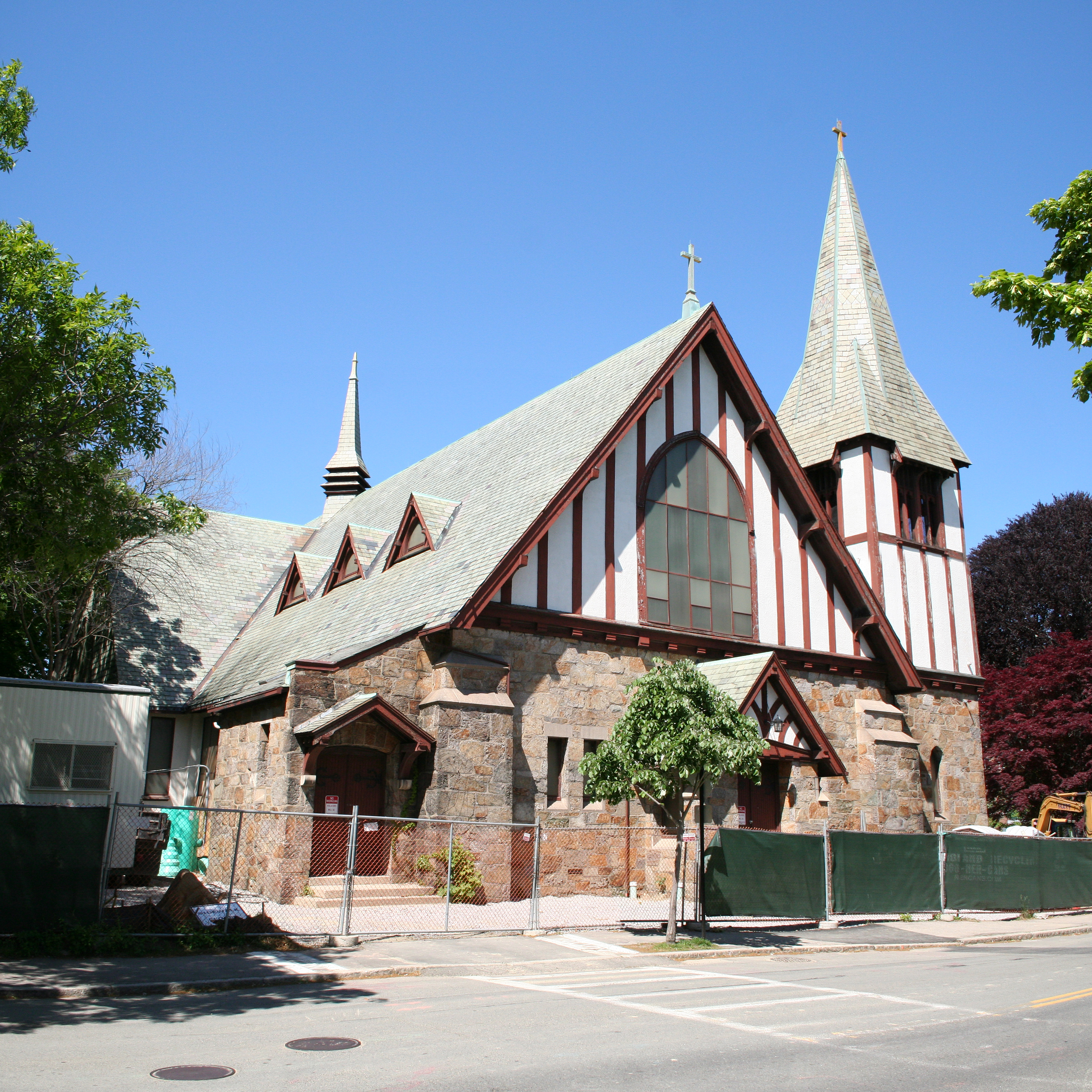
St. Aidan's Church

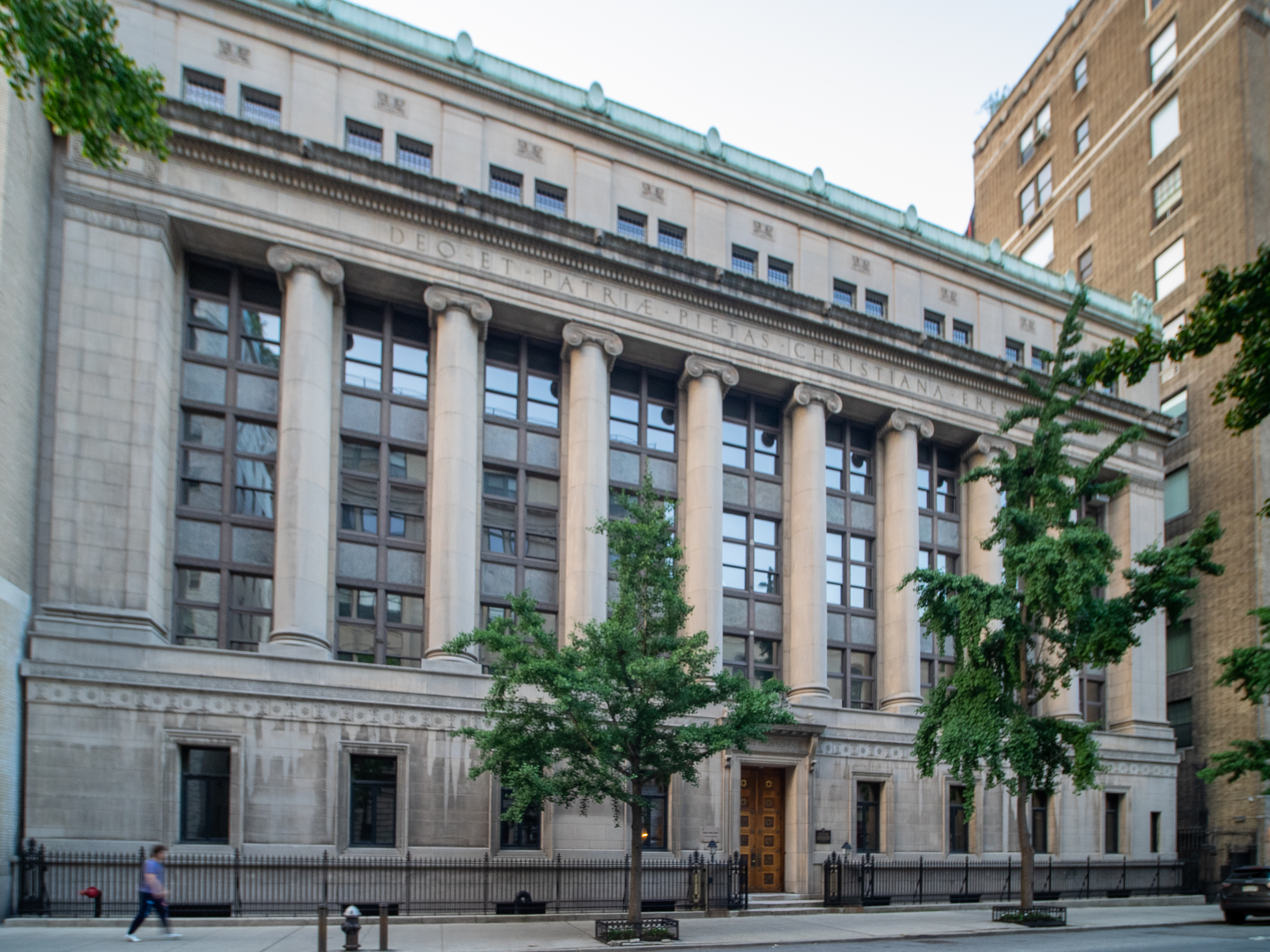
Regis High School

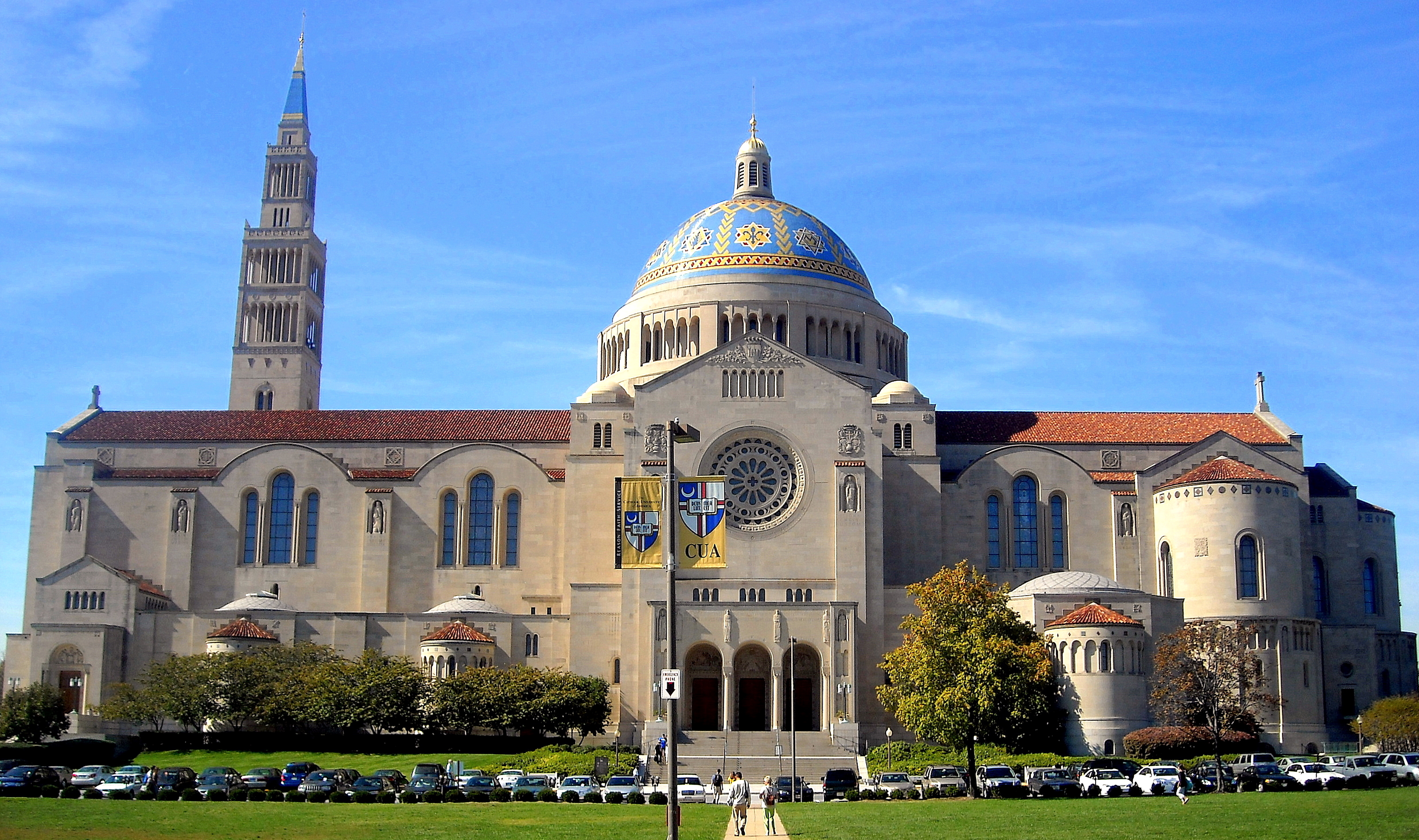
Basilica of the National Shrine of the Immaculate Conception

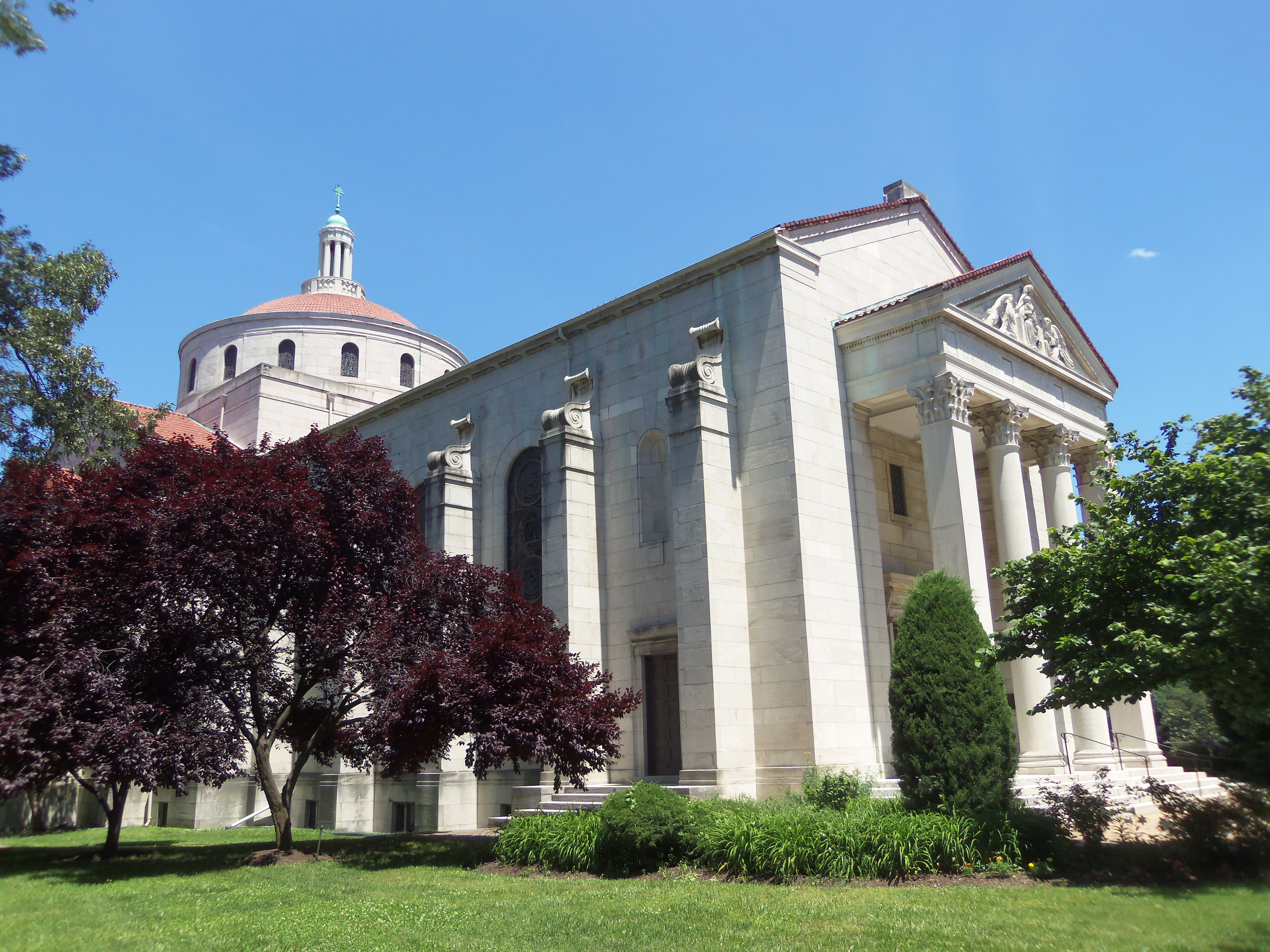
Notre Dame Chapel

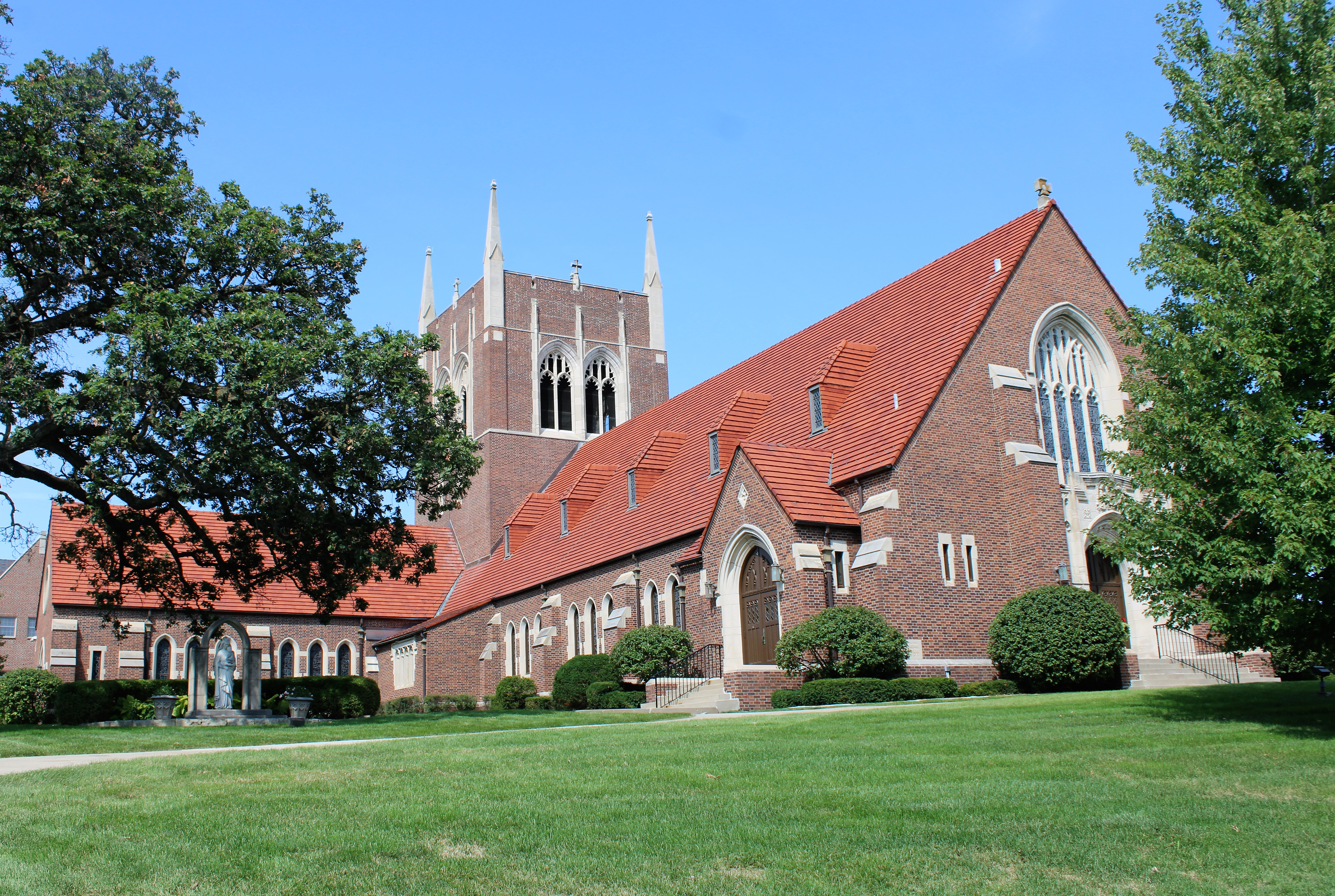
St. Augustin Catholic Church

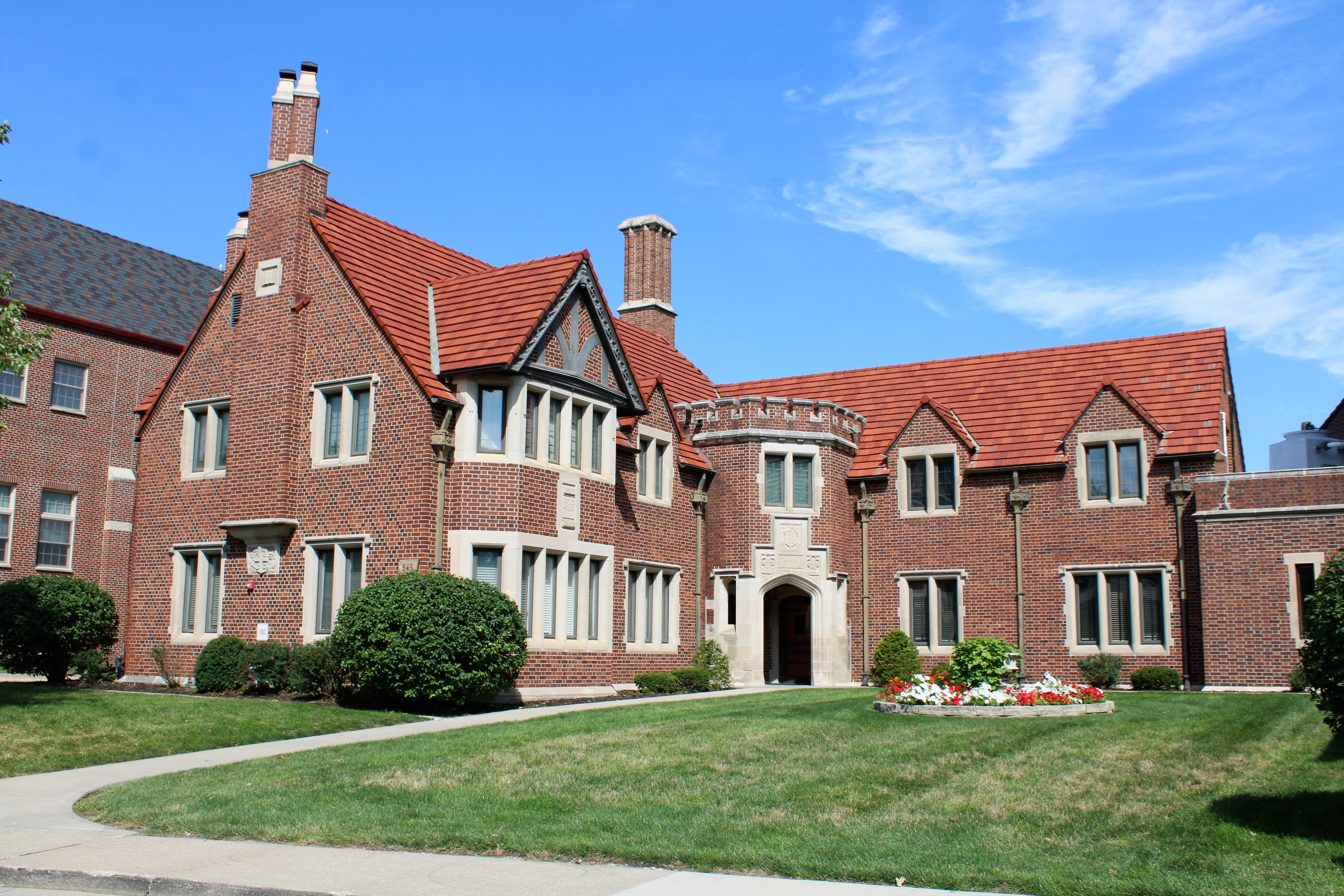
St. Augustin Catholic Church Rectory

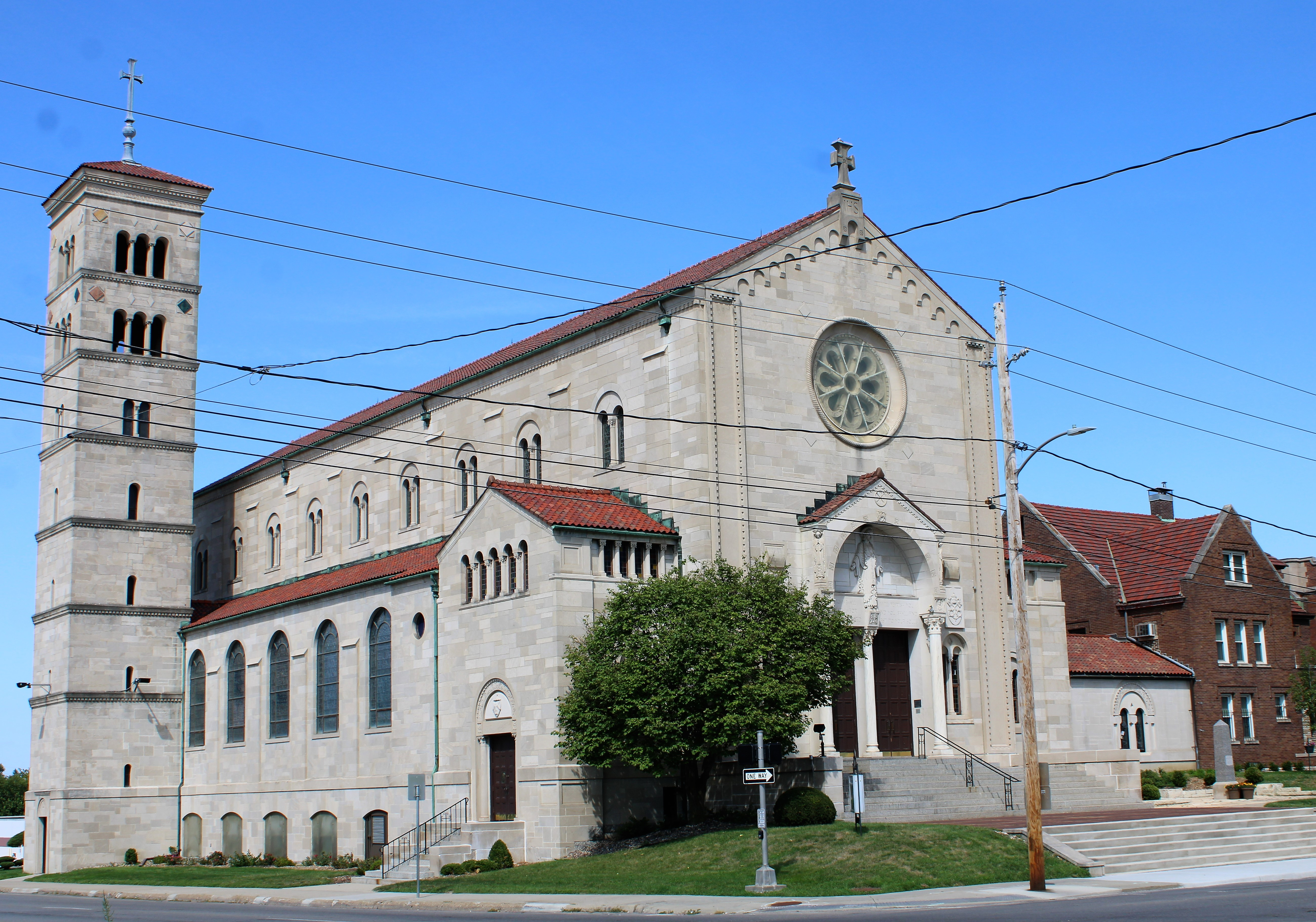
Basilica of St. John

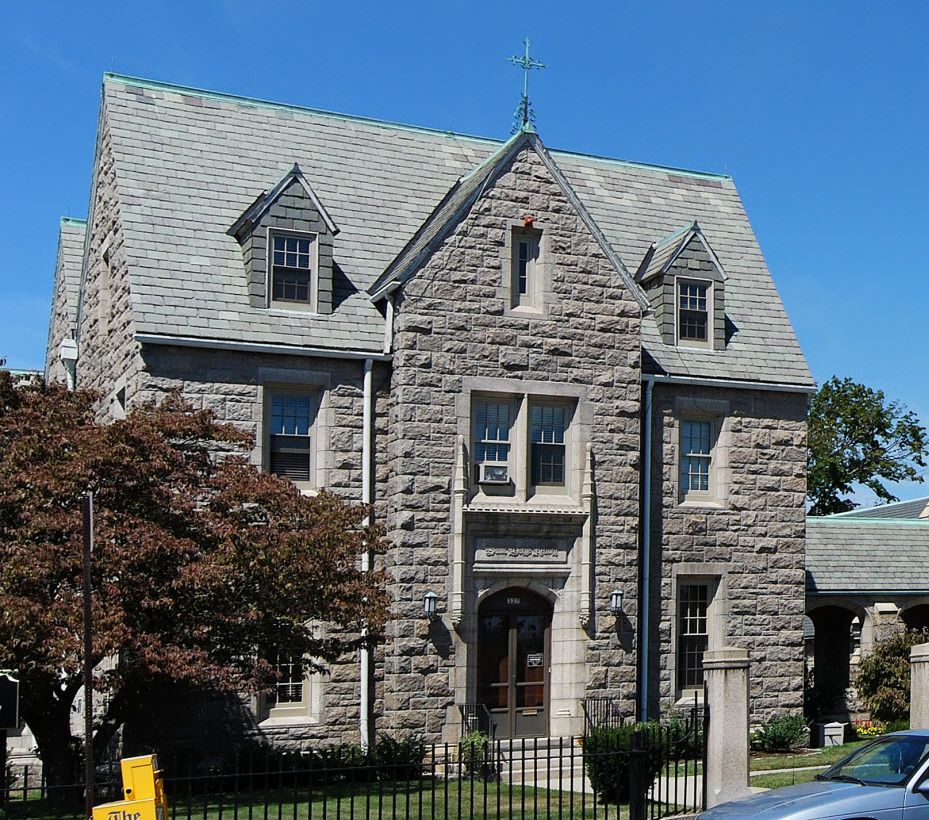
Cathedral of St. Mary of the Assumption Rectory

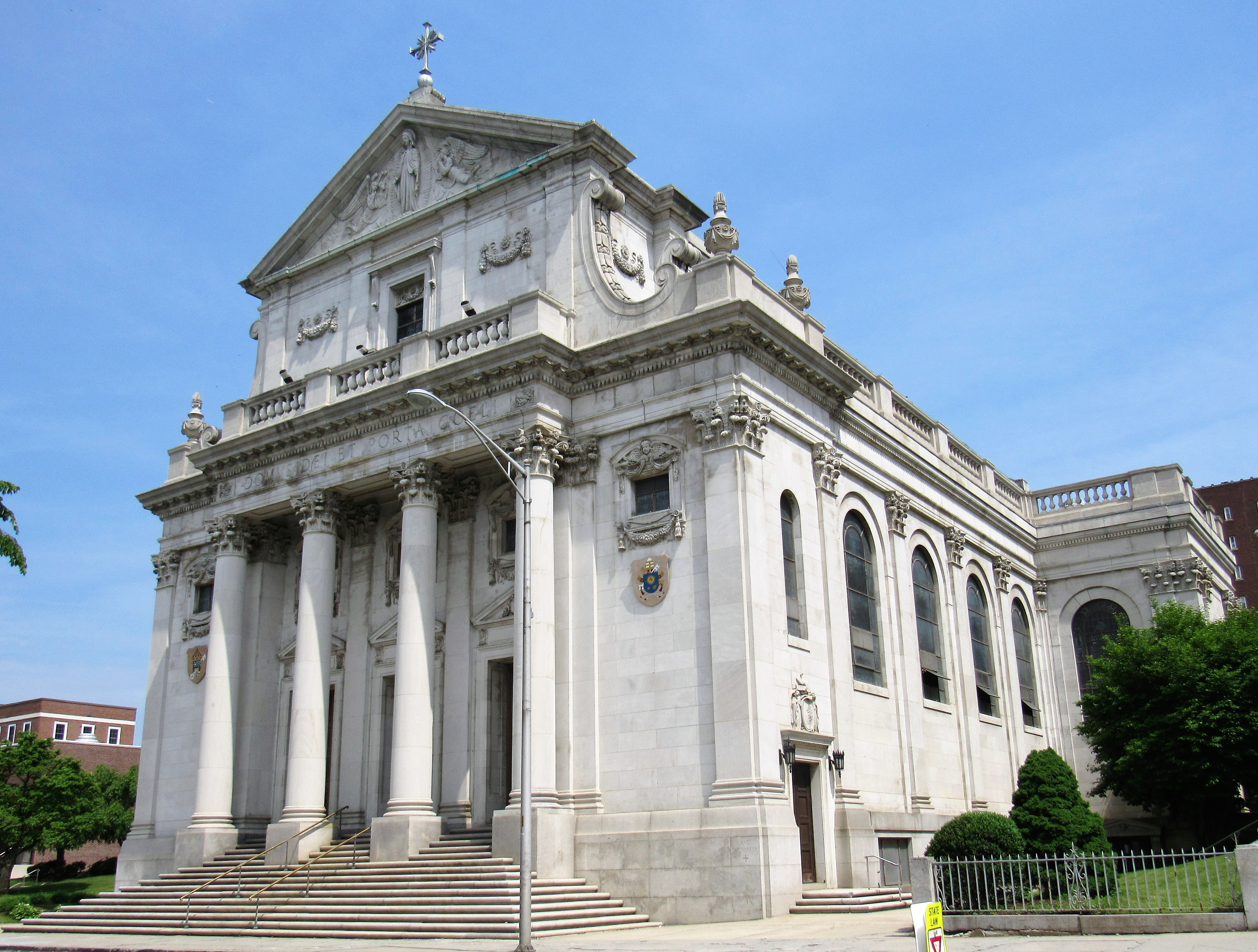
Basilica of the Immaculate Conception

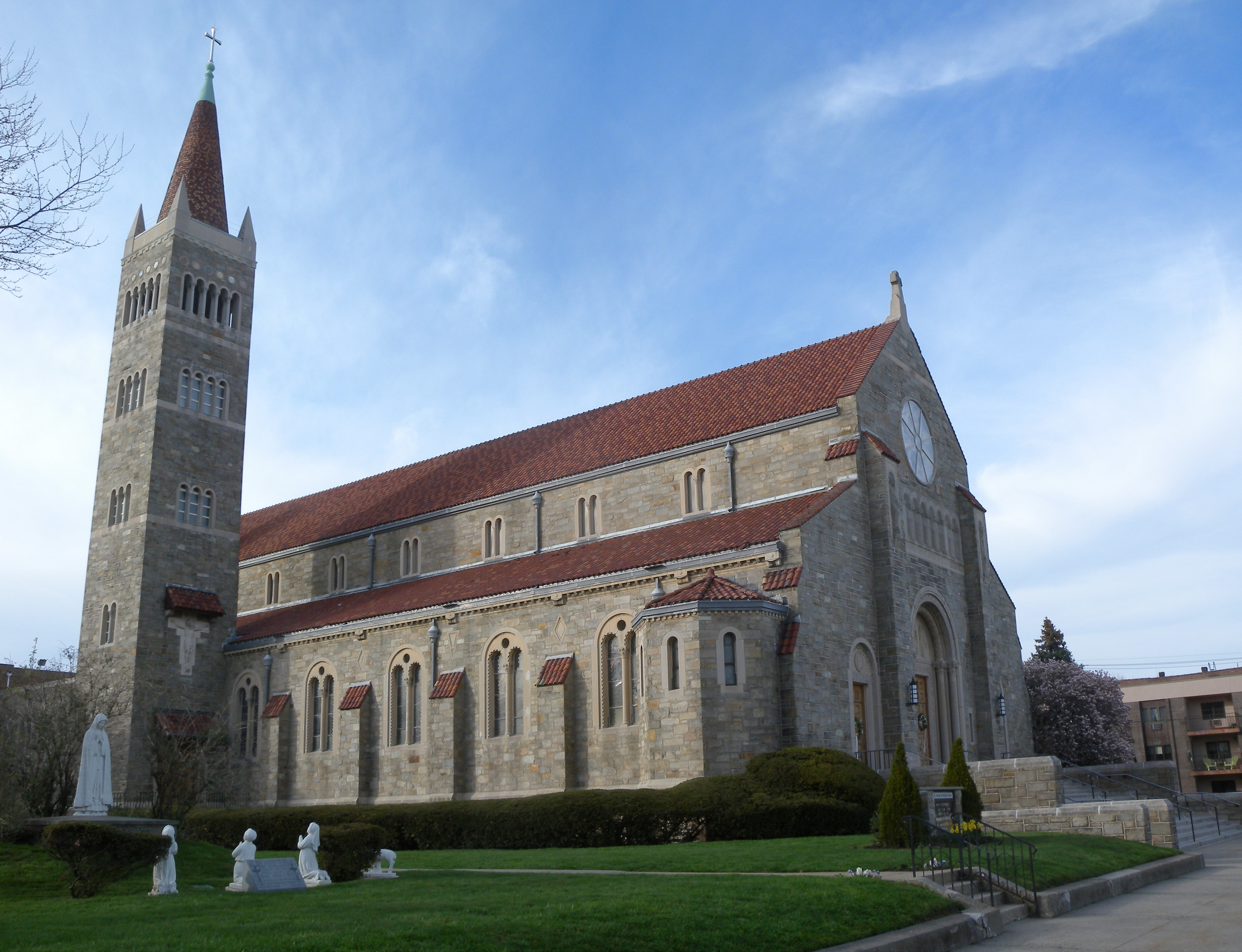
St. Vincent de Paul Catholic Church

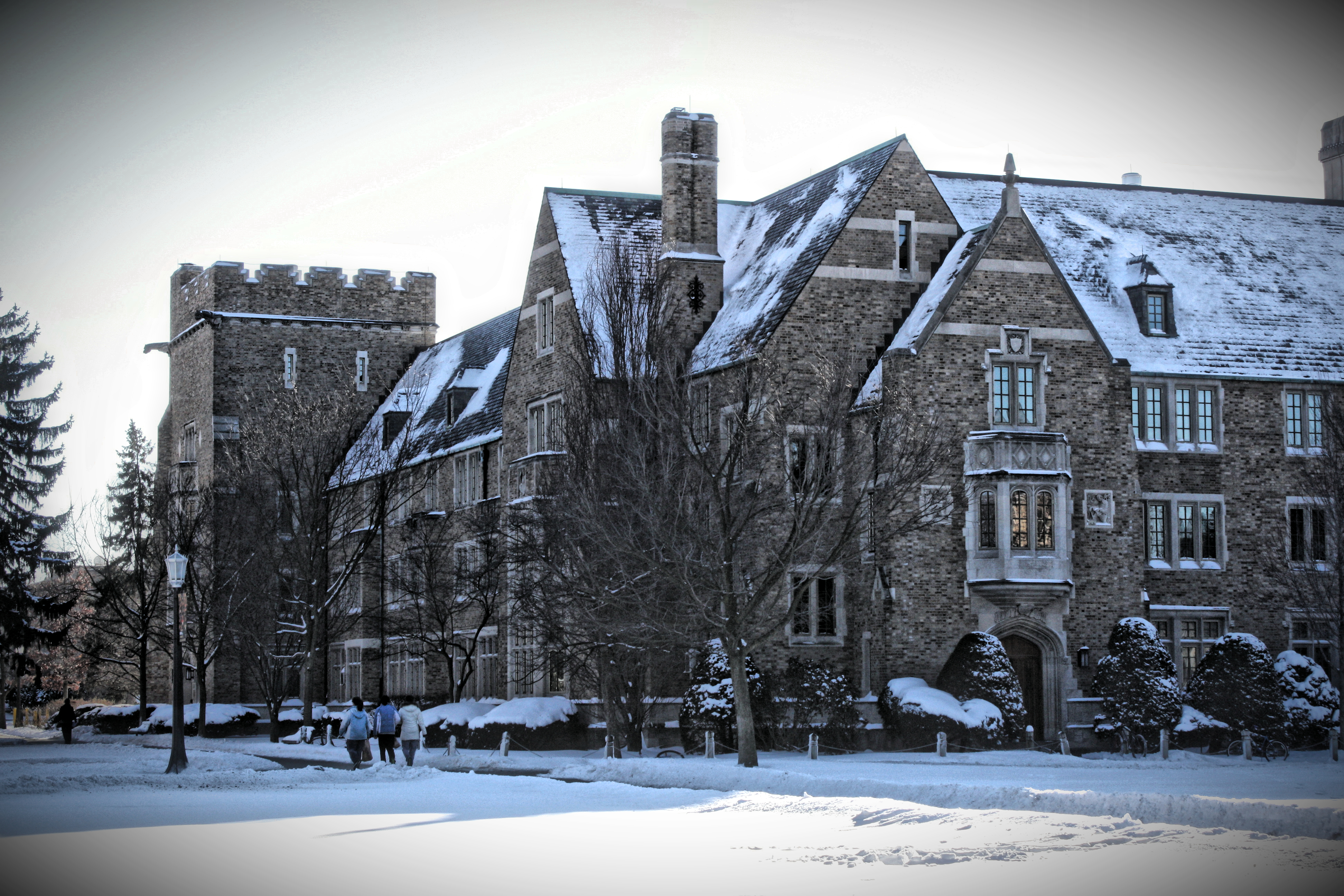
Alumni Hall

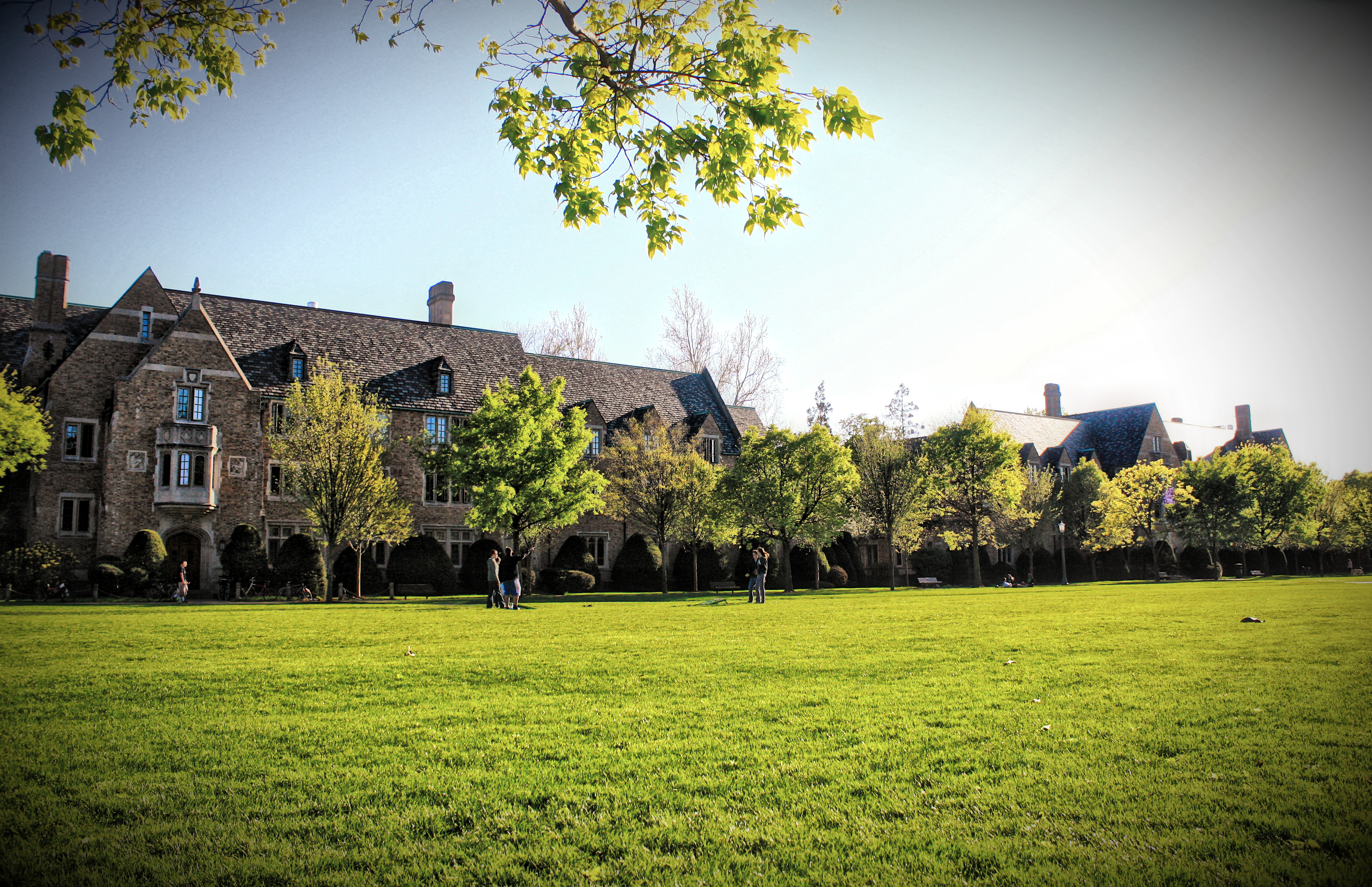
Dillon Hall

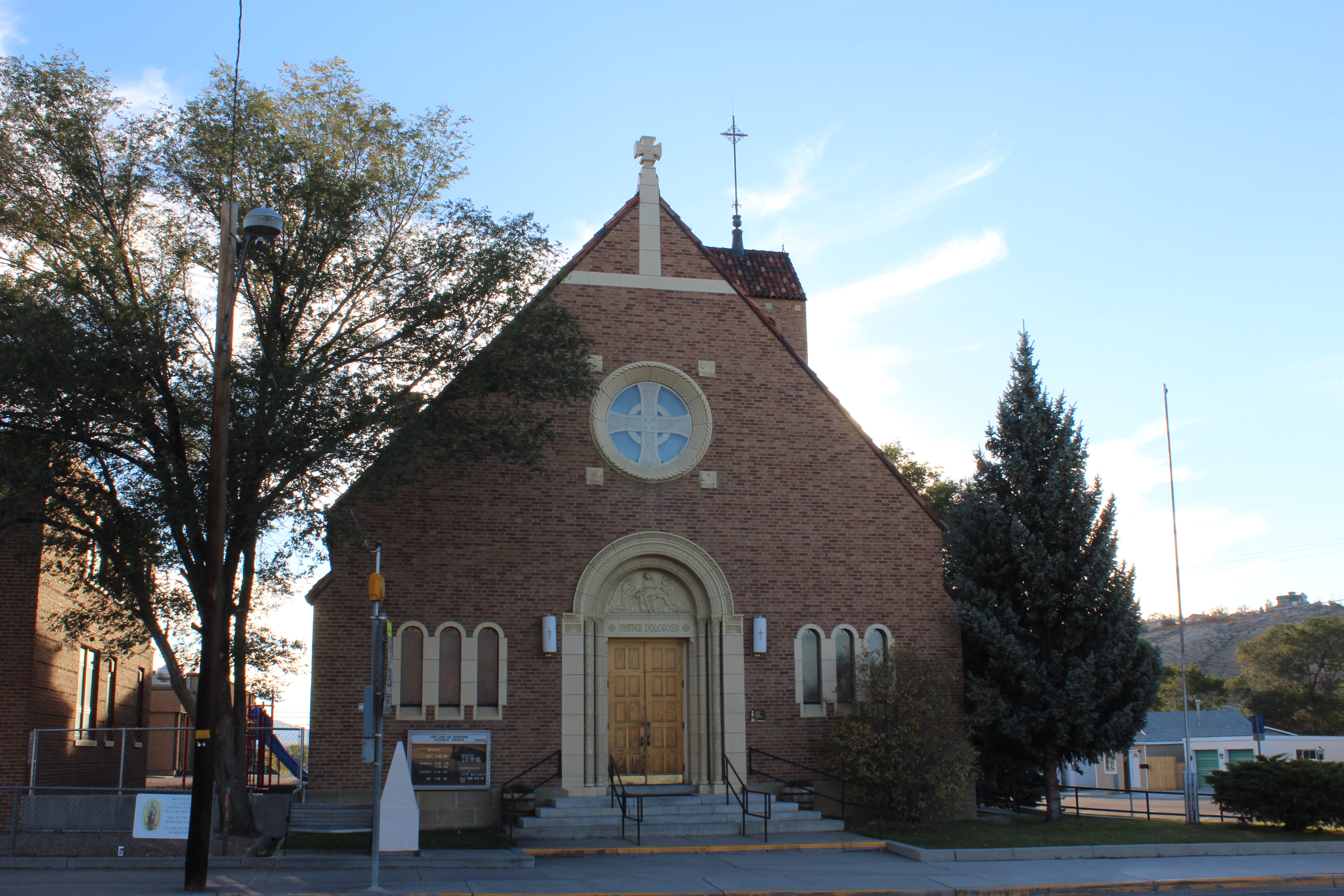
Our Lady of Sorrows Catholic Church

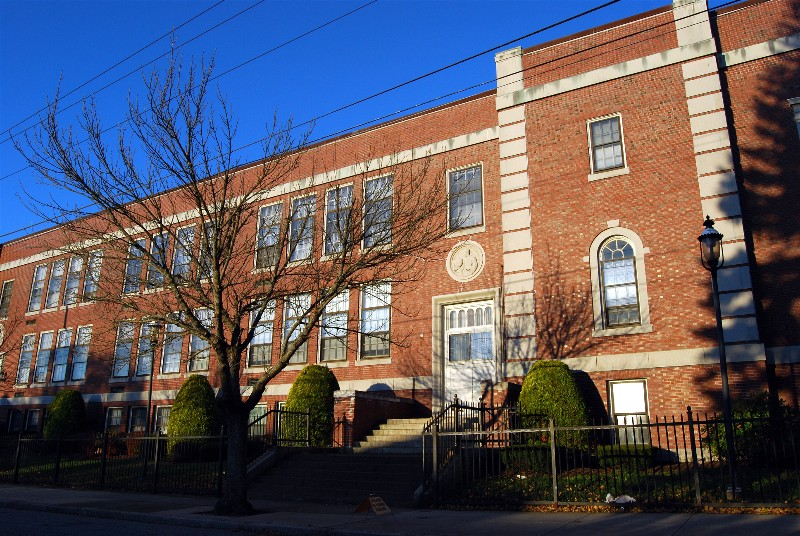
Sacred Heart School

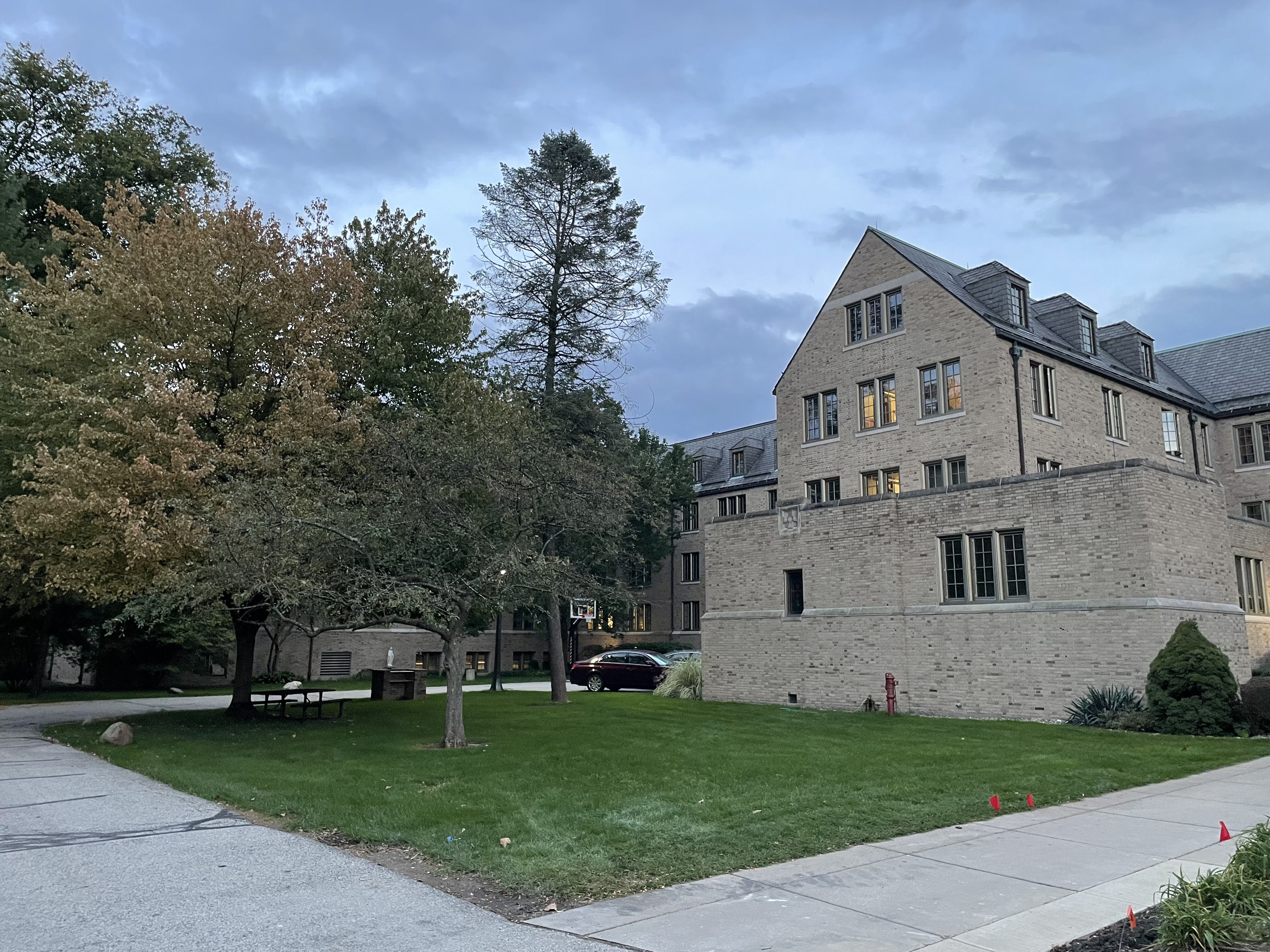
Zahm Hall

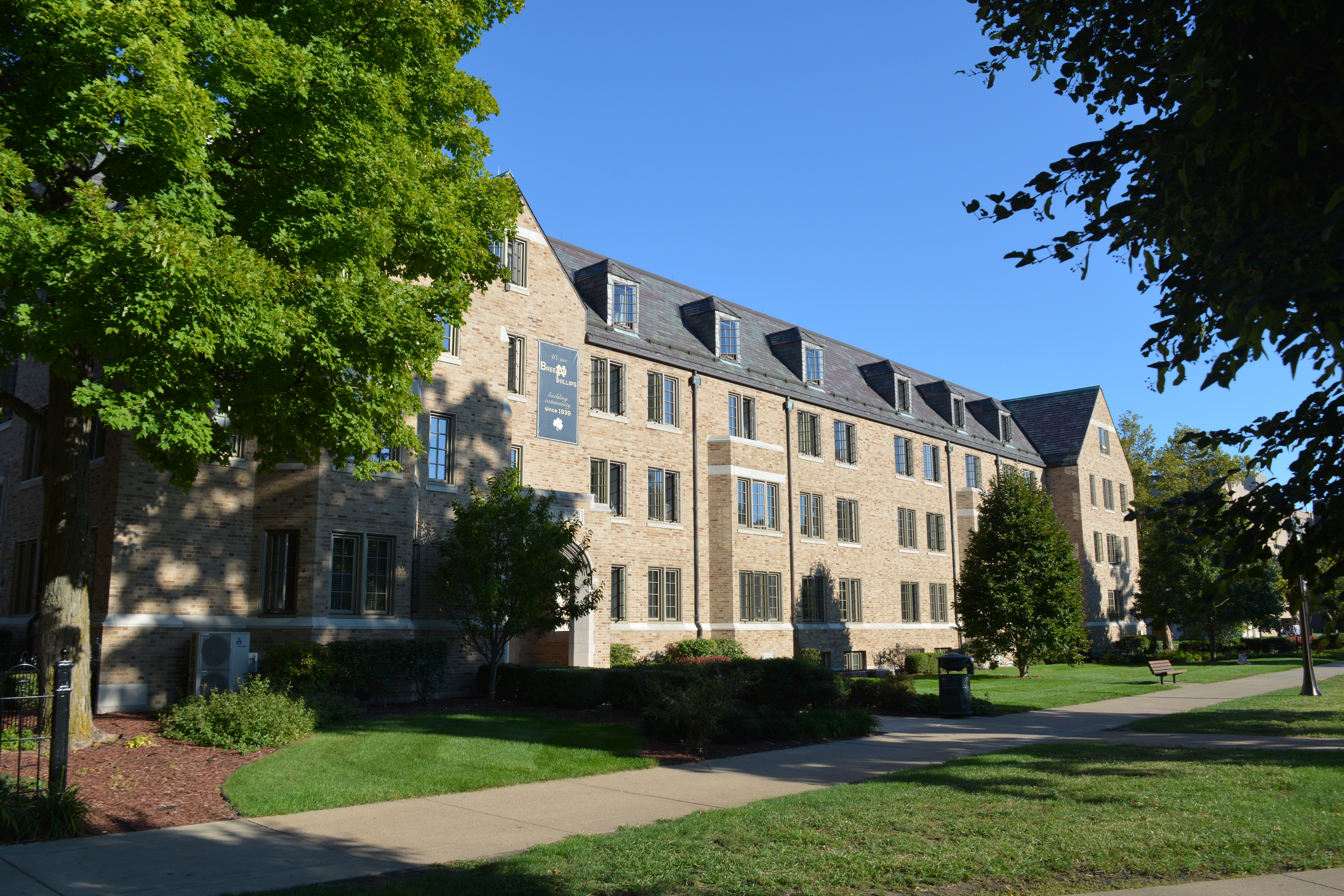
Breen-Phillips Hall

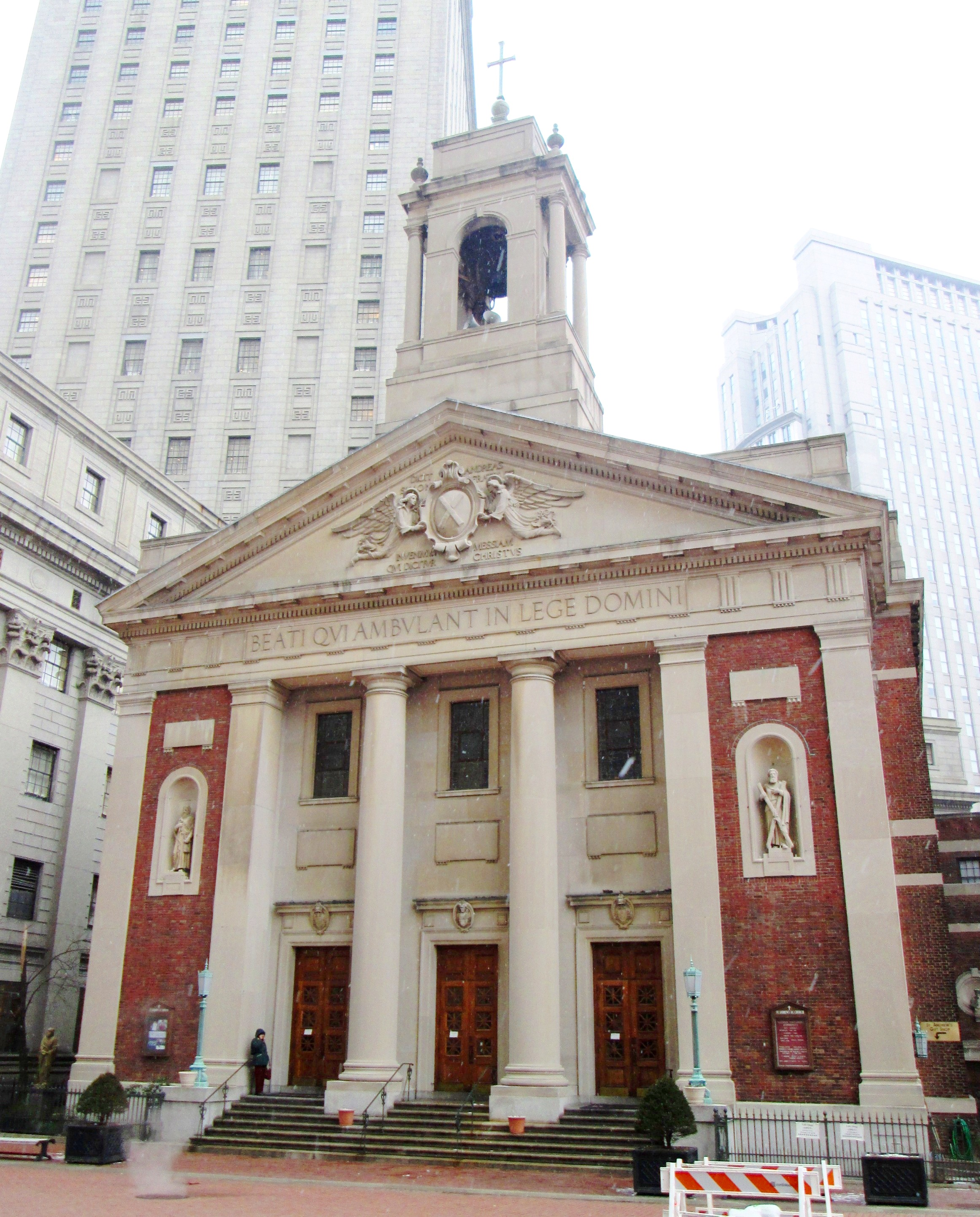
St. Andrew Church

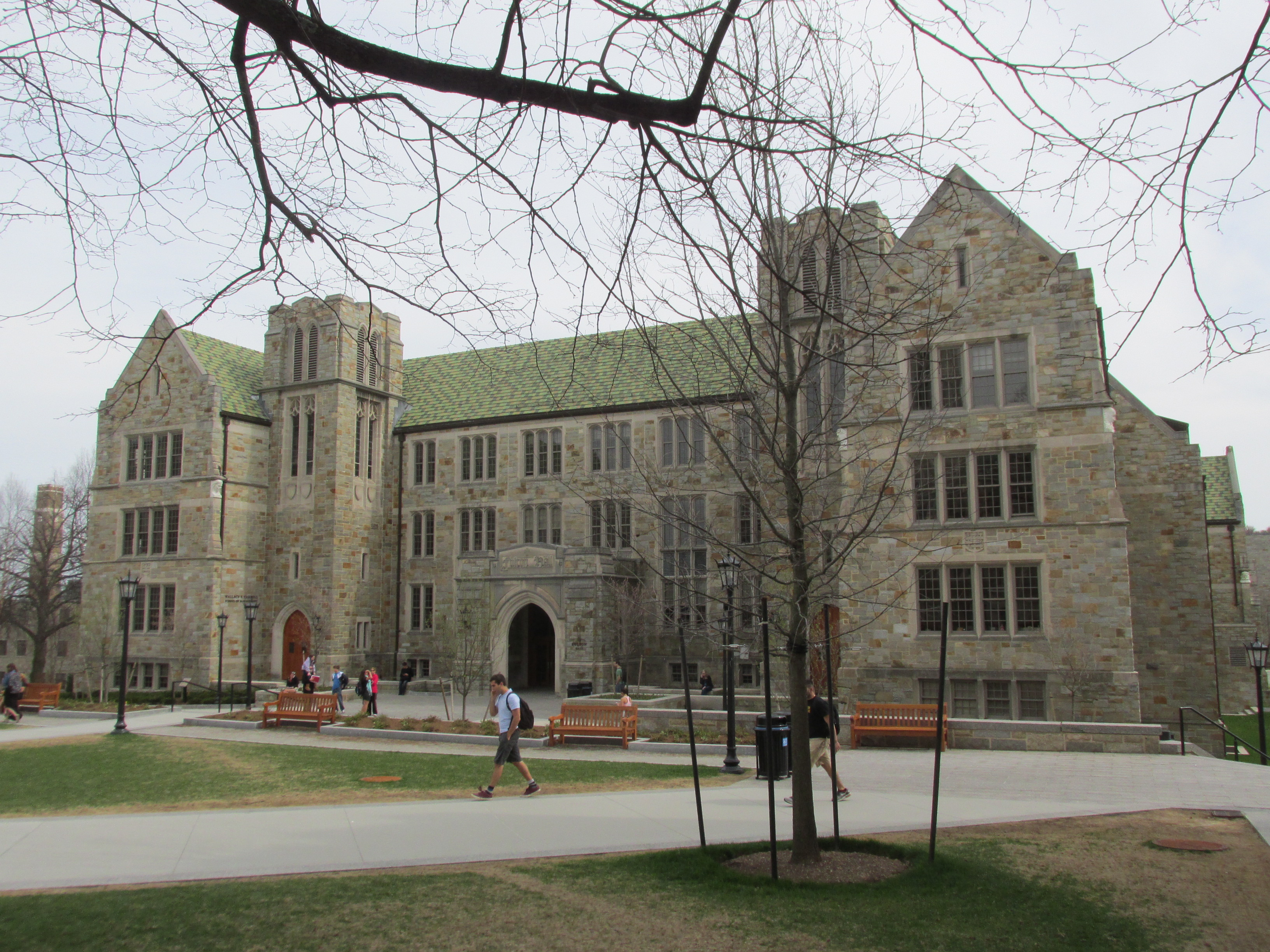
Fulton Hall

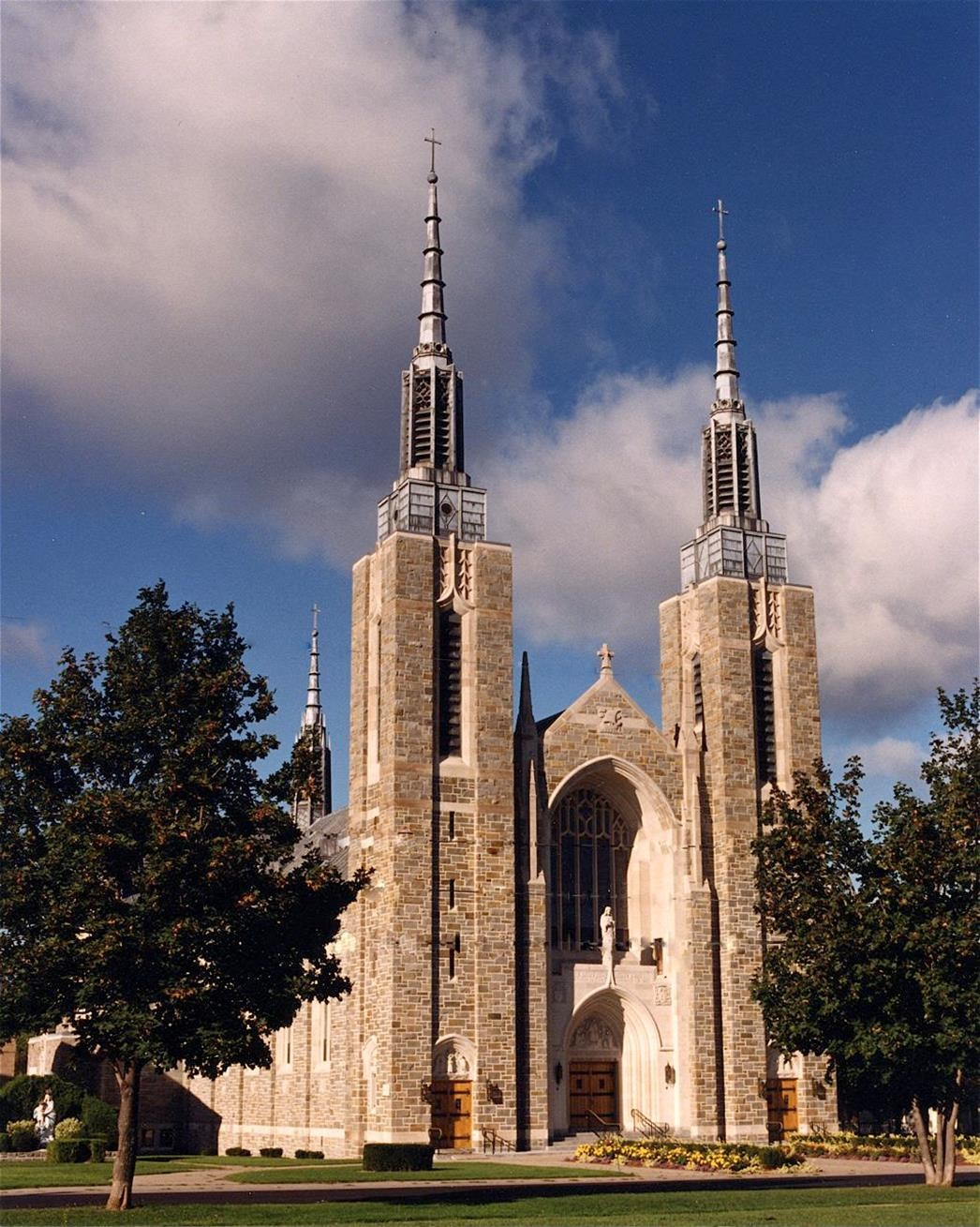
St. Mary's Cathedral

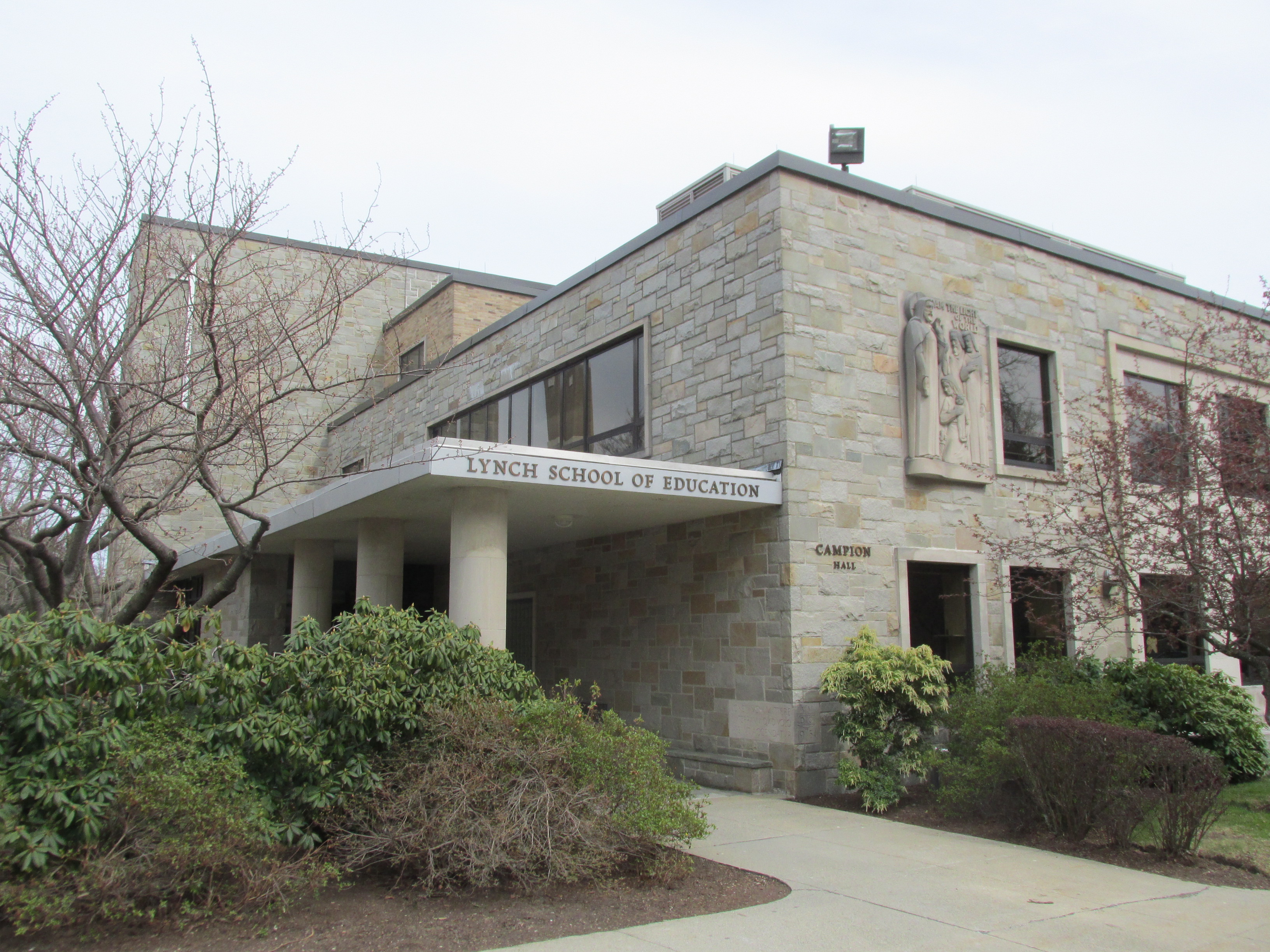
Campion Hall

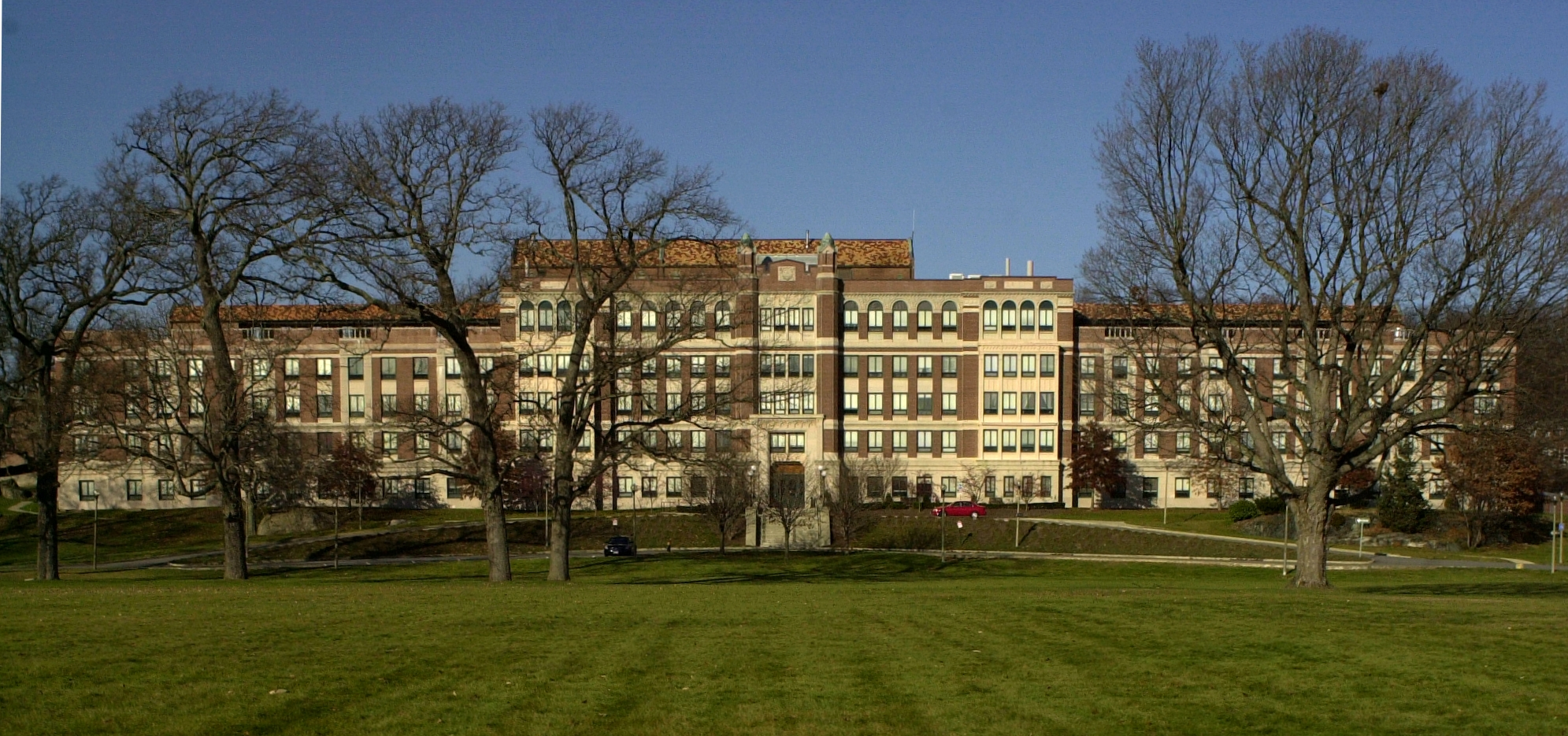
Boston Consumptives Hospital
