= Plymouth Place =

- U.S. National Register of Historic Places
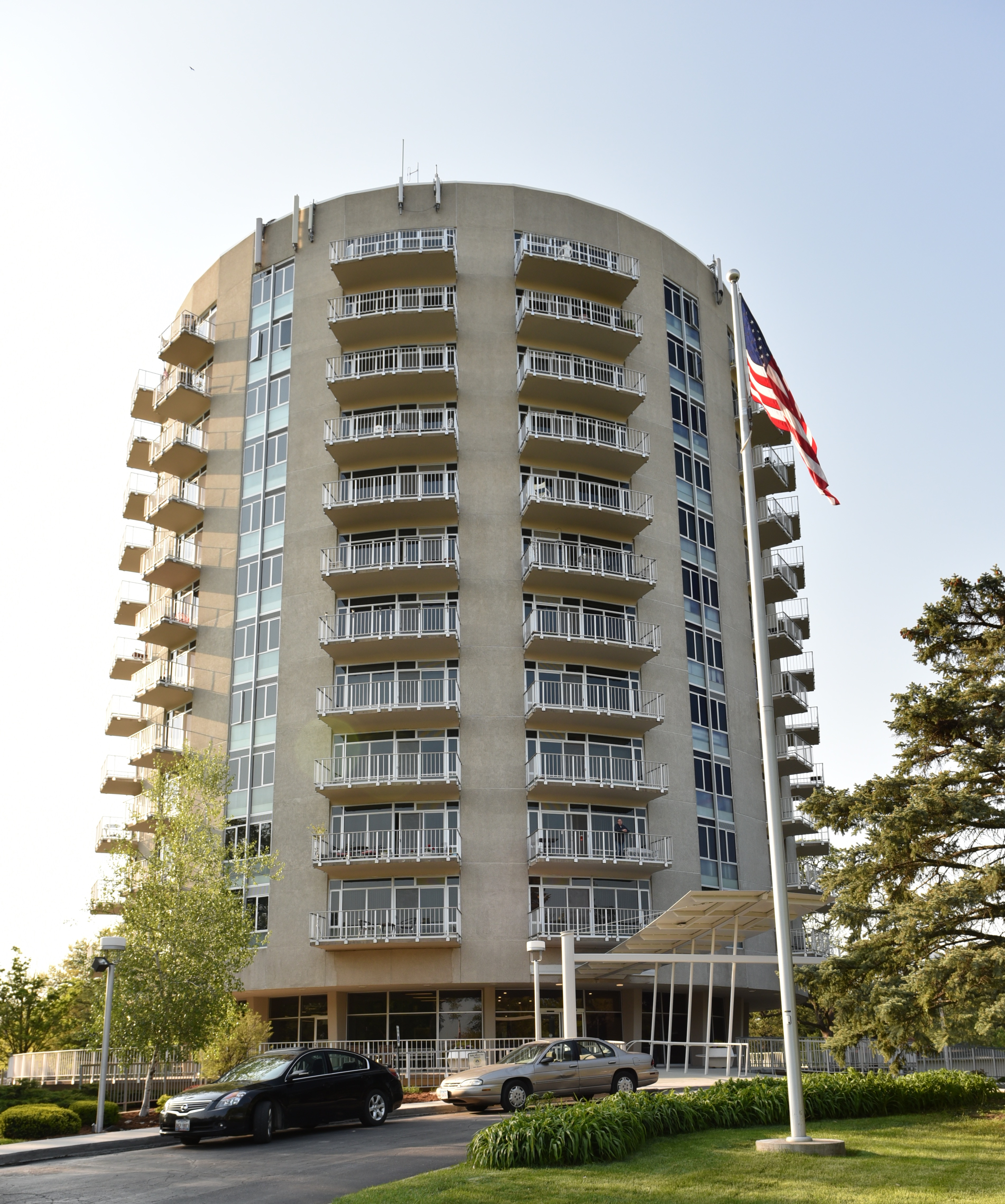

- Location within Iowa Location within the United States
- Location: 4111 Ingersoll Ave. Des Moines, Iowa
- Coordinates: 41°35′12.9″N 93°40′24.5″W
- Area: less than one acre
- Built: 1967-1968
- Architect: Raymond Hueholt
- Architectural style: Modernist
- NRHP reference No.: 15000140
- Added to NRHP: April 14, 2015

Plymouth Place is a historic building located in Des Moines, Iowa, United States. Construction of the building was initiated by Plymouth Congregational Church, which faces Plymouth Place on the opposite side of Ingersoll Avenue. Ground-breaking occurred on June 12, 1966. Completed in 1968, the 12-story structure rises to a height of 161.01 feet (49.08 m). This circular residential building was designed by local architect Raymond Hueholt. It has an unusual interior plan where a common central living room area is surrounded by peripheral living units. The building is also significant for providing quality affordable senior housing for low-income people regardless of religion or creed. At the time the Greenwood Park Plats Historic District was nominated for the National Register of Historic Places in 2013 it was considered a non-contributing property in the district, but it was considered significant on its own. The building was individually listed on the National Register of Historic Places in 2015.
