= Plymouth Church, Des Moines, Iowa =

Gothic Revival church in Des Moines, Iowa

- Plymouth United Church of Christ
- U.S. Historic district – Contributing property
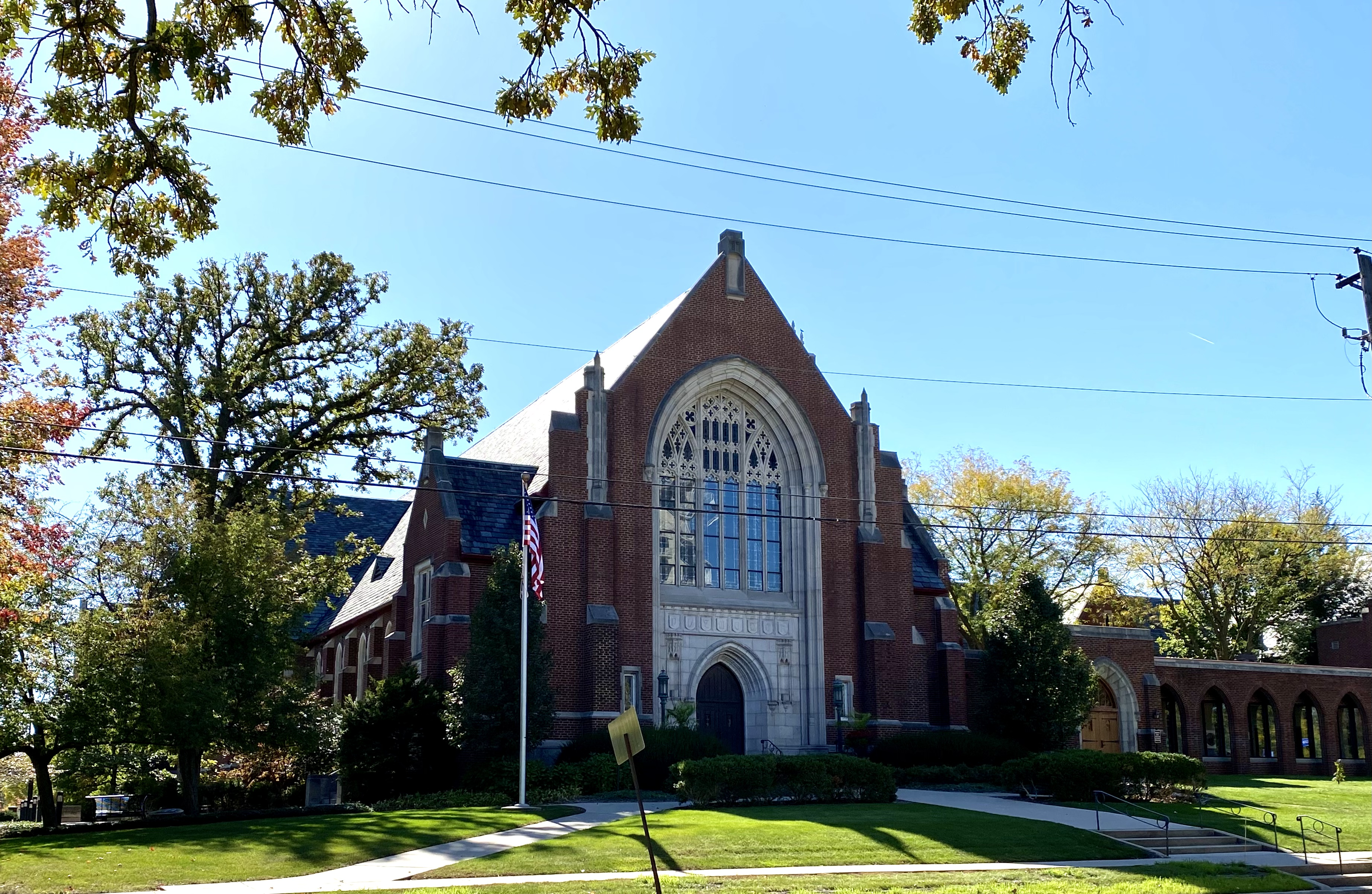
- Current Building at 42d and Ingersoll

- Location within Iowa Location within the United States
- Location: 545 42nd St. Des Moines, Iowa
- Coordinates: 41°35′06.6″N 93°40′25.2″W
- Built: 1927
- Architect: Proudfoot, Rawson and Souers
- Architectural style: Gothic Revival
- Part of: Greenwood Park Plats Historic District (ID13000068)
- Added to NRHP: April 24, 2013

Plymouth Church
- Plymouth United Church of Christ
- Plymouth Church
- Location: Des Moines, Iowa
- Country: USA
- Denomination: United Church of Christ
- Website: plymouthchurch.com

History
- Founded: 6 December 1857

Architecture
- Years built: 1858, 1876, 1927, 1978, 1986-88, 2003
- Construction cost: $477,000 (original)

Plymouth Church is an historic congregation located in Des Moines, Iowa and is a member of the United Church of Christ. Plymouth is known for its long history of social justice work including anti-racism and suffrage advocacy, ClimateCare, and aid to unhoused and refugee populations. Plymouth Church is an Open and Affirming church, a Stephen Ministries church, and a Just Peace Church. The church building, located at 42nd and Ingersoll Avenue, is included as a contributing property in the Greenwood Park Plats Historic District and listed on the National Register of Historic Places in 2013. The official name of the church is Plymouth Congregational Church of the United Church of Christ.

== History ==
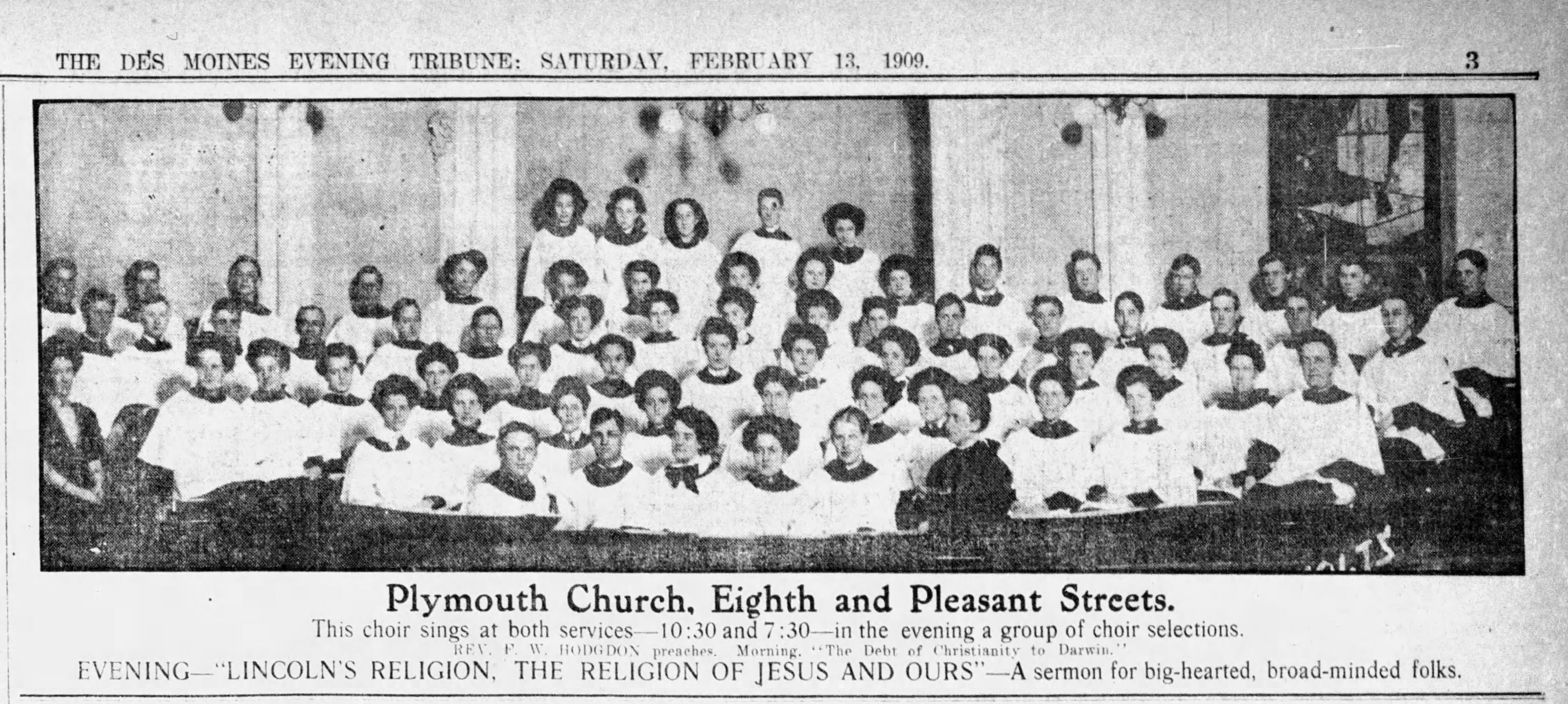
1909 Advertisement for Plymouth Sunday Service

Plymouth Church was formed in Des Moines on December 6, 1857. It was started by eleven men and women who signed the “Articles of Government and Faith of the Congregational Churches.” The first church building was a small frame building on Court Avenue. In 1864 the church had 66 members and moved to the northeast corner of Seventh and Locust Streets.

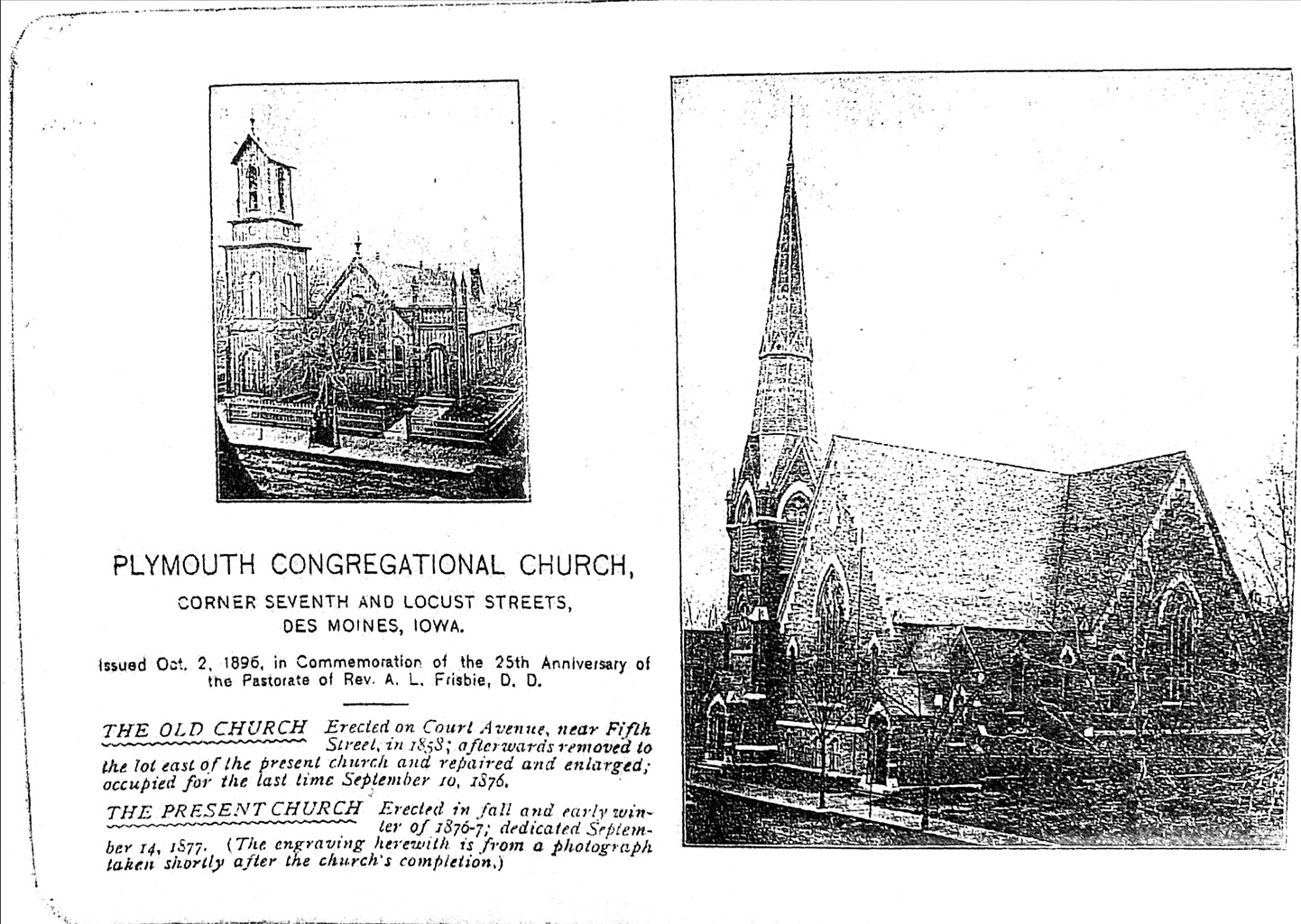
First Two Plymouth Buildings 1858 and 1876

Under the leadership of Reverend A.L. Frisbie, 1871–1899, a new church was built in 1877 at the Northeast corner of 7th and Locust, this was Plymouth's first real church. Pastor Frisbie and his wife Martha were both active in the anti-slavery and suffrage movements. During his service as pastor, three groups went into the Des Moines community to form new congregations: Pilgrim, North Park and Greenwood churches. In 1900 the church planned a new grand building at Eighth and Pleasant Streets downtown. The church was built on what came to be known as "Piety Hill." Parking became a problem at the downtown location as the church grew to 1300 members. Under pastor Frances VanHorn a new church was built at 8th and Pleasant Street. An advertisement from 1909 mentions a sermon entitled "Lincoln's Religion, the religion of Jesus and Ours - for big hearted, broad minded folk." During World War I a fourth neighborhood church, Waveland was started.

In 1919 there were three Congregational churches in Des Moines: Greenwood at 35th and Grand pastored by Rev. J. P. Burling; Plymouth at 8th and Pleasant pastored by J.E. Kirbye; and Waveland Park at 1117 42d Street pastored by H. J. Sealey. The current Plymouth Church building has three rooms honoring these early congregations: Waveland, Greenwood and Burling.

When Dr. Burtis MacHatton came to Plymouth, he found the 8th Street building to be “bursting at the seams.” In 1925 the city wished to extend Eighth Street through to Keosauqua Way and the church property was acquired by the city. The new building opened in 1927 with a similar gothic style and stained glass windows moved from the old church. The old church site is now part of the Principal building complex.

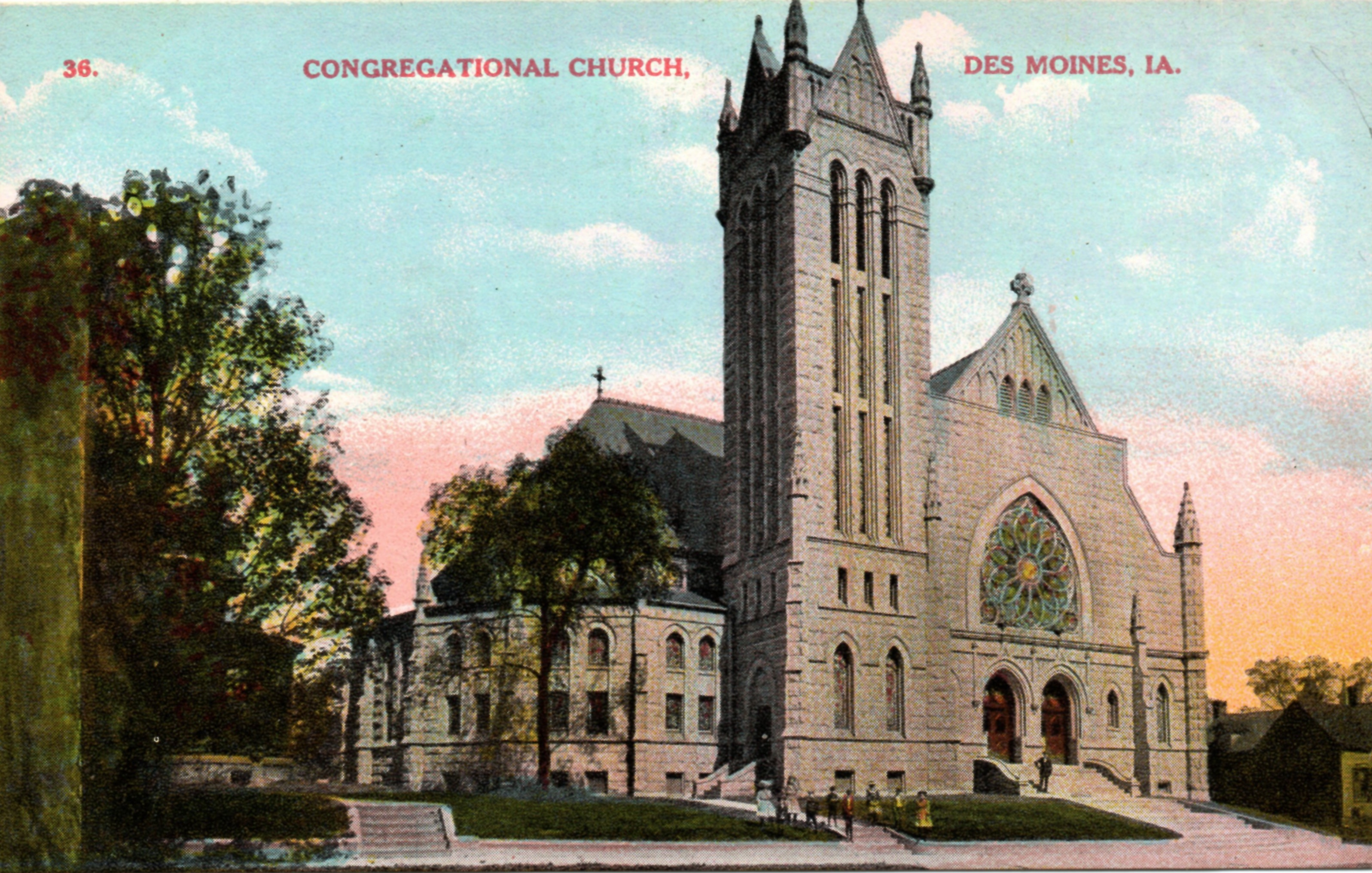
Plymouth Church, Des Moines Iowa Second Building

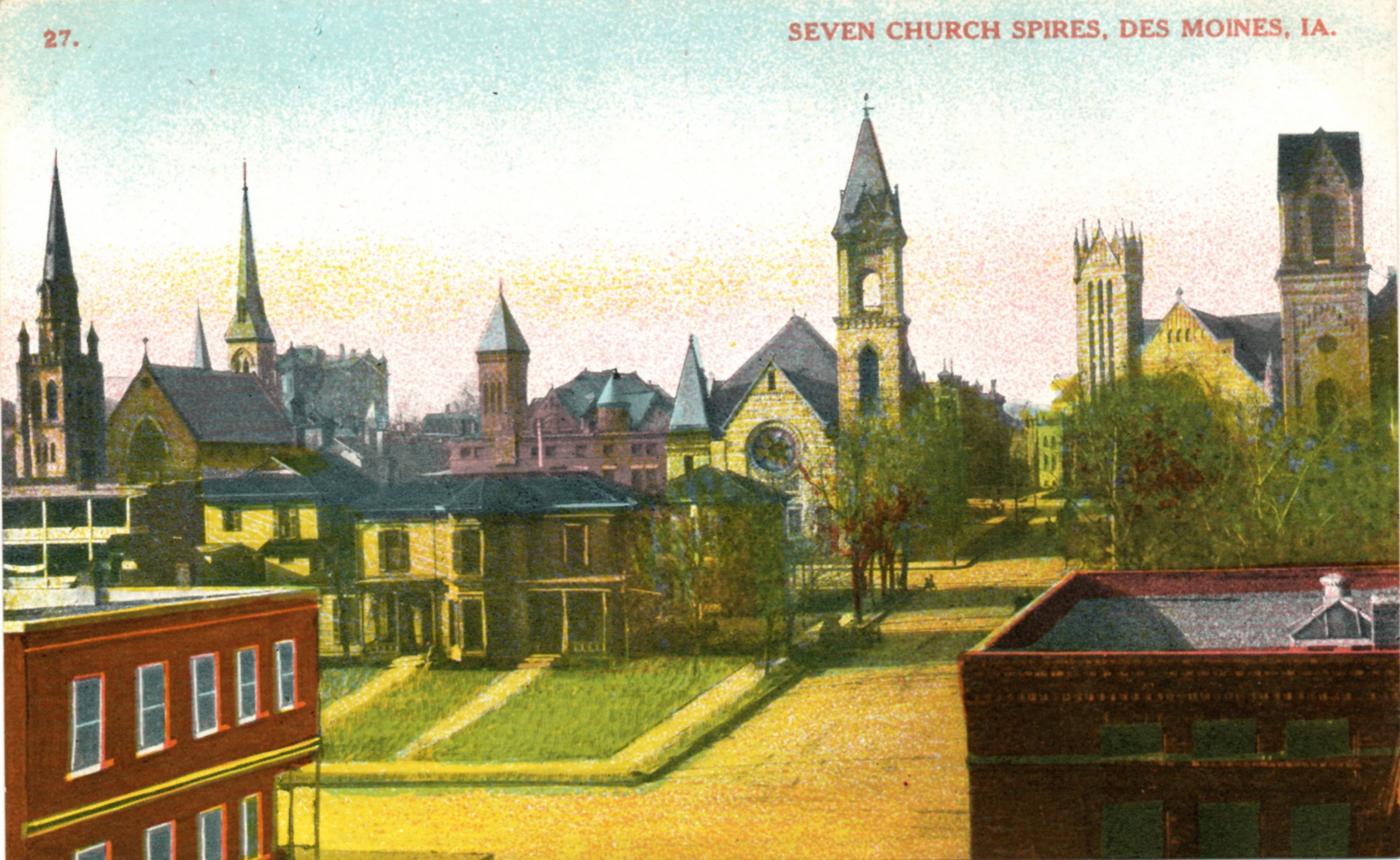
Seven Church Spires, Des Moines Iowa

The building committee decided to build a new church on the western outskirts of Des Moines at 41st and Ingersoll. The four neighborhood churches, North Park, Pilgrim, Greenwood and Waveland joined with Old Plymouth to build the new large church at a cost of $475,000. Since that time, the church has undergone two major expansions.

Stoddard Lane is remembered by the congregation as the Pastor who carried Plymouth through the depression and World War II. He promoted chose the Motto still used by the Plymouth congregation, “We agree to differ, resolve to love, unite to serve.”

In 1957 the Congregational Christian Churches and the Evangelical and Reformed Church merged to form the United Church of Christ. The congregation was affiliated with the new church at this time.

== Current building ==
The current Plymouth Church building is a contributing building in the Greenwood Park Plats Historic District. According to the application to the National Registry: "The Gothic Revival style is represented by the district's three churches as well as the West Chester Apartments (3831 Ingersoll Avenue, 1918). The most striking architectural feature of the district is the twin square English Gothic towers of Plymouth Congregational Church (4126 Ingersoll Avenue, 1926) and St. Augustin Catholic Church (545 42nd Street, 1922)."

Plymouth Church is sited: “This Gothic Revival plan has been somewhat compromised by a number of additions to the west and northwest. The notable feature is its prominent original square bell tower, a form that replicates that found in St. Agustin to the south. This is likely the only Des Moines example of matching church towers and the form itself seems to be unusual in the city. The original architects were Proudfoot, Rawson and Souers, aided by Dougher, Rich and Woodburn as associate designers. Construction was begun in May 1926. This church congregation combined two pre-existing congregations and represented the suburban shift of the downtown churches. Major additions date to 1978 was for $450,000 and 1986-88."

In 1961 a 4,500 pipe organ was installed. On October 16, 1988, a renovated building and grounds were dedicated after a 1.3 million dollar project. Education facilities were modernized, and mechanical systems were improved. Architects for the project were Woodburn and O'Neil for the sanctuary work and Stouffer and Smith for the education and general work.

== Henry Martyn Rollins Tower ==
The square English Gothic tower of the Plymouth Church building was built as a memorial to Henry Martyn Rollins. Rollins was a Des Moines business man and civic leader (1841-1915). Rollins was an active member of Plymouth Church and served as chair of the board of trustees for many years. The tower is a key architectural element of the church. As the church building has grown, the tower has become a central focal point of the building. The tower is 82 feet tall and constructed of brick and limestone. Extensive repairs were made to the tower in 2019–20.

== Social action ==
Plymouth Church has always been a leader in social action in the Des Moines Community. In 1883 it founded and supported the Sunbeam Rescue Mission. In 1912 it opened its doors to families without fuel during a cold winter. In 1968 the church opened a retirement home for low income seniors, Plymouth Place, located across the street from the church. In 1998, 250 members of the congregation worked to build a three bedroom Habitat for Humanity home in two weeks after raising the funds for materials. In 2003 the church initiated a LGBQ friendly policy. In 2018 the church began to display a “Black Lives Matter” banner.

== Abolitionists ==
One cherished story in Plymouth history is that the first location of Plymouth Church in downtown Des Moines served as a stop on the Underground Railroad. The first church building was a small frame building on Court Avenue. "While at this location, the church was used by the underground railroad, hiding slaves on their journey north."[6]

It is unlikely that the church served as a physical railroad stop because the Underground Railroad conductors tried to avoid densely populated areas and there is no contemporaneous documentation that Plymouth Church was a stop. Certainly, however, the membership of early Plymouth held abolitionist sentiments:

“June 1851: General Association of Congregational Churches Affirms Being Guided by Higher Law Than Man-made Law Toward Slavery Meeting in Denmark, Iowa, members declare that a higher law than man-made law should guide their acts and that members do nothing to aid in apprehending fugitive slaves.”

The Underground Railroad route through Des Moines started at Jordan House (West Des Moines, Iowa) The wagons drove along the south bank of the Raccoon river toward the confluence of the Raccoon and Des Moines Rivers. They passed near downtown Des Moines to cross the Des Moines river by ferry or bridge to reach the capitol grounds on the east side of the river. The railroad trail would have passed near the downtown location of Plymouth Church in order to cross the Des Moines river on the way to the next overnight stopping point near Yellow Banks Park. The trail through Iowa continued east to Illinois and eventually the fugitives made their way to Canada.

One prominent Plymouth founding member who was voted in as a trustee on January 18, 1858 (Minutes, Plymouth Congregational Church, 1858) was John Teesdale, editor of the Des Moines Newspaper: The Des Moines Citizen, renamed the Iowa State Register in January 1860. John Brown and Teesdale attended the same Congregational Church in Akron, Ohio. Teesdale was an abolitionist and friend of John Brown (abolitionist). On one of Brown’s trips through Iowa in 1859, Teesdale met Brown at the Des Moines river and paid the ferry fare for his party to cross.

In 1882, Teesdale provided a detailed account of his last encounter with Brown in a letter to the editor in the Des Moines Iowa State Register:

[Brown] sent me word that he had camped out near Mr. Jordan's west of Des Moines, and would be through the city at a stated hour. He would see me at the bridge on Court Avenue, but desired to avoid observation as much as possible for fear his train should be intercepted. He stopped his train near the bridge. None of the slaves were in sight, the covers of the wagons being closed. He said to me that that was probably his last trip. He was on his way to Virginia, where he meant to begin a conflict for freedom that would fire the whole country. I deprecated the struggle as madness that would probably cost him his life without benefiting the poor blacks. His soul was on fire. He seemed to be imbued with a conviction that the hour, big with the fate of the country, was about to strike, and there could be no failure.

— John Teesdale, Letter to the editor, "Old John Brown: Mr. Teesdale Supplements Our Last Sunday Story of the Old Hero's Visit to Des Moines - Smuggling a Load of Slaves Through this City." Des Moines Iowa State Register, April 2, 1882

Teesdale reported that he paid the wagons’ toll to cross the river.

== Sunbeam Rescue Mission ==
The Mission was founded and supported by Mrs. A. Y. Rawson's (Mary Louise Scott Rawson 1839-1900) Plymouth Church Sunday School Class from 1893 to 1906. The mission was run single-handedly by Frank and Grace Cramer and was one of the first charitable missions in Des Moines. The mission was a multi-purpose social agency providing housing for homeless men, unwed mothers and babies. Its mission included job training, reclamation of prostitutes and religious services. The mission was a business enterprise that included a restaurant, laundry, a free medical clinic, and a kindling factory.

Frank and Grace Cramer worked for eleven years without a vacation working seven days a week from 5 AM to 10:30 PM. Finally, after 14 years, Grace lost 38pounds and was advised to move to a more temperate climate. The board was unable to find a replacement for her and the mission was closed. During those years the mission provided 39,502 nights for men, 31, 162 nights for women and 147,328 meals.

A newspaper article entitled "Cry for Justice" was published with the closing of the mission. "Here and there women will be saved who have seen nothing ahead but blight, darkness and death. But no permanent and lasting reform will ever be accomplished until society demands one code of morals for both sexes...then we can hope to restrict, nay even eradicate the social evil."

== Senior Pastors ==
- J.T. Cook, 1857-1858
- J.M. Chamberlain, 1858-1865
- Henry S. DeForest, 1866-1870
- A.L. Frisbie, 1871-1899
- Francis J. Van Horn, 1899-1903
- Frank W. Hodgdon, 1903-1910
- J. Edward Kirbye, 1911-1921
- Burtis R. MacHatton, 1921-1929
- Stoddard Lane, 1929-1943
- Frederick M. Meek, 1943-1946
- Fred Hoskins, 1946-1950
- Charles M. Houser, 1950-1959
- James W. Lenhart, 1960-1977
- Ford Forsythe (Interim), 1977-1978
- James O. Gilliom, 1978-1994
- David R. Ruhe, 1994-2015
- Mathew Mardis-LeCroy 2015-2020
- Sarai Rice (Interim) 2020-2021
- Jared Wortman 2021-
