= Charitable Irish Society of Boston =

Charitable organization

The Charitable Irish Society of Boston was founded in 1737 and is the oldest Irish organization in North America. Its early charitable efforts focused around providing temporary loans and assistance in finding work to Irish immigrants.

The society was incorporated in 1809 and established a constitution in 1810.

== Involvement in the first St. Patrick's Day ==
The society organized the first observance of St. Patrick's Day in the Thirteen Colonies.

Surprisingly, the celebration was not Catholic in nature, Irish immigration to the colonies having been dominated by Protestants. The society's purpose in gathering was simply to honour its homeland, and although they continued to meet annually to coordinate charitable works for the Irish community in Boston, they did not meet on 17 March again until 1794. During the observance of the day, individuals attended a service of worship and a special dinner. The list of members names are available here Despite being protestant a large amount have Irish surnames.

== Notable members ==
- Patrick A. Collins
- James Michael Curley
- Patrick Donohoe
- John F. Fitzgerald
- Hugh O'Brien
- Robert Keating O'Neill
- John C. Park
- Timothy Francis Walsh

== See also ==
- Charitable Irish Society of Halifax
