= Greenwood Park Plats Historic District =

Historic district in Iowa, United States

- U.S. National Register of Historic Places
- U.S. Historic district
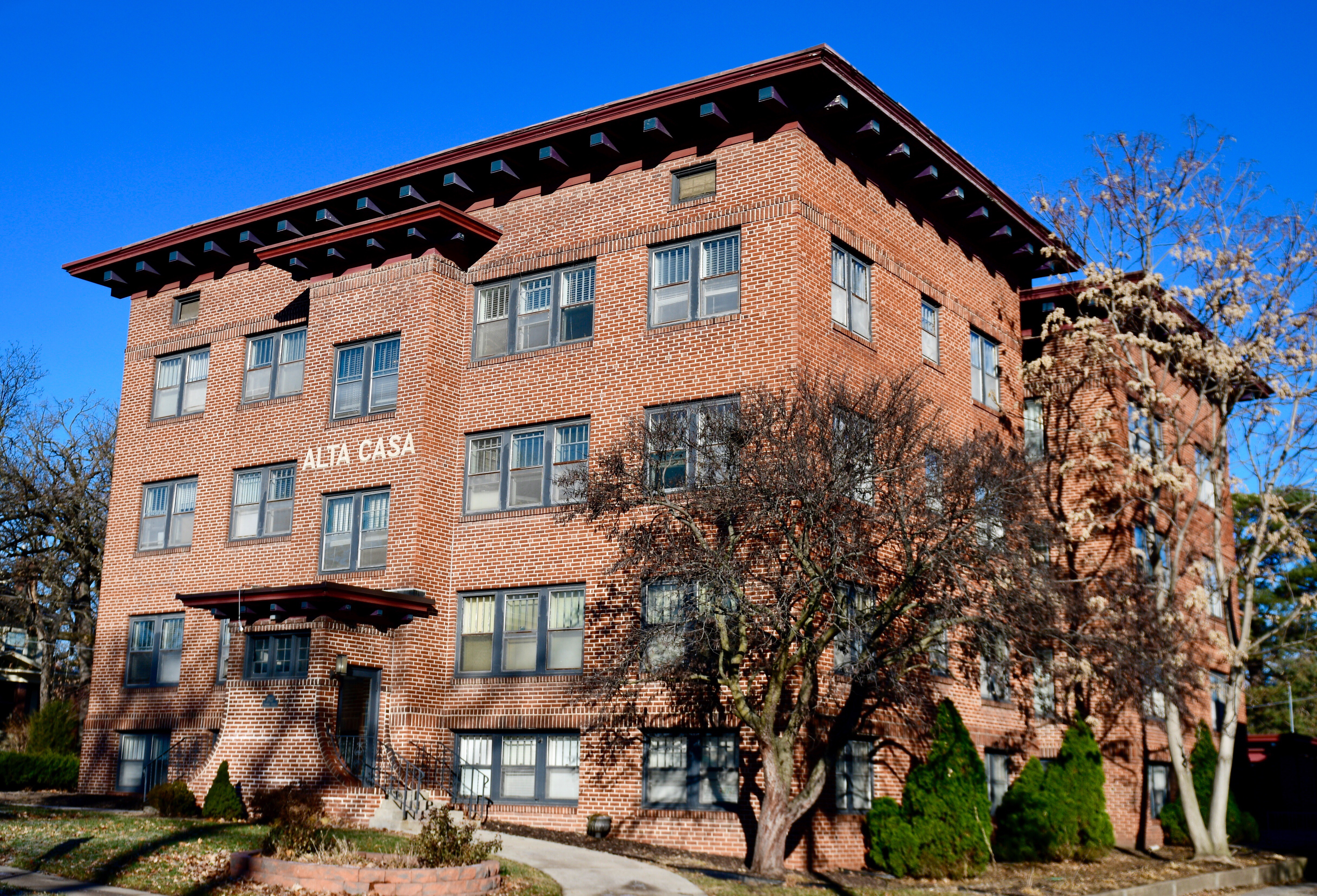
- Alta Casa (1920)

- Location within Iowa Location within the United States
- Location: Roughly 39th to 42nd Sts., approx. Grand Ave. to Center & Pleasant Sts., 4006, 4024 Grand Ave., Des Moines, Iowa
- Coordinates: 41°35′17″N 93°40′18″W
- Area: 82.12 acres (33.23 ha)
- Built by: Jim Cook; John Henry McKlveen
- Architectural style: Late 19th and 20th Century Revivals; Late 19th and Early 20th Century American Movements
- NRHP reference No.: 13000068
- Added to NRHP: April 24, 2013

The Greenwood Park Plats Historic District is a nationally recognized historic district located in Des Moines, Iowa, United States. It was listed on the National Register of Historic Places in 2013. At the time of its nomination the district consisted of 393 resources, including 277 contributing buildings, one contributing site, 109 non-contributing buildings, and six non-contributing structures. Most of this district was originally known as Brown's Park, a private park that was the location of the Iowa State Fair from 1879 to 1885. Founded privately in 1854, the fair was held in several locations in the state making it more of a regional event. It was also not profitable. That changed when the fair moved to this location, and its profitability eventually led to funding from the Iowa General Assembly and a permanent location on the east side of the city. Brown's Park continued for a while longer and the streetcar line from Des Moines opened in 1889.

The historic district is the northwest section of a former suburb known as Greenwood Park. It was incorporated as a city in the area of Brown's Park in 1881, and in 1890 it was annexed into the city of Des Moines. The Greenwood Park Association bought Brown's Park 1892. While it was platted for residential development, housing was not built here until 1910 and into the 1920s. For the most part, it continued to be used as a park until then. The part of the district north of Ingersoll Avenue is exclusively residential. Apartment buildings were built in the Greenwood Park Plat from 1918 to 1926, and five of them remain. Three churches were built in the district between 1922 and 1938. They include St. Augustine Catholic Church (1922), Plymouth Congregational Church (1926; now United Church of Christ), and Central Presbyterian Church (1938). Four medical buildings and an office building were built along 39th Street and on Ingersoll Avenue between 1955 and 1961. Prior to this, there was virtually no commercial development in Greenwood Park. Five more were completed between 1963 and 1975.
