= St. Augustin Catholic Church (Des Moines, Iowa) =

- St. Augustin Roman Catholic Church
- U.S. Historic district – Contributing property
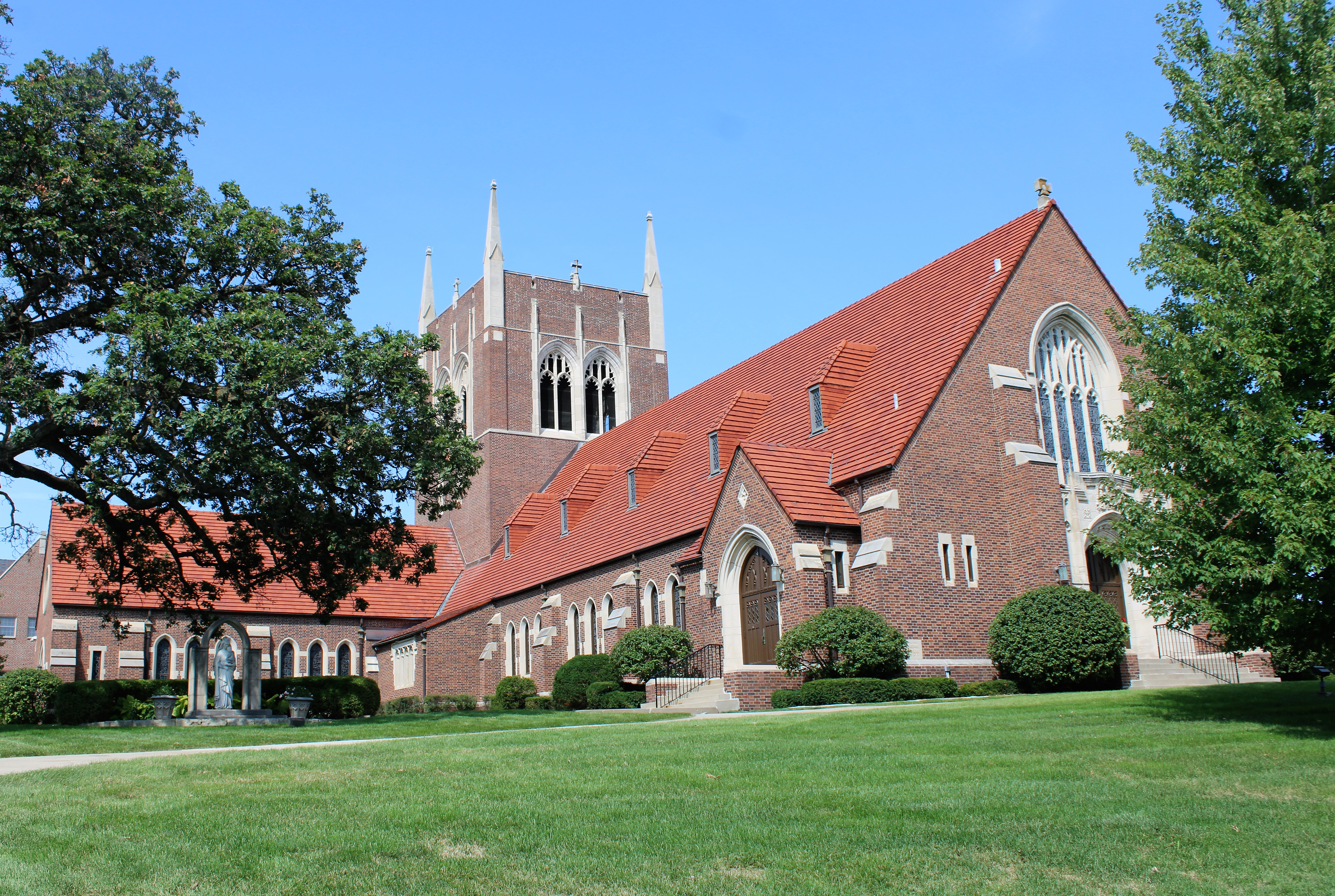
- St. Augustin's Church in 2022

- Location within Iowa Location within the United States
- Location: 545 42nd St. Des Moines, Iowa
- Coordinates: 41°35′06.6″N 93°40′25.2″W
- Built: 1922-1924
- Architect: Maginnis & Walsh
- Architectural style: Gothic Revival
- Part of: Greenwood Park Plats Historic District (ID13000068)
- Added to NRHP: April 24, 2013

St. Augustin Catholic Church is a Catholic parish in the Diocese of Des Moines located on the west side of Des Moines, Iowa, United States. It was included as a contributing property in the Greenwood Park Plats Historic District and listed on the National Register of Historic Places in 2013.

== History ==
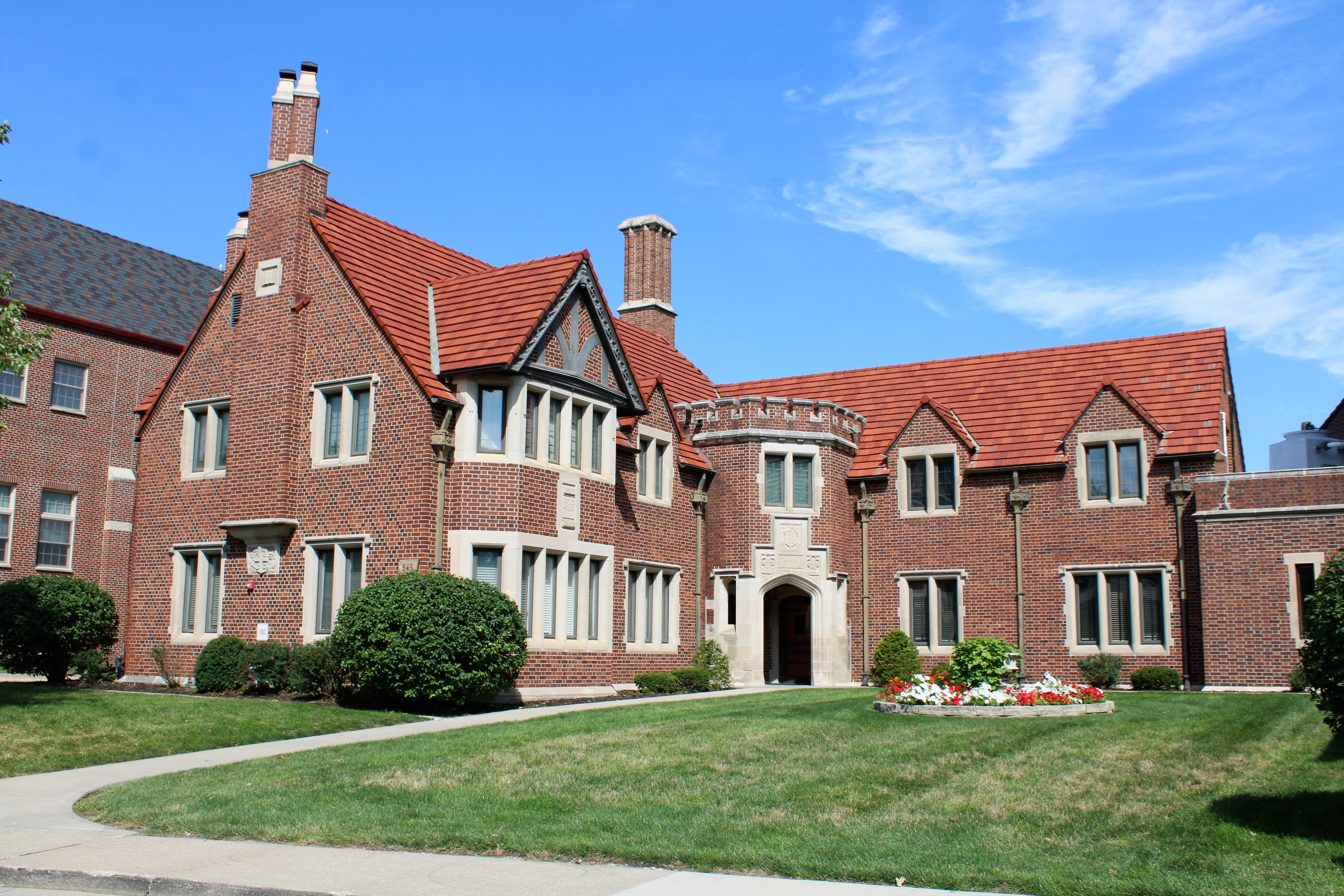
Rectory

The parish began when 12 parishioners from St. Ambrose Cathedral petitioned Bishop Thomas Drumm for a new west side parish in 1920. He assigned the Rev. John Noonan as the founding pastor, and a part of the former Iowa State Fairgrounds property on Grand Avenue was acquired for $20,000. The prominent Boston architectural firm Maginnis & Walsh, who were known for their ecclesiastical work, designed the new parish church. It was built for about for $100,000, and it was dedicated on February 3, 1924. The stained glass windows were added in 1935. The parish paid off its debt of $293,000 and it was consecrated by Bishop Gerald Bergan in 1947.

A parish school was established and a seven-room school building was completed further to the west on Grand Avenue in 1926. The school was staffed by the Adrian Dominican Sisters. The rectory was added to the church in 1928. A new school building was completed during the pastorate of Msgr. Gerald Walker (1948-1981). The parking lot was enlarged in 1951 when the city discontinued street parking, and a residence at 4111 Grand Avenue was removed around this time. The church complex was enlarged in 1985, 1989, and in 1998. The parking lot and the school building were expanded during the pastorate of Msgr. Frank Bognanno (1990-2000).

== Architecture ==
The church is English Gothic in style, and it is dominated by a large square tower located at the crossing. The tower is similar in design to the Plymouth United Church of Christ immediately to the north. The church complex is a brick structure with Bedford stone trim, and a red flat-tile roof. The stained glass windows are the work of Charles Jay Connick of Boston.

== School ==
The parish hosts the K-8 school St. Augustin School, which first opened in 1926.
