= Sacred Heart School (Fall River, Massachusetts) =

- U.S. National Register of Historic Places
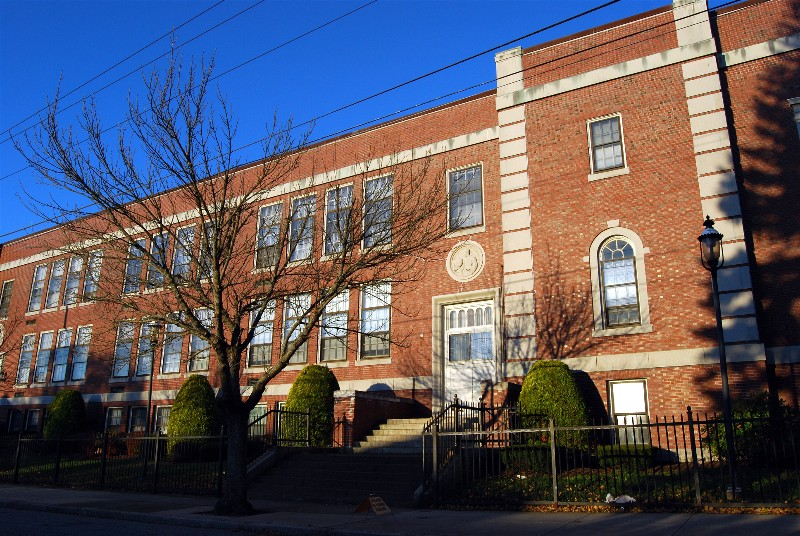

- Location within Massachusetts Location within the United States
- Location: 90 Linden Street, Fall River, Massachusetts
- Coordinates: 41°42′11″N 71°8′57″W
- Built: 1931
- Architect: Maginnis and Walsh
- Architectural style: Colonial Revival, Moderne
- MPS: Fall River MRA
- NRHP reference No.: 87000371
- Added to NRHP: March 9, 1987

The Sacred Heart School is a historic former school building in Fall River, Massachusetts. It is a large two-story brick Georgian Revival building, with stone beltcourses above and below the main floors. The Pine Street facade has a slightly bowed entrance pavilion with three entrances, each set in a round arch. The building was designed by the Boston firm of Maginnis and Walsh, known for its ecclesiastical designs.

The school building was constructed in 1931-32 as the second home for the Catholic school which was founded in 1887. The school was closed in 1982 and the school building was sold to a private developer for housing. The building added to the National Register of Historic Places in 1987.

== See also ==
- National Register of Historic Places listings in Fall River, Massachusetts
