= Maginnis & Walsh =

American architecture firm

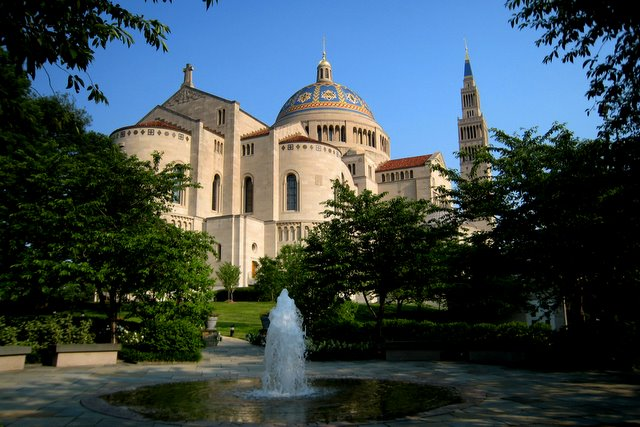
Basilica of the National Shrine of the Immaculate Conception in Washington, D.C.

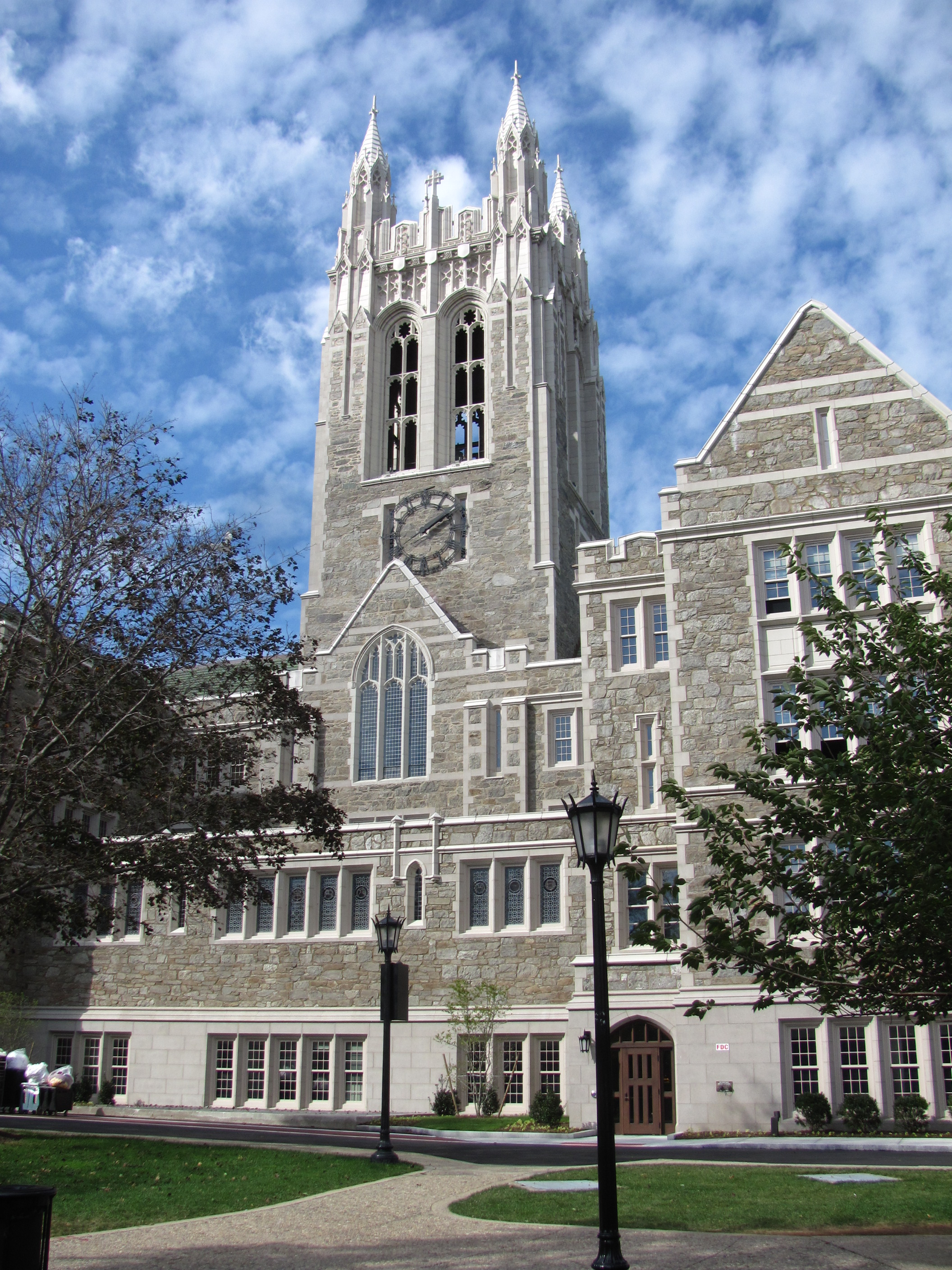
Gasson Hall at Boston College in 1908

Bronze doors to St. Patrick's Cathedral in Midtown Manhattan in 1949

Maginnis & Walsh was a Boston-based architecture firm started by Charles Donagh Maginnis and Timothy Francis Walsh in 1905. It was known for its innovative design of churches in Boston in the first half of the 20th century.

== Partners ==
Maginnis was born January 7, 1867, in Derry, Ireland. He emigrated to Boston at age 18 and got his first job apprenticing for architect Edmund M. Wheelwright as a draftsman. Influenced by the work of modern architect Ralph Adams Cram, Maginnis became a distinguished Gothic architect and an articulate writer and orator on the role of architecture in society. In 1948, Maginnis received the AIA Gold Medal for "outstanding service to American architecture," the highest award in the profession. He died in 1955 at the age of 88 in Brookline, Massachusetts.

Timothy Francis Walsh was born in 1868 in Cambridge, Massachusetts. He attended The English High School in Boston, and worked as a draftsman for Peabody and Stearns from 1887 to 1893, when he left to study in Europe. Walsh returned to Boston in 1895 and went into business as Walsh & Kearns. He worked as a solo practitioner in 1896 and 1897, and 1898 went into partnership with Charles Donagh Maginnis and Matthew Sullivan. He died on July 7, 1934, at the age of 66 in North Scituate, Massachusetts.

Matthew Sullivan was born in Boston and trained in the office of Edmund M. Wheelwright, Boston City Architect (1891-1894). Sullivan succeeded Wheelwright as City Architect and served in that position from 1895 to 1901, when he became a junior partner in the firm of Maginnis, Walsh and Sullivan, which was widely known for its ecclesiastical work. He withdrew from that partnership to carry on work independently in 1906.

Between the firm's founding in 1898 and the death of Timothy Walsh in 1934, the firm is credited with over 115 ecclesiastical works. The Maginnis and Walsh collection at the Boston Public Library contains work of the architectural firm from 1913 to 1952.

Eugene F. Kennedy Jr. was born in Brooklyn, New York City, on January 31, 1904, to Eugene F. Kennedy Sr. and Anna T. Lee. The family had moved to the Boston area by 1910. In 1924, he was awarded the Rotch Traveling Scholarship, established by architect Arthur Rotch to provide an American student of architecture a minimum of eight months study and travel abroad. Kennedy joined M&W in 1926, and married Carol Gertrude Fox (1903-1975) in 1928. He became a senior partner in the firm in 1941, which became known as Maginnis and Walsh and Kennedy. Kennedy died November 7, 1986, in Jamaica Plain, Boston.

== Maginnis, Walsh and Sullivan (1898–1905) ==
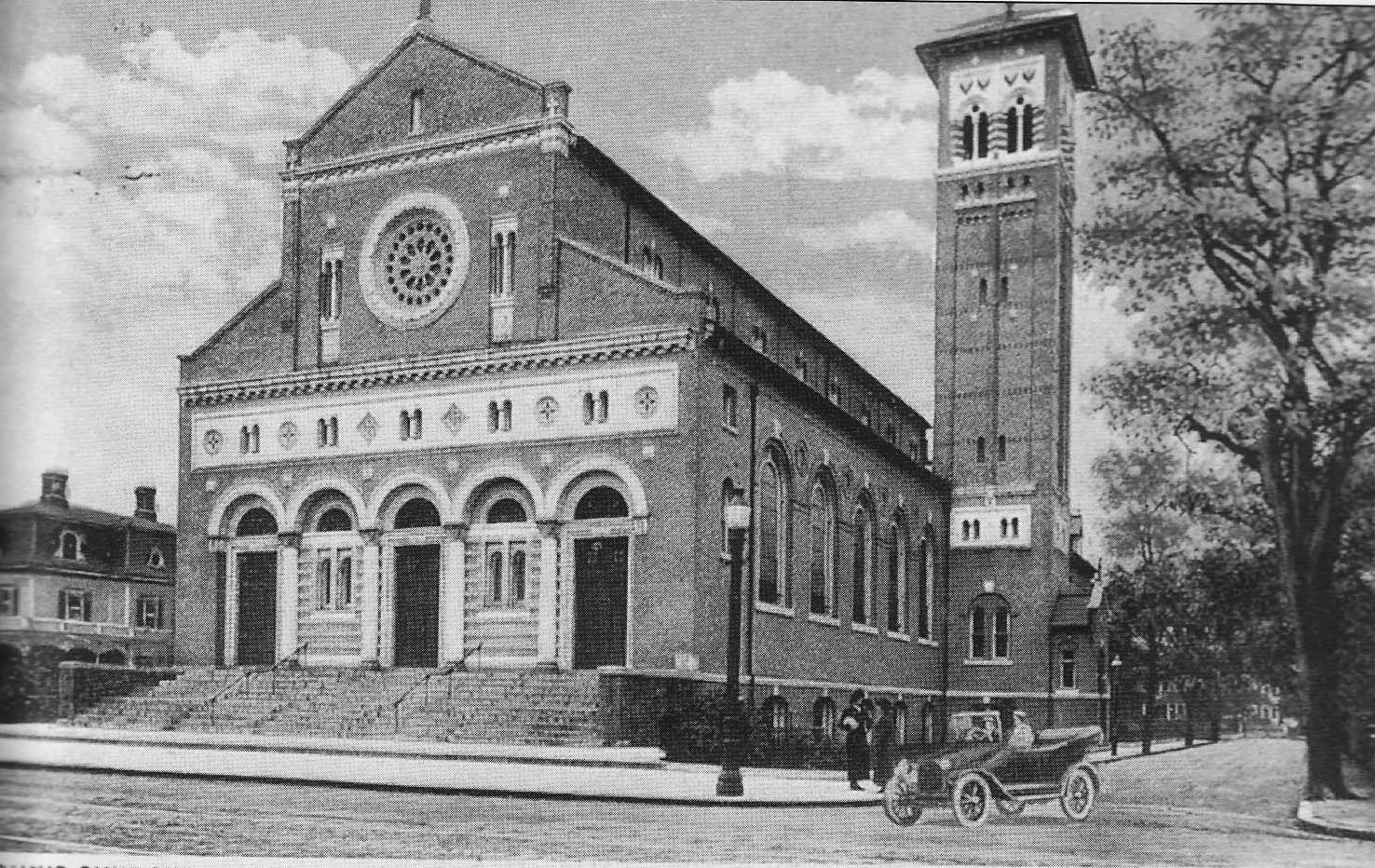
St. John the Evangelist Church in Cambridge, Massachusetts

- St. Patrick's Roman Catholic Church, Whitinsville, Massachusetts, Diocese of Worcester (1898). (very influential, referred to as the 'Concord Bridge' of Catholic church architecture, Maginnis' first church).
- St. John the Evangelist Church in Cambridge, Massachusetts: The church was built in 1904, largely built by Irish immigrants. House Speaker "Tip" O'Neill, was a lifelong parishioner. Modeled after a 12th-century Lombardo-Romanesque basilica, of four gold medals awarded to Maginnis, Walsh and Sullivan from the American Institute of Architects, one was for St. John's. It was added to the National Register of Historic Places in 1983.
- St. Thomas the Apostle Catholic Church in Los Angeles: The Mission Revival style church was built in 1904. The Los Angeles Times, said, "In its character this church unites itself with the days of the humble followers of St. Francis, as it is the same form and the same faith, is to a great degree of the same style of architecture and is carried on by the same authority as that of the olden days."

=== Brighton, Massachusetts ===
Now a neighborhood of Boston, Brighton was a farming community just northwest of the city. The farms became estates, the estates came into the possession of religious institutes. M&W had a number of commissions in Brighton.

One of the earliest was St. John's Seminary Chapel in Brighton, designed in 1898 in the Romanesque Revival style. It was constructed in 1899 of yellow and gray Brighton pudding stone with limestone trimmings. Our Lady of the Presentation Catholic Church in the Oak Square neighborhood of the Brighton section of Boston was begun in 1913 and completed in 1921. The parish closed in 2005; in 2013 the building was reopened as St. John's Seminary Our Lady of the Presentation Lecture Hall and Library.

The Convent of the Sisters of the Cenacle in Brighton was built in 1911. The building now houses the EF Language Institute.

In 1908, the Passionist Fathers purchased the David Nevins Estate in Brighton and built St. Gabriel's Monastery. In 1927, M&W was engaged to design a church to replace the chapel. St. Gabriel's is in the Renaissance Revival architecture style, constructed of buff-colored brick with cast stone accents and red mission tile roof. Due to personnel shortages, the monastery closed in 1978; St. Gabriel's Parish Church in 2006. In 2017 plans were approved to convert the monastery property into a combination of condominiums and apartments, largely geared to graduate students. The plan also has an affordable housing component. St. Gabriel's Church is to be retained and renovated as a community center.

== Maginnis and Walsh (1906–1940) ==
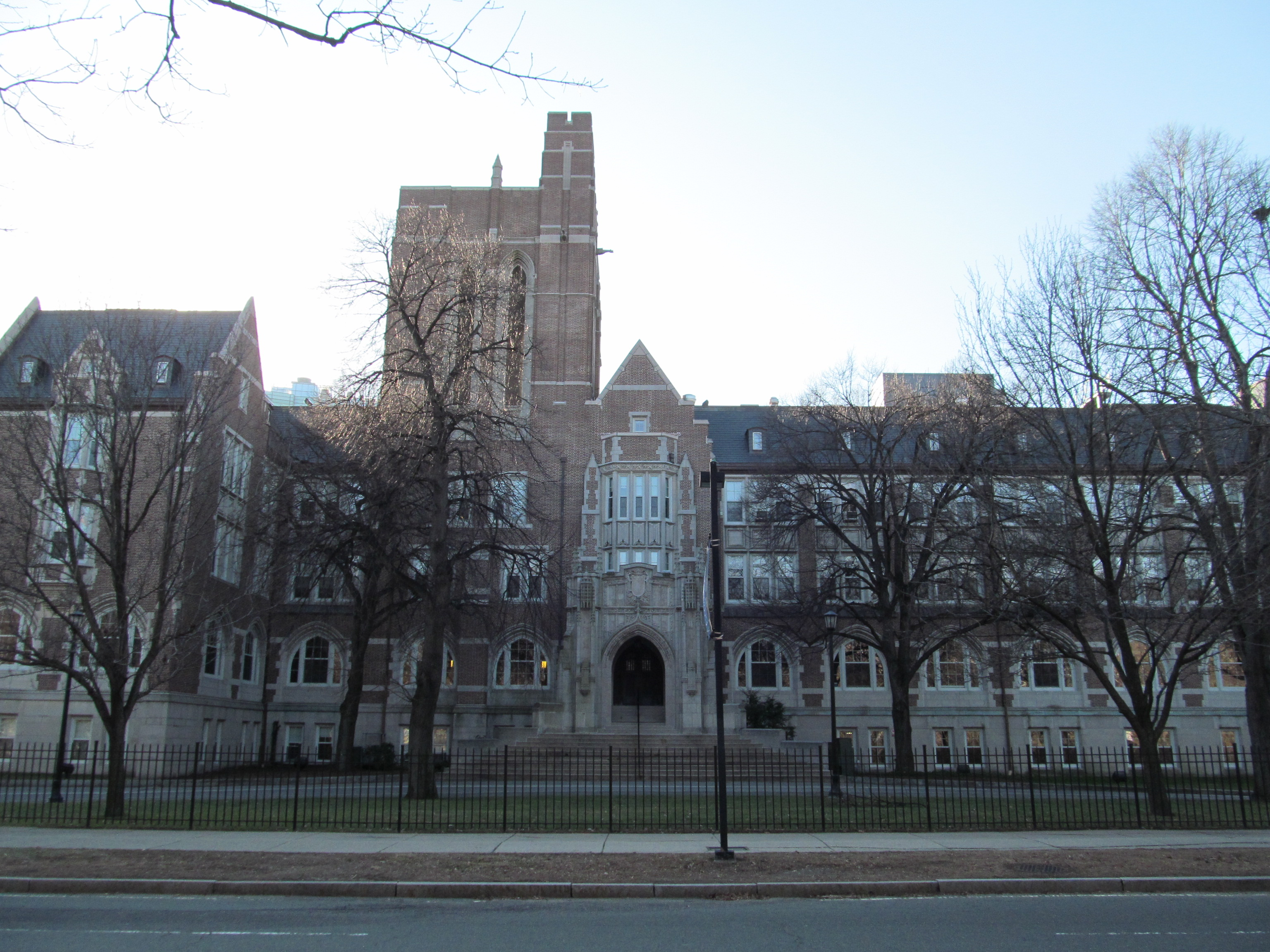
The Administration Building at Emmanuel College in Boston

In the Boston area, the firm built St. Catherine of Genoa Church on Spring Hill in Somerville, Massachusetts, regarded as a masterpiece. St. Catherine's, was begun in 1907 and completed in 1921. In July 2019, St. Catherine's. St. Ann's, and St. Thomas merged to form Sts. Louis and Zelie Martin Parish; masses are still scheduled at St. Catherine's.

St. Mary's School in Taunton, Massachusetts, built in 1907, is a three-story brick building in Collegiate Gothic style. The Girls' Latin School, Huntington Avenue Building was built in 1907 in collaboration with Peabody & Stearns and Coolidge & Carlson.

In 1914, the firm designed the administration building of Emmanuel College. Located in the Fens area of Boston, it was founded by the Sisters of Notre Dame de Namur and opened in 1919 as the first women's Catholic college in New England. For thirty years, it was the only building on campus.

The firm also designed St. Edward's church in Brockton, Massachusetts, in 1914. St. Edward's Church was founded in 1915, and merged with St. Nicholas Church in Abington, Massachusetts, in 2003, with the combined parish being renamed St. Edith Stein. St. Edith Stein parish bears striking resemblance to Ascension of Our Lord Church in Montreal, Canada, which is another church designed by the firm.

The Church of Ascension of Our Lord was built between 1927 and 1928, for the English-speaking Roman Catholic population in Westmount municipality of Montreal, Canada, on land originally belonging to the Grey Nuns. It was designed by Maginnis & Walsh of Boston, with Edward J. Turcotte of Montreal as Associate Architect. Its architect, Maginnis & Walsh was “based in Boston and was considered the foremost specialist in Catholic ecclesiastical architecture of the period. The church is built on a monumental scale. Although its architectural style looks to the Gothic churches of Europe, its construction was modern for the period: a steel frame, encased in brick or concrete and clad in Montreal limestone, with Berea sandstone trim. The plan is a conventional Latin cross, the intersection of the nave and the transepts marked by an imposing bell tower. The front façade, facing Sherbrooke Street, is dominated by a gabled wall, flanked by shallow buttresses. Three lancet windows surmount a secondary, projecting gable, which contains the central entrance.” Ascension of Our Lord Church's design may be based on or influenced by the firm's 1914 design of St. Edward's Church (now St. Edith Stein Church) in Brockton, MA.

In 1929 the firm designed Our Lady of Sorrows Church in South Orange, New Jersey, in the French Gothic style, to replace the 1889 St Mary's.

=== Boston College, Chestnut Hill ===
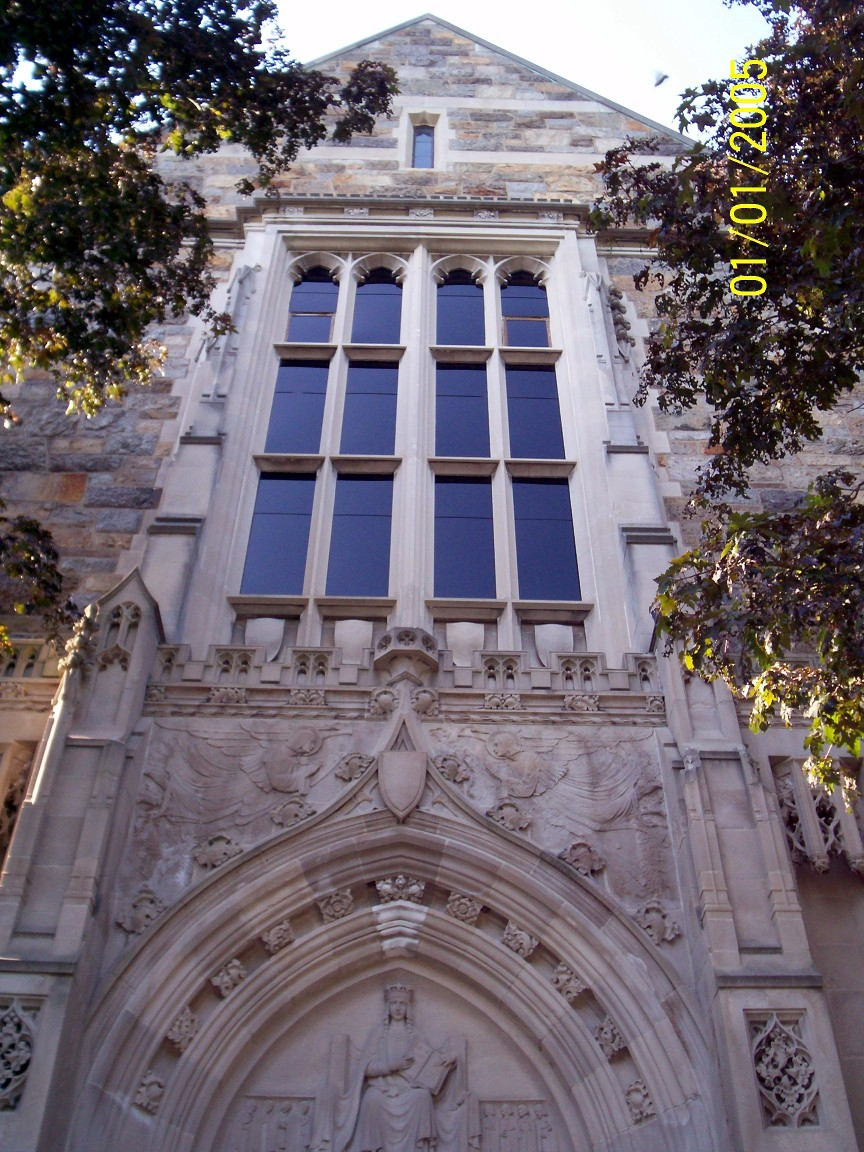
Bapst Library, Seat of Wisdom

Maginnis & Walsh won the bid to build the new campus of Boston College in Chestnut Hill, Massachusetts. Designed by Maginnis, in 1908, the Boston College campus is a seminal example of Collegiate Gothic architecture. Combining Gothic Revival architecture with principles of Beaux-Arts planning, Maginnis proposed a vast complex of academic buildings set in a cruciform plan. The design suggested an enormous outdoor cathedral, with the long entry drive at the "nave," the main quadrangle at the "apse" and secondary quadrangles at the "transepts."

Maginnis's design broke from the traditional Oxbridge models that had inspired it, and that had until then characterized Gothic architecture on American campuses. At the "crossing", Maginnis placed the university's main building. Using stone quarried on the site, the building was constructed at the highest point on Chestnut Hill, commanding a view of the surrounding landscape and the city to the east. In its unprecedented scale, Gasson Tower was conceived not as the belfry of a singular building, but as the crowning campanile of Maginnis' new "city upon a hill". Dominated by a soaring 200-foot bell tower, Recitation Hall was known simply as the "Tower Building" when it finally opened in 1913. Gasson Hall is credited for the typology of dominant Gothic towers in subsequent campus designs, including those at Princeton University (Cleveland Tower, 1913–1917), Yale University (Harkness Tower, 1917–1921), and Duke University (Chapel Tower, 1930–1935).

Although Maginnis' ambitious Gothic project never saw full completion due to the Wall Street Crash of 1929, its central portion was built according to plan and forms the core of what is now Boston College's middle campus. According to Boston College historian, Fr. Charles F. Donovan, Gasson Hall (1913), the signature building of Boston College, St. Mary's Hall and Chapel (1917), Devlin Hall (1924), and Bapst Library (commissioned 1922, completed 1928), called the "finest example of Collegiate Gothic architecture in America"), are the "original architectural gems" of the campus.

In 1926, the Devlin Hall science building won the Harleston Parker Medal for "most beautiful building in Boston". M&W also built Fulton Hall (1948), Lyons Hall (1951), St. Thomas More Hall (1954 -demolished 2014), and Campion (1955).

Maginnis also designed the chancel at Trinity Church in Copley Square, the high altar at St. Patrick's Cathedral in Midtown Manhattan, and the Massachusetts Veterans War Memorial Tower on the summit of Mount Greylock.

The firm also built St. Aidan's Church in Brookline, Massachusetts in 1911, where Maginnis was a parishioner and where former U.S. President John F. Kennedy was christened; St. Aidan's, has since been closed and converted to housing.

== Maginnis and Walsh and Kennedy (1941–1956) ==
Maginnis designed the bronze doors at St. Patrick's Cathedral to replace the original wooden ones. Each 16 1/2-foot by 5 1/2-foot door weighs 9,200 pounds and is decorated with sculptures of saints created by John Angel. The doors were blessed by Cardinal Spellman and opened for the first time just before Christmas 1949. In 2013, the doors underwent a major conservation and restoration.

Maginnis and Walsh were the original architects for St. Julia Church, in Weston, Massachusetts, in 1919. The firm returned in 1961 to design an addition to the back of St. Julia Church to increase seating capacity.

== Works ==
=== Archdiocese of Boston ===
- Immaculate Conception Lithuanian Church, Cambridge, Massachusetts: dedicated 1913, sold in 2007 and repurposed for affordable housing.
- St. Catherine of Sienna Church, Norwood, Massachusetts
- St. George Church, Norwood, Massachusetts
- Most Blessed Sacrament Church, Greenwood, Wakefield, Massachusetts
- Campion Renewal Center (former Jesuit Novitiate), Weston, Massachusetts
- St. Paul Church, Dorchester, Massachusetts
- St. Theresa of Avila Church, West Roxbury, Massachusetts
- Our Lady of Mercy Church, Belmont, Massachusetts
- St. Raphael Church, Medford, Massachusetts (destroyed, replaced by Keefe Associates)
- St. Angela Church, Mattapan, Massachusetts (superstructure, basement by Patrick C. Keely)
- St. Teresa Church, Watertown, Massachusetts (closed, converted to housing)
- St. Aidan Church, Brookline, Massachusetts (closed, converted to housing)
- St. Edith Stein Church, Brockton, Massachusetts (formerly St. Edward's Church)
- Sacred Heart Church, Roslindale, Massachusetts (replacement of destroyed tower, interior redesign of 1890 Patrick W. Ford church)
- Sacred Heart School, Roslindale, Massachusetts
- Sacred Heart Church, Manchester, Massachusetts (demolished)
- St. Mathias Church, Marlboro, Massachusetts
- Trinity Episcopal Church, Copley Square, Boston, Massachusetts (chancel remodeling of famous H.H. Richardson church)

=== Diocese of Worcester ===
- St. Joseph Church, Fitchburg, Massachusetts
- St. Leo Church, Leominster, Massachusetts
- Dinand Library, College of the Holy Cross, Worcester, Massachusetts
- St. Joseph's Chapel, College of the Holy Cross, Worcester, Massachusetts

=== Diocese of Fall River ===
- St. James Church, New Bedford, Massachusetts (alteration to church by Patrick W. Ford)
- Holy Name Church, New Bedford, Massachusetts
- St. Joseph Church, Taunton, Massachusetts
- Holy Family Church, East Taunton, Massachusetts
- St. William Church, Fall River, Massachusetts (basement only)
- Holy Name Church, Fall River, Massachusetts
- Our Lady of the Immaculate Conception Church, Fall River, Massachusetts (demolished)
- St. John the Evangelist Church, Pocasset, Massachusetts
- St. John the Evangelist, Attleboro, Massachusetts
- St. Margaret Church, Buzzards Bay, Massachusetts
- St. Patrick Church, Falmouth, Massachusetts
- St. Teresa Church, Sagamore, Massachusetts
- St. Bernard Church, Assonet, Massachusetts
- Holy Trinity Church, Brewster, Massachusetts
- Holy Trinity Church, West Harwich, Massachusetts (burned, replaced)
- St. Patrick Church, Wareham, Massachusetts
- St. John The Evangelist Church, Attleboro, Massachusetts
- St. Mary of the Assumption Rectory

=== Diocese of Springfield ===
Blessed Sacrament Church, Northampton, Massachusetts

=== Diocese of Providence ===
- St. Raymond Church, Providence, Rhode Island (demolished)

=== Diocese of Burlington, Vermont ===
- St. Stephen Church, Winooski, Vermont
- St. Dominic Church, Proctor, Vermont
- Christ the King Church, Rutland, Vermont

=== Diocese of Portland, Maine ===
- Sacred Heart Church, Hallowell, Maine
- Immaculate Conception Church, Fairfield, Maine

=== Archdiocese of Hartford ===
- Basilica of The Immaculate Conception, Waterbury, Connecticut

=== Archdiocese of Cincinnati ===
- St. Louis Church, Cincinnati, Ohio
- St. Joseph Church, Dayton, Ohio
- Holy Angels Church, Dayton, Ohio

=== Archdiocese of New York ===
- St. Andrew Church, Manhattan (with Robert J. Reilly)
- Regis High School
- St. Patrick's Cathedral, Midtown Manhattan (new Lady Chapel altar, new high altar and Baldachino, cathedral designed by James Renwick Jr.)
- Maryknoll Seminary Building, Ossining, New York

=== Diocese of Brooklyn ===
- Our Lady Queen of Martyrs Church, Forest Hills, New York

=== Diocese of Albany ===
- St. James Church (now St. Francis of Assisi Church), Albany, New York

=== Diocese of Ogdensburg ===
- St. Mary's Cathedral, Ogdensburg, New York

=== Diocese of Marquette (Michigan) ===
- St. Peter Cathedral, Marquette, Michigan

=== Archdiocese of Newark ===
- Our Lady of Sorrows Church, South Orange, New Jersey
- Holy Name of Jesus Church, East Orange, New Jersey
- St. Vincent DePaul Church, Bayonne, New Jersey

=== Archdiocese of Baltimore ===
- Cathedral of Mary Our Queen, Baltimore, Maryland
- St. Ambrose Church, Baltimore, Maryland
- Chapel, St. Mary Seminary, Baltimore, Maryland
- Church, Loyola College, Baltimore, Maryland
- Our Lady of Lourdes Chapel, Georgetown Preparatory School, Garrett Park, Maryland

=== Archdiocese of Philadelphia ===
- Holy Name Church, Philadelphia, Pennsylvania
- Carmelite Monastery, Philadelphia, Pennsylvania, 1914

=== Diocese of Scranton ===
- St. Paul Church, Scranton, Pennsylvania

=== Archdiocese of Washington, D.C. ===
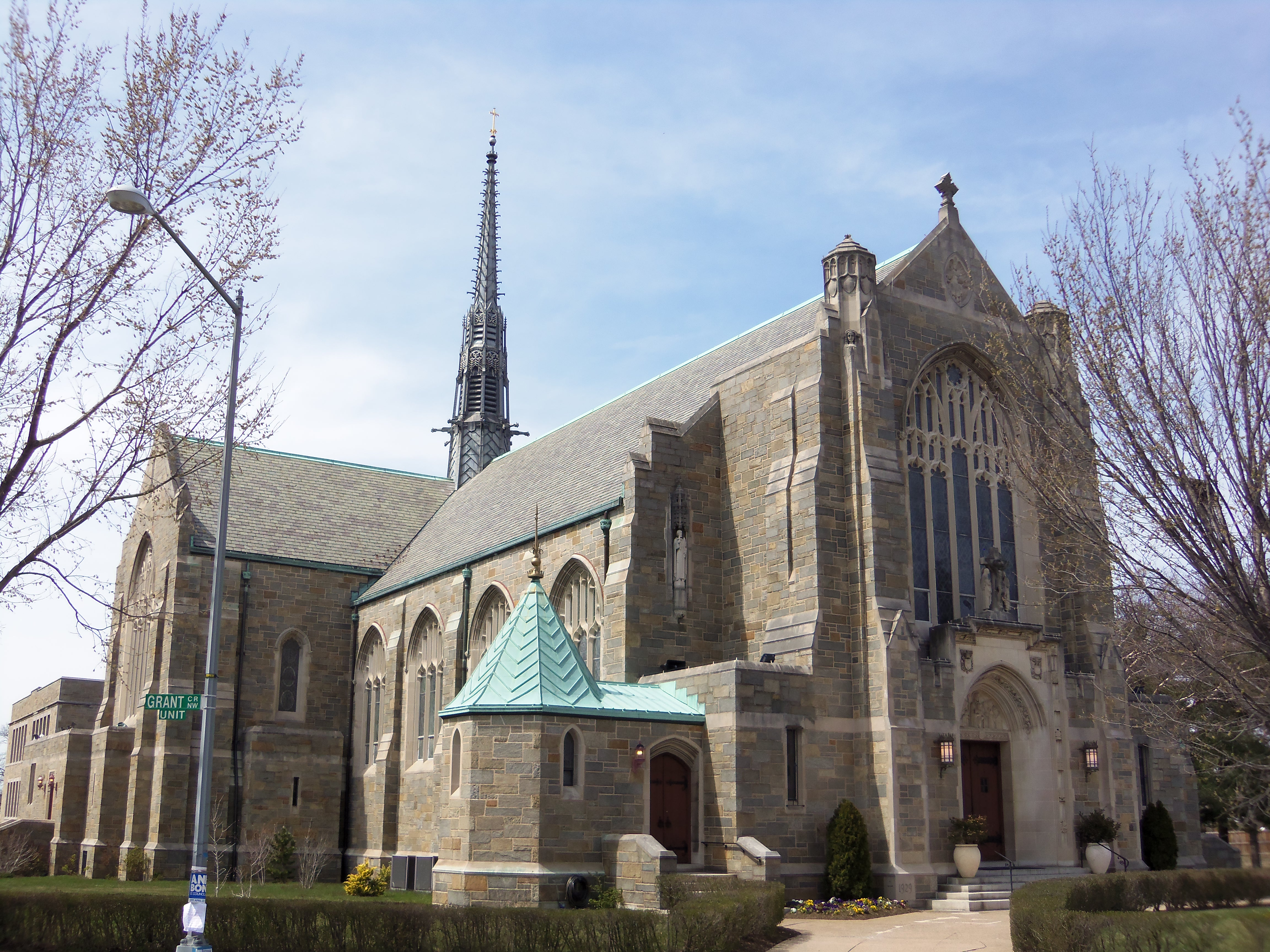
St. Gabriel's Church on Grant Circle in the Petworth neighborhood of Washington, D.C.

- Basilica of the National Shrine of the Immaculate Conception, Washington, D.C.
- Sacred Heart Church, Washington, D.C. (Murphy & Olmsted, architects, Maginnis and Walsh, associate architects)
- Chapel, Trinity College, Washington, D.C.
- St. Gabriel Church, Washington, D.C.
- New Apostolic Mission House, Washington, D.C.

=== Diocese of Gary, Indiana ===
- unnamed church, Gary, Indiana

=== Archdiocese of Milwaukee ===
- St. Robert Church, Shorewood, Wisconsin

=== Archdiocese of San Francisco ===
- Carmelite Monastery, Santa Clara, California

=== Archdiocese of Los Angeles ===
- Cathedral of Saint Vibiana, Los Angeles, California (plans submitted but cathedral not built)
- St Agnes Church, Los Angeles
- Our Lady Queen of Angels Church, Los Angeles

=== Archdiocese of Dubuque ===
- unnamed church, Dubuque, Iowa

=== Diocese of Des Moines ===
- All Saints Church, Stuart, Iowa
- St. Anthony Church, Des Moines, Iowa
- St. Augustin Church, Des Moines, Iowa
- Basilica of St. John, Des Moines, Iowa

=== Diocese of Cheyenne ===
- Chapel, St. Joseph's Children's Home, Torrington, Wyoming
- Our Lady of Sorrows Church, Rock Springs, Wyoming

== Schools, colleges, universities, and seminaries ==
=== Catholic University of America, Washington, D.C. ===
- Basilica of the National Shrine of the Immaculate Conception (started in 1919; completed 1959), the largest Catholic Church in North America "The architectural style is composite of a Romanesque exterior and a Byzantine interior."

=== Georgetown Preparatory School, North Bethesda, MD ===
- Our Lady of the Lourdes Chapel

=== College of the Holy Cross, Worcester, MA ===
- Dinand Library – 1927
- Saint Joseph Memorial Chapel – 1922

=== Nazareth Hall Preparatory Seminary, Minnesota ===
- Nazareth Hall – 1923
- Nazareth Hall Chapel – 1923
- Island Chapel and Peninsula – 1925

=== Newton Country Day School of the Sacred Heart ===
- Chapel and four-story wing

=== Regis High School, New York City, NY ===
Source:

=== Sacred Heart School, Fall River, MA ===
Source:

=== Saint Gregory Seminary (now Mount Saint Mary of the West - the Athenaeum of Ohio), Cincinnati, Ohio ===
- Southeast wing - 1929
- Northwest wing - 1961
- Chapel of Saint Gregory the Great - 1961

=== Saint Joseph's School, Wakefield, MA – 1924 ===
Source:

=== Saint Joseph College, West Hartford, CT ===
- McDonough and Mercy Halls – 1935

=== St. Mary's Seminary and University, Baltimore, MD ===
- Main Administration Building – 1929 (Beaux Arts Classical Revival Style)

=== Trinity Washington University (formerly Trinity College), Washington, D.C. ===
- Notre Dame Chapel – 1924
- Alumnae Hall – 1929

=== University of Notre Dame, South Bend, IN ===
- Biolchini Hall of Law – 1930
- Alumni Hall – 1931
- Dillon Hall – 1931
- Knights of Columbus (formerly Old Post Office) – 1934
- Student Health Center (now St. Liam's Hall) – 1934
- Cavanaugh Hall – 1936
- Haggar Hall (formerly Biology Building) – 1937
- Zahm Hall – 1937
- Breen-Phillips Hall – 1939
- Facilities Building (formerly Ave Maria Press)- 1940
- Hessert Laboratory for Aerospace Research (formerly Heat and Power Laboratory) – 1941
- Farley Hall – 1947
- Nieuwland Science Hall – 1952

== Hospitals ==
=== Boston Children's Hospital ===
References to "Children's Hospital" are found in "[Boston] City Auditor's of the Receipts and Expenses" Reports (1912–1913, 1913–1914, 1914–1915); and the "Documents City of Boston, For The Year 1914."

Uncertain if this facility is within the "Boston Consumptives Hospital" campus or a separate facility altogether.

=== Boston Consumptives Hospital (Boston Sanatorium) ===
A "tuberculosis hospital," this 52-acres campus had 18 buildings), Dorchester, MA

- Administration or Foley Building (1910, 1928–1930), the largest building on campus
- Doctors' residences, Dormitories or Wards (4) (ca. 1910), currently vacant and are decaying as of 2016
- The Power House (1903)

== Outside United States ==
- Ascension of Our Lord Church, Westmount, Montreal, Quebec, Canada
- Holy Redeemer Cathedral, Corner Brook, Newfoundland, Canada
- Our Lady of the Snows Church, Campbellton New Brunswick, Canada
- St. Patrick Church, Mexico City, Mexico
- St. Peter's Seminary, London, Ontario, Canada

== See also ==
- Maginnis, Walsh and Sullivan
