= Charles Donagh Maginnis =

Irish-American architect (1867–1955)

Charles Donagh Maginnis FAIA
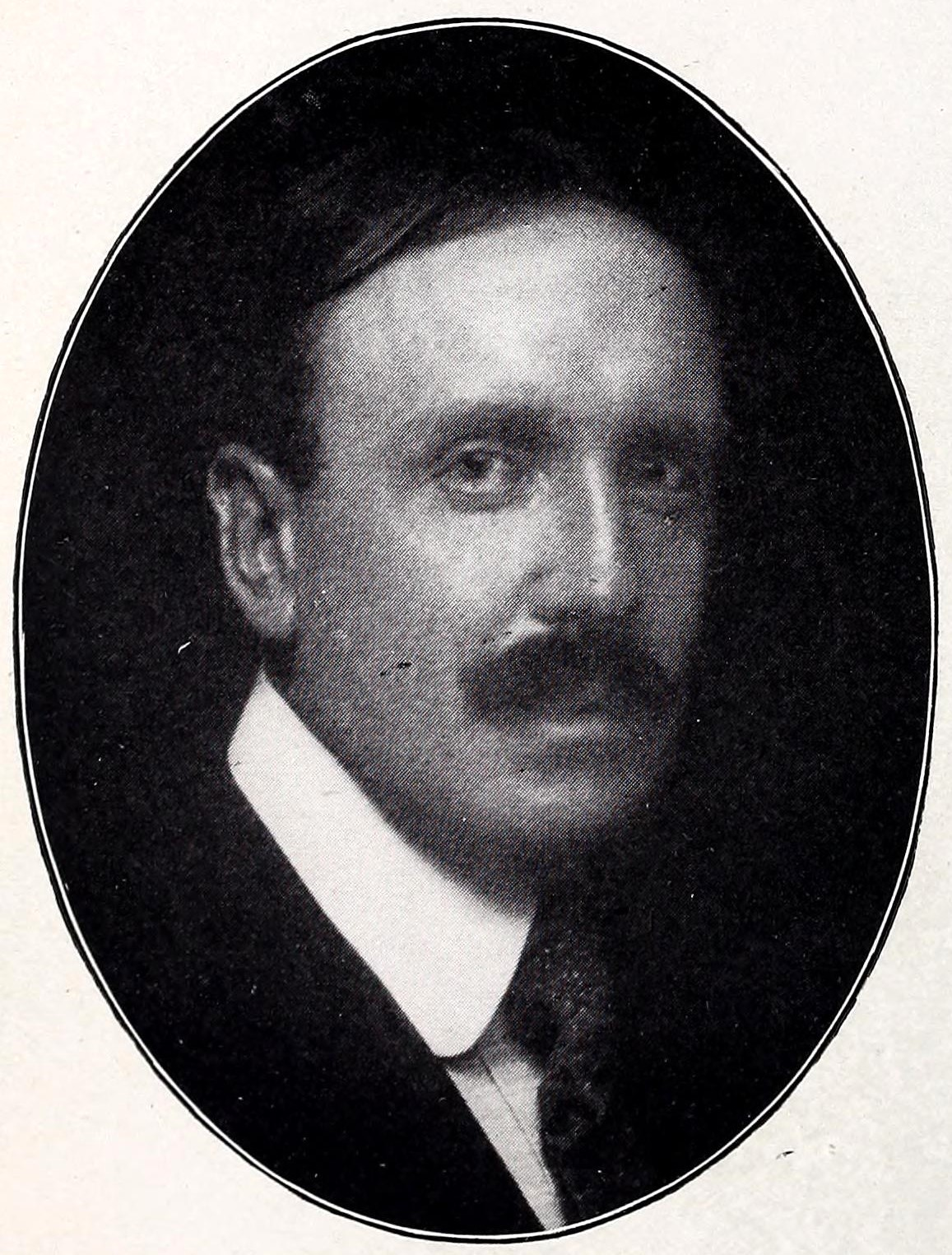
- Born: January 7, 1867; County Londonderry, Ireland
- Died: February 15, 1955 (aged 88); Boston, Massachusetts, U.S.
- Burial place: Holyhood Cemetery
- Occupation: Architect
- Awards: AIA Gold Medal (1948)
- Buildings: Basilica of the National Shrine of the Immaculate Conception; Boston College

26th President of the American Institute of Architects
- In office 1937–1939
- Preceded by: Stephen F. Voorhees
- Succeeded by: George Bergstrom

Charles Donagh Maginnis (January 7, 1867 – February 15, 1955) was an Irish-American architect. He emigrated to Boston at age 18, trained as an architect and went on to form the firm Maginnis & Walsh, designing ecclesiastical and campus buildings across America. From 1937 to 1939, Maginnis held the office of President of the American Institute of Architects.

== Biography ==
Maginnis was born in County Londonderry, Ireland, on January 7, 1867. He was educated in Dublin, emigrated to Boston at age 18 and got his first job apprenticing for architect Edmund M. Wheelwright as a draftsman. In 1900, he became a member of the Boston Society of Architects, serving as its president from 1924 to 1926. Though he worked in a number of styles, Maginnis became a distinguished proponent of Gothic architecture and an articulate writer and orator on the role of architecture in society. His pioneering work both influenced and was influenced by fellow Gothicist Ralph Adams Cram.

In 1898, Maginnis went into partnership with Timothy Walsh and Matthew Sullivan to form Maginnis, Walsh and Sullivan. This was the same year he designed St. Patrick Roman Catholic Church in Whitinsville, Massachusetts. This commission started his career designing buildings for the Roman Catholic Church. In 1906, Sullivan withdrew and the firm was renamed Maginnis & Walsh. This firm would become one of the leading architectural firms in the first half of the 20th century. In 1909, Maginnis & Walsh won the competition to build the new campus of Boston College in Chestnut Hill, Massachusetts. The collegiate Gothic design was deemed "the most beautiful campus in America" by The American Architect magazine and established the firm's reputation in collegiate and ecclesiastical architecture. Maginnis & Walsh went on to design buildings at over twenty-five colleges and universities around the country, including the main buildings at Emmanuel College, Boston, the chapel at Trinity College and the law school at the University of Notre Dame. Moreover, the design of Gasson Tower at Boston College is considered a predecessor of the dominant towers of collegiate Gothic campuses such as Harkness Tower at Yale University and the chapel tower at Duke University by Horace Trumbauer of 1930–1935.

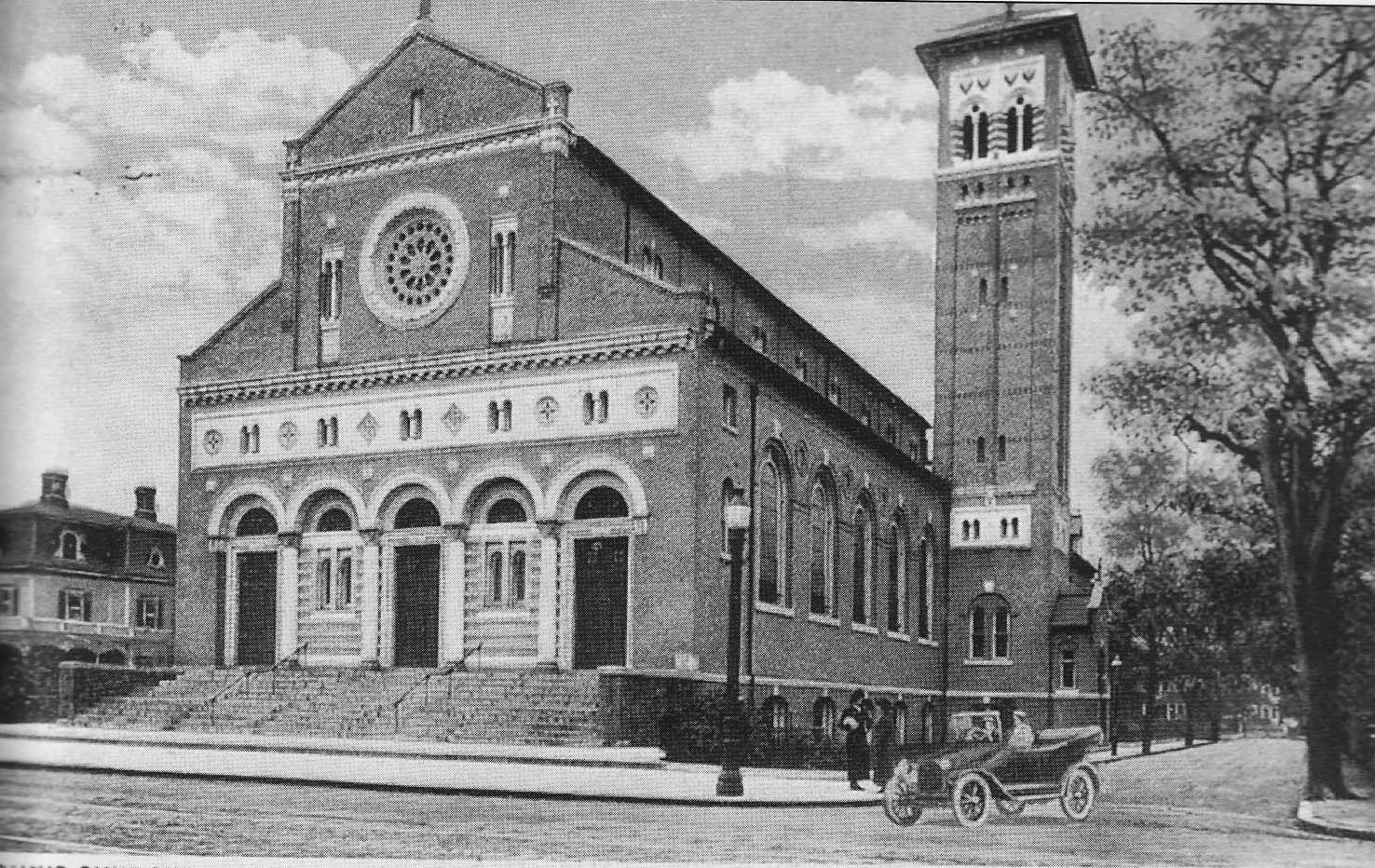
St. John the Evangelist R.C. Church in North Cambridge, Massachusetts

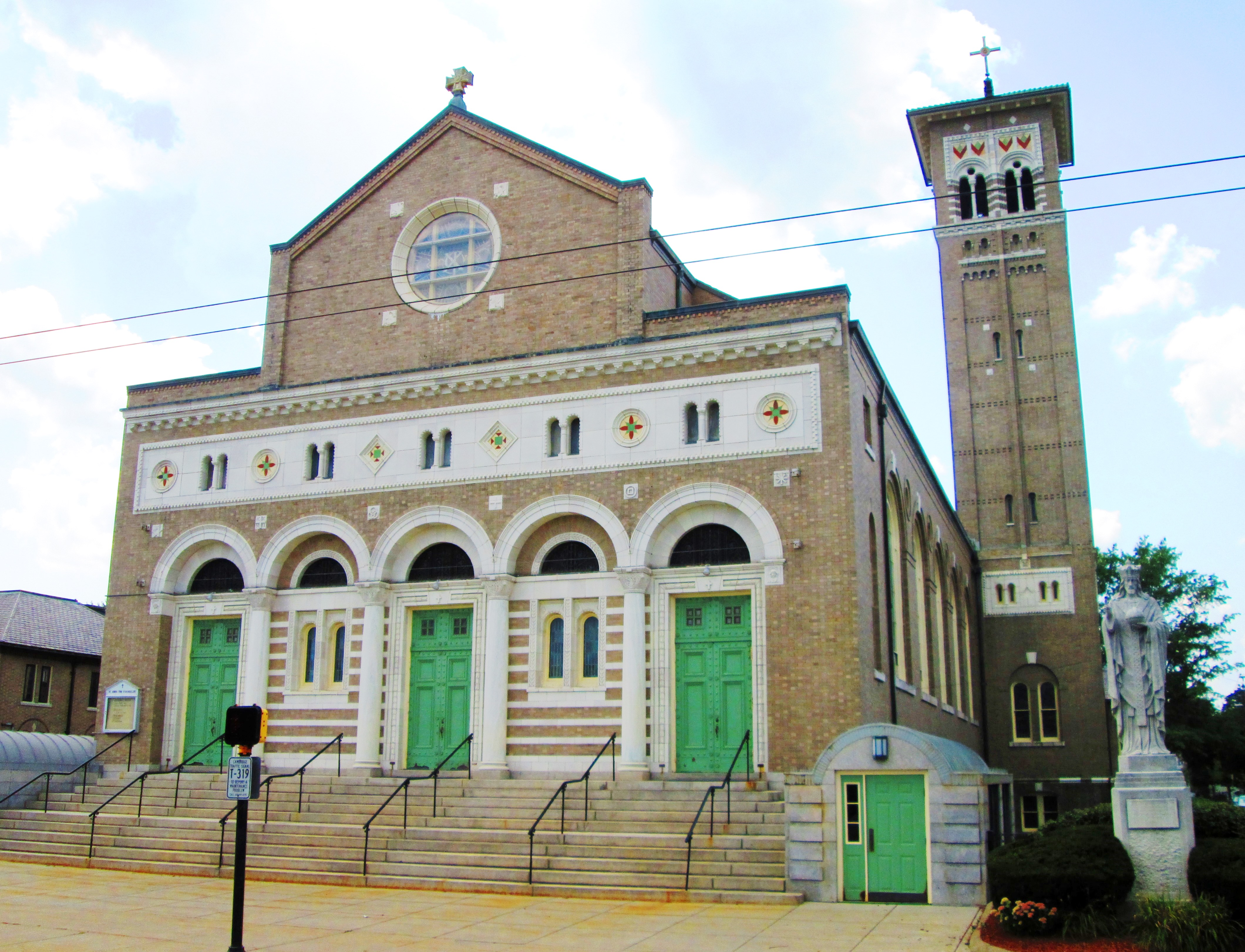

In the Boston area, Maginnis also built the church of St. Catherine of Genoa in Somerville, Massachusetts, St. John The Evangelist in Cambridge and St. Aidan's Church in Brookline, Massachusetts, where he was a parishioner along with the Kennedy family and other prominent Irish-Americans. St. Aidan's, the location of the christening of John F. Kennedy, has since been closed and may be converted into housing in the near future. In other parts of the country he designed the Basilica of the National Shrine of the Immaculate Conception in Washington, D.C., the Cathedral of Mary Our Queen in Baltimore and the interior of Emmanual Masqueray's Basilica of St Mary in Minneapolis as well as the sacristy and rectory for the Cathedral of St. Paul in Saint Paul. Among his other designs are the chancel at Trinity Church in Boston's Copley Square and the high altar at St. Patrick's Cathedral, New York.

From 1937 to 1939, Maginnis held the office of President of the American Institute of Architects. In 1948, the Institute presented him with the Gold Medal for "outstanding service to American architecture," the highest award in the profession. He received honorary degrees from, among others, Boston College, Harvard, Holy Cross, Notre Dame and Tufts. He died at St. Elizabeth's Hospital in Boston, Massachusetts in 1955 and was buried at Holyhood Cemetery.

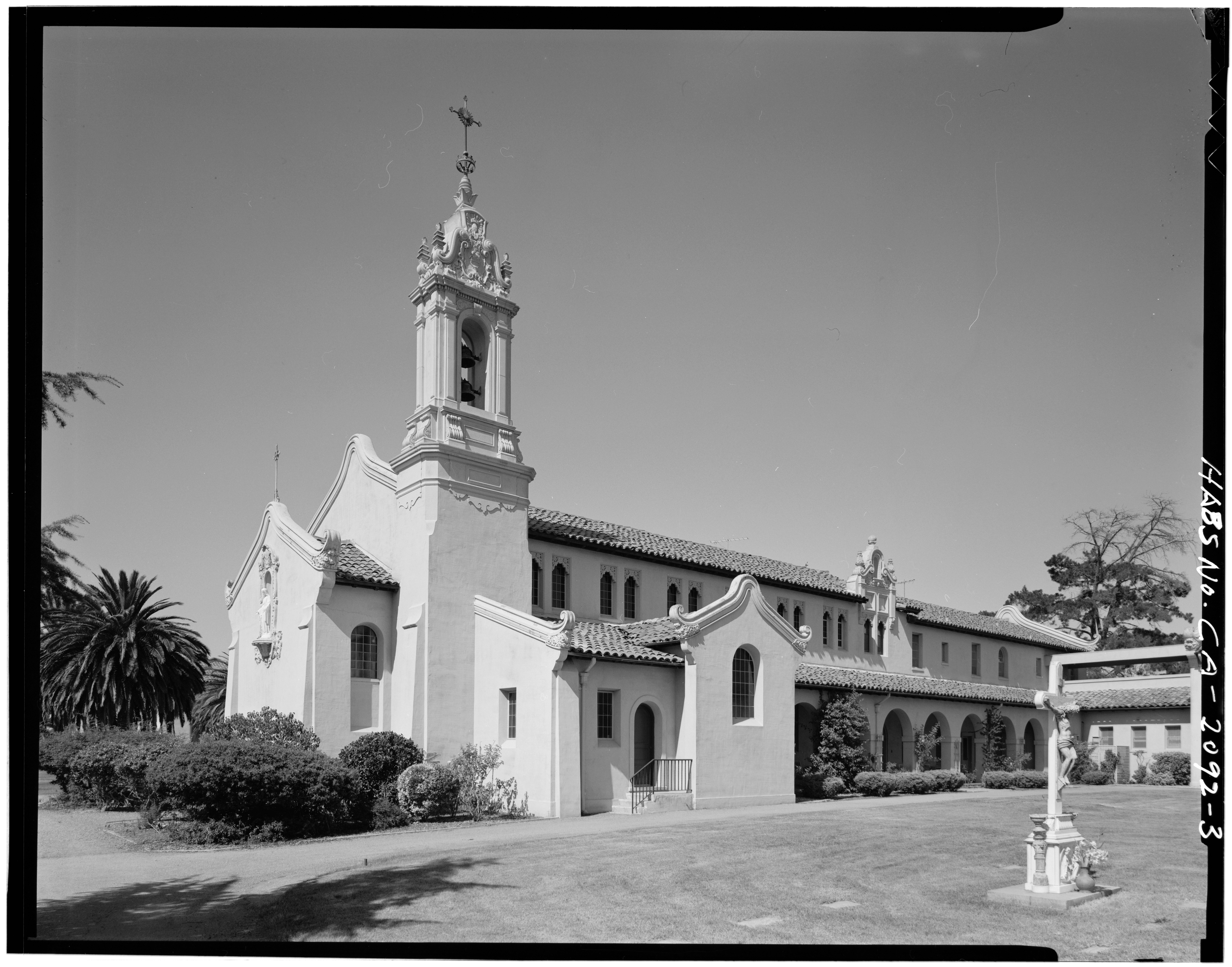
Maryknoll seminary in Cupertino, California

The Charles D. Maginnis archives and the Maginnis & Walsh archives are housed at the Burns Library of Rare Books and Special Collections at Boston College. The Maginnis & Walsh collection at the Boston Public Library contains work of the architectural firm from 1913 to 1952.
