= Basilica of the Immaculate Conception (Waterbury, Connecticut) =

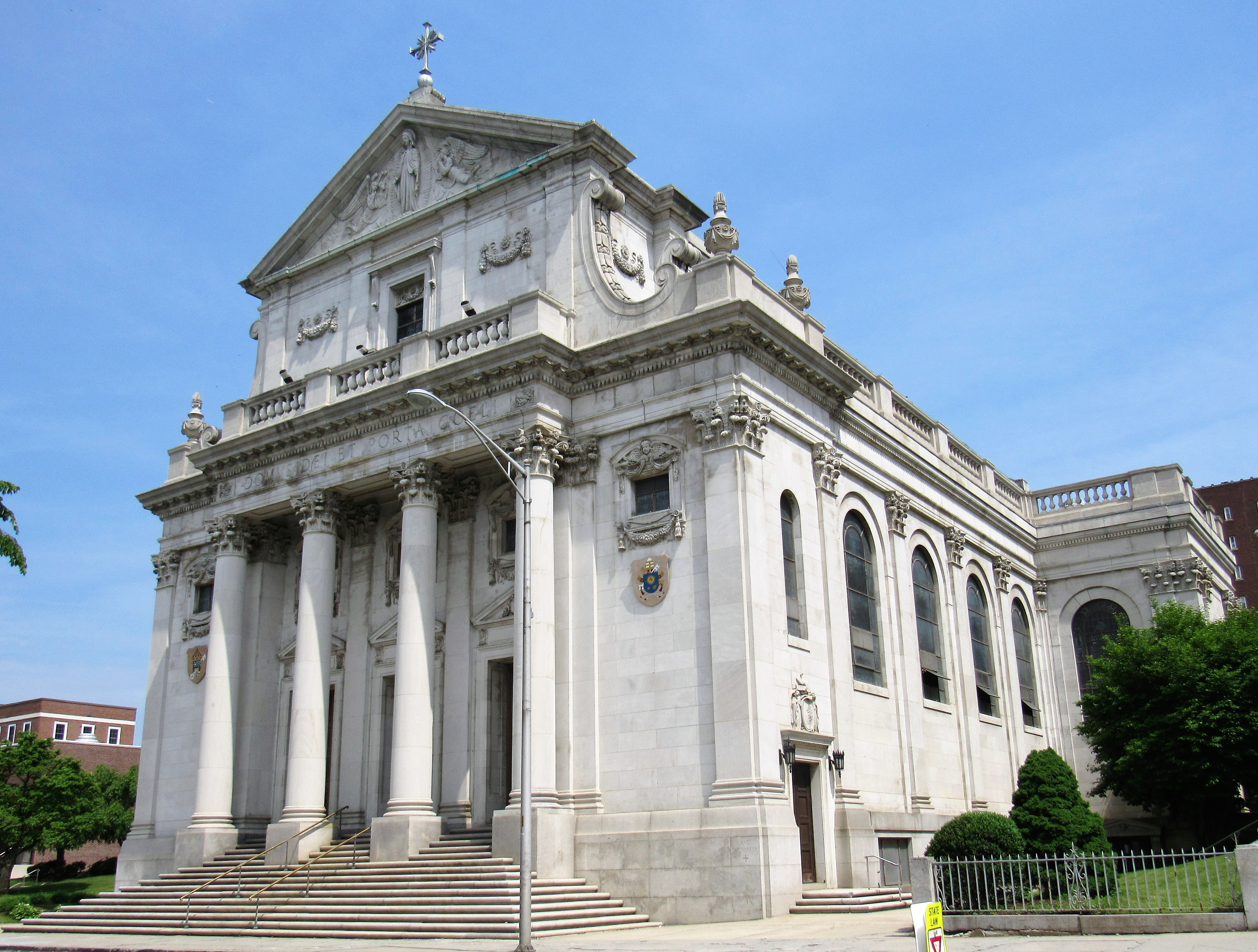

- Location in Connecticut
- 41°33′26″N 73°02′30″W
- Location: 74 West Main Street; Waterbury, Connecticut
- Country: United States
- Denomination: Catholic Church
- Website: www.waterburybasilica.org

History
- Former name: Immaculate Conception Church
- Status: Minor Basilica/Parish church
- Founded: 1872
- Consecrated: May 15, 1962

Architecture
- Heritage designation
- Basilica of the Immaculate Conception
- U.S. Historic district – Contributing property
- Built by: Tracy Brothers Co.
- Part of: Downtown Waterbury Historic District (ID83001280)
- Added to NRHP: August 3, 1983
- Architect: Maginnis & Walsh
- Architectural type: Italian Renaissance
- Completed: 1928
- Construction cost: US $1.25 million

Specifications
- Capacity: 1,500
- Length: 170 ft (52 m)
- Materials: Limestone

Administration
- Archdiocese: Hartford

Clergy
- Archbishop: Most Rev. Christopher Coyne
- Rector: Very Rev. James M. Sullivan

The Basilica of the Immaculate Conception is a Roman Catholic church located at 74 West Main Street in Waterbury, Connecticut.

== History ==
Early accounts say that the first priest to visit Waterbury was one James Fitton of Hartford. He was followed by Rev. James McDermot of New Haven, who said Mass in the house of Cornelius Donnelly. McDermot was transferred to Lowell in the summer off 1837, and Waterbury became a mission station of St. Mary's in New Haven. Rev. James Smyth served the community for the next ten years. On his first arrival, Smyth thought to say Mass in the same house frequented by McDermot but was told by the tenant that the landlord had threatened eviction if he entertained anymore priests. He then said Mass at the home of Michael Neville on East Main Street. In 1845, Washington Hall, on the corner of Exchange Place and West Main Street was rented from Dr. Jesse Porter.

In 1847, the Catholic community purchased a former Episcopal church and sought to move it to a lot on the corner of East Main and Dublin Streets. However, on approaching the desired location, the contractor, Major D. Hill of Hartford, was convinced that he could not get the structure safely over the high ground, so Neville, acting as agent for the Catholics, purchased a second, more accessible lot. Except for when Smyth visited Waterbury, baptisms, marriages, and funerals took place in New Haven. Bishop Tyler of Hartford purchased a lot south of Grand Street through John Galvin for use as a burying ground.

In October 1847, Rev. Michael O’Neil became the first resident pastor and dedicated the parish to St. Peter. Initially O'Neil resided with the family of Michael Neville, on Dublin Street opposite the cemetery gate. In 1850, he rented a house on East Main Street from John Sandland. In December 1854, a fire broke out in the church, but managed to be extinguished by those present before it got out of control. In 1855, O'Neil was sued for trespass by the Protestant husband of a Catholic woman for administering last rites pursuant to the woman's wishes. O'Neil was fined $150 plus costs. O'Neil stated the under no circumstances would he divulge the content of the woman's confession. The judge said that it was not essential to deciding the case, but if it had been, he would have required it of the priest. This is in marked contrast to a case in New York involving Rev. Anthony Kohlmann some twenty-five years previous.

In July 1855, O'Neil went to East Bridgeport and was succeeded at St. Peter's by Rev. T.F. Hendricken. Hendricken hired Patrick Keely to design a new, larger church. On July 5, 1857, the parish laid the cornerstone for a new church, in the Gothic style. Built of red brick, with a tall spire, it stood on East Main Street. It was dedicated by Bishop McFarland, and renamed in honor of the Immaculate Conception, the first church in the United States to bear that title since the 1854 decree. The old church became St. Mary's school in 1863.

In 1869 he persuaded the Congregation of Notre Dame of Montreal to come to the parish, where they established Notre Dame Academy, a day and boarding school for girls. He also purchased land for St. Joseph's Cemetery. In 1872, Hendricken was named Bishop of Providence.

Since the 1990s the former Trinity Episcopal Church on Prospect St. was used as a parish center. Due to structural problems, the building was demolished in 2018. Some of the stained glass and altars from the church were removed and given to other churches in Connecticut.

== Current church ==
Ground was broken for the current church in 1924 and it was dedicated May 20, 1928 by Bishop John Joseph Nilan. It was designed by the Boston firm of Maginnis & Walsh and cost US$1.25 million to construct. Its Italian Renaissance design is based on the Basilica of St. Mary Major in Rome

On February 9, 2008, Pope Benedict XVI bestowed the title of Minor Basilica on the church.

== Organ ==
The Austin Organ Company, based in Hartford, Connecticut, constructed the pipe organ in the Basilica. Its four divisions are located behind decorative wood panels flanking the gallery. The instrument was built in 1928 and has received modifications over the years including a new console in 1970 and some restoration work by the Foley Baker Company in 1980. The organ is Austin Opus 1522 with 3 manuals and 27 ranks. The parish has engaged the Austin Organ Service Company of Avon, Connecticut to complete a restoration of the instrument in 2013.

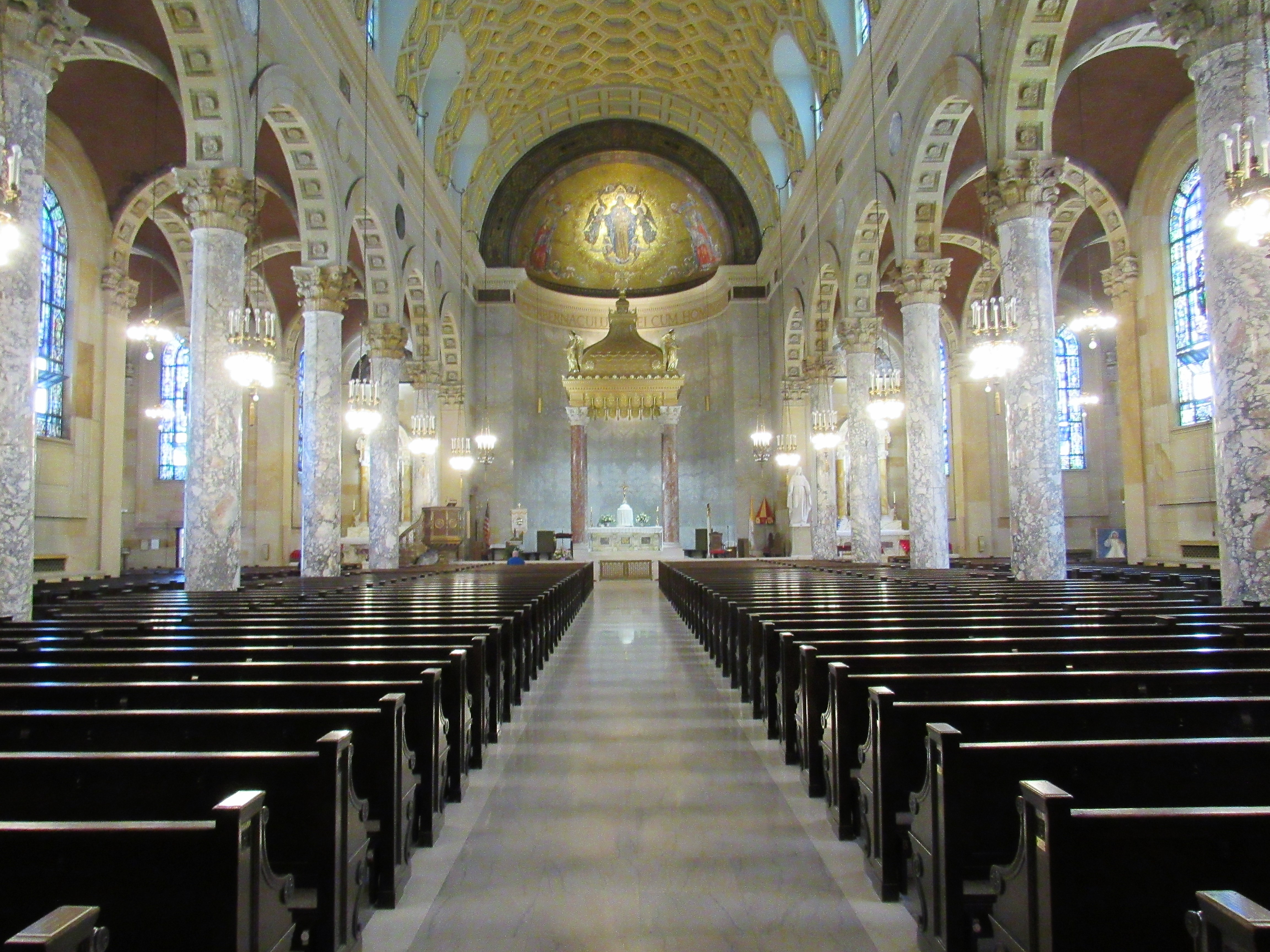
Basilica interior

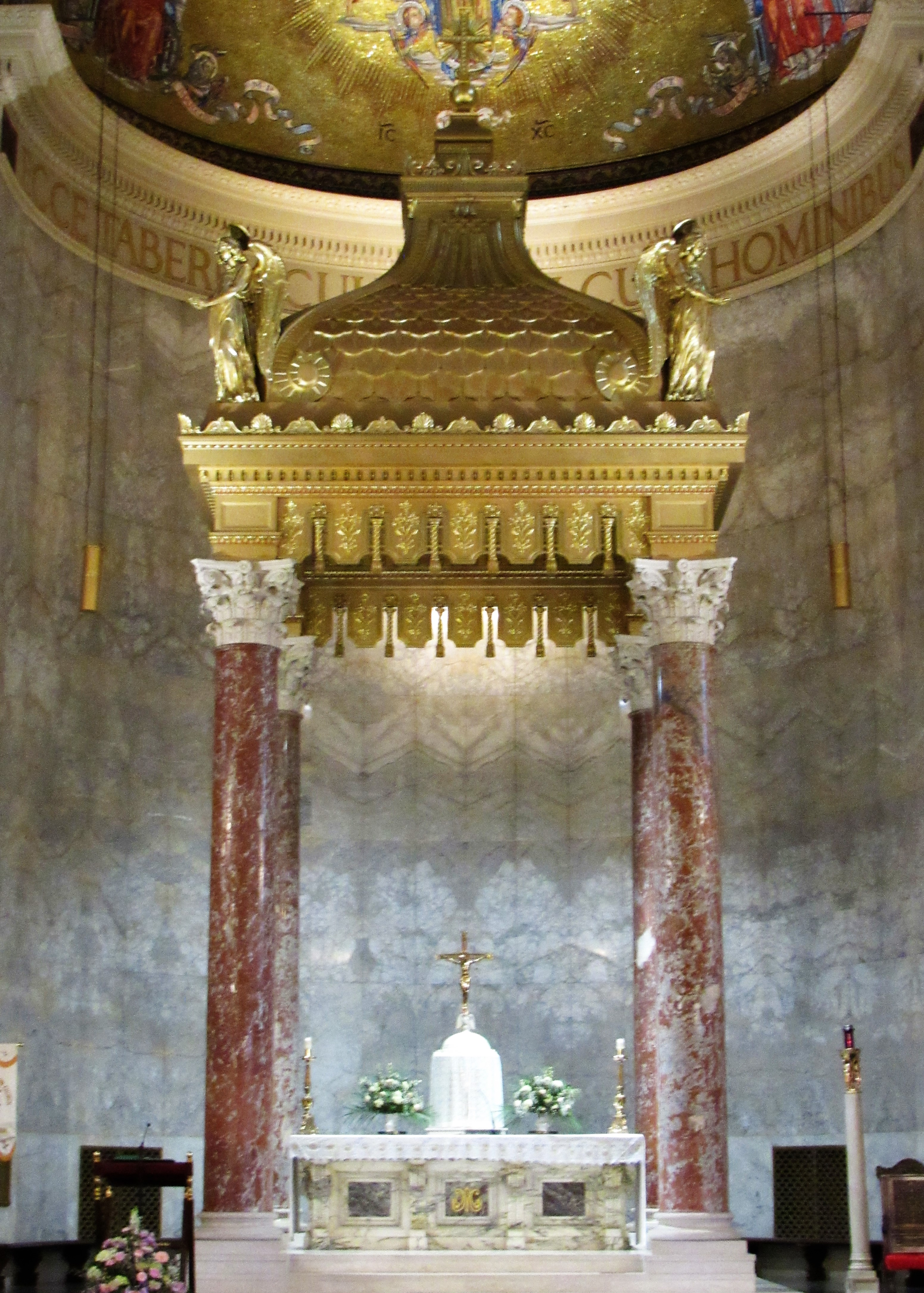
Baldachin

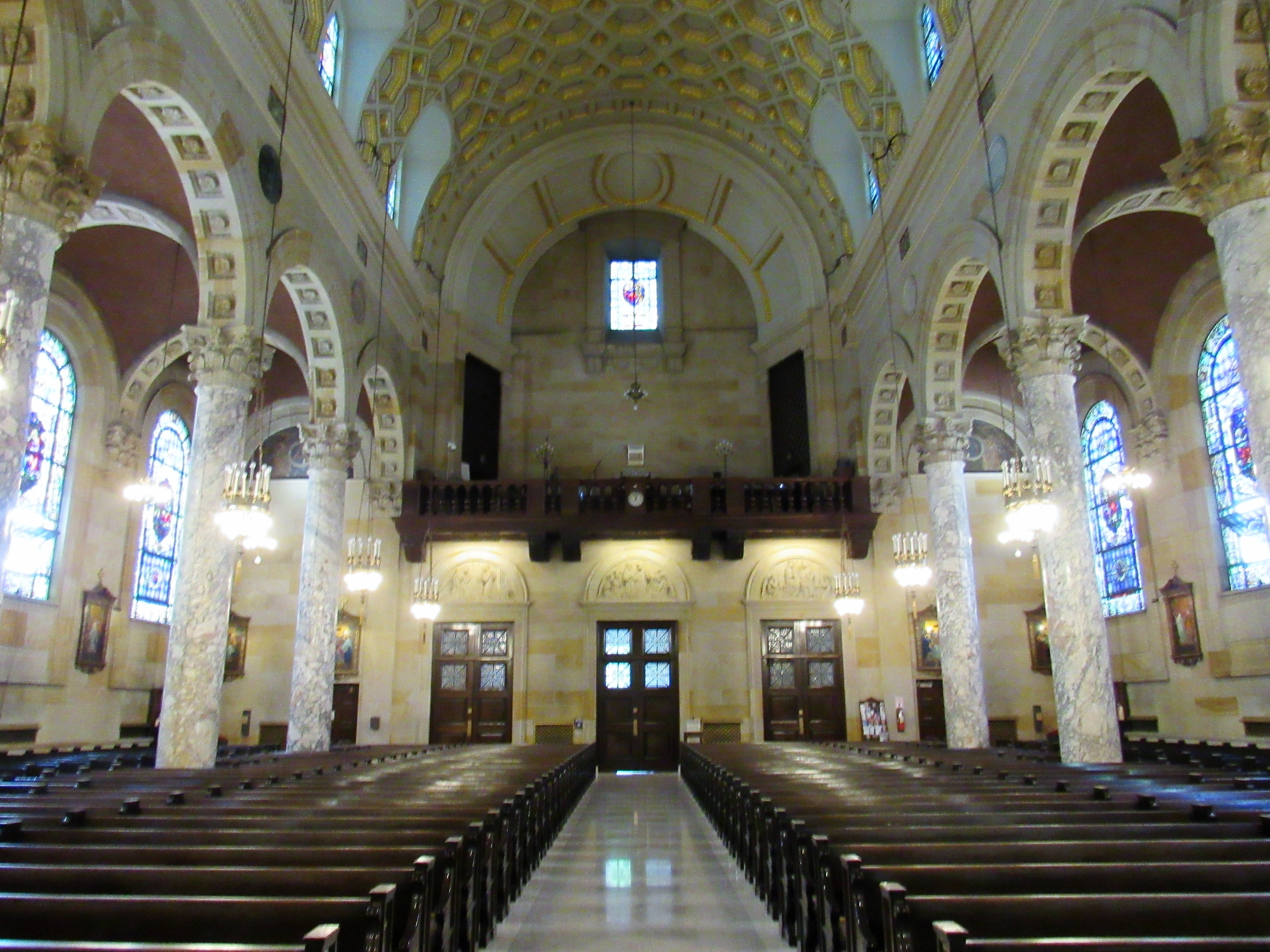
Rear gallery

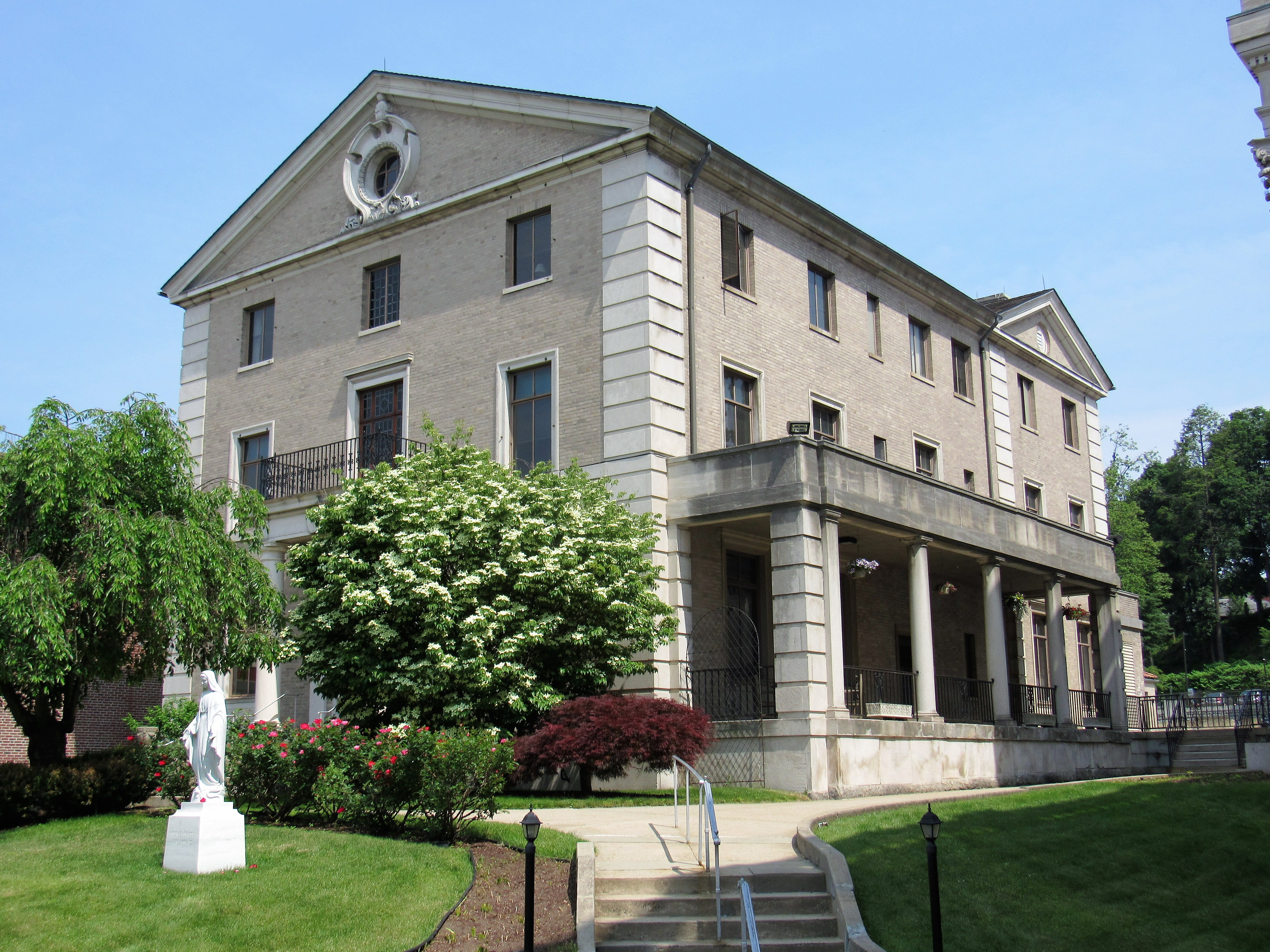
Rectory
