= William B. Colleary =

American architect

- Born: September 26, 1890; Boston, Massachusetts, U.S.
- Died: August 18, 1973 (aged 82)
- Education: College of the Holy Cross (BS); Massachusetts Institute of Technology (MS)
- Occupation: Architect

William B. Colleary, AIA, (September 26, 1890 – August 18, 1973) was an American architect active in the first half of the twentieth century. He practiced in Boston, Massachusetts, and was a partner in the architectural firm of Sheehan & Colleary and later William B. Colleary, both of which were responsible for the design of many Roman Catholic Church churches, schools, rectories, and convents.

== Early life and education ==
Colleary was born in 1890 in Boston, Massachusetts. He grew up in the Forest Hills section of Boston. He graduated from the College of the Holy Cross in Worcester, Massachusetts, with a Bachelor of Arts in 1913. He then earned a Master of Science from the Massachusetts Institute of Technology (MIT) in 1917.

== Early career ==
During his time at MIT, he was briefly employed by the firm of Maginnis and Walsh. While there, he earned several awards including a prize from the Boston Society of Architects and the gold medal from the Societe des Architectes Diplomes par le Gouvernement Francais.

Colleary served as an ensign in the United States Navy during World War 1.

== Architectural practice ==
In 1920, he entered into a partnership with T. Edward Sheehan, which was known as Sheehan and Colleary. After Sheehan's death Colleary continued to practice under his own name.

== Works ==
- St. Ann Church, Quincy, MA
- St. Michael Church, North Andover, MA
- St. James Church, Arlington, MA
- St. Catherine Church, Westford, MA
- St. Mary Church, Wrentham, MA
- St. James Church, Groton, MA
- St. Joseph Church, Portland, ME
- St. Mary Church, Randolph, MA (basement only, superstructure completed by another architect)
- Rectory of St. John the Evangelist Church, Cambridge, MA

== Works attributed to Colleary ==
- Our Lady of Perpetual Help Church, Bradford, VT
