= St. John the Evangelist Church (Cambridge, Massachusetts) =

Catholic church in Massachusetts, US

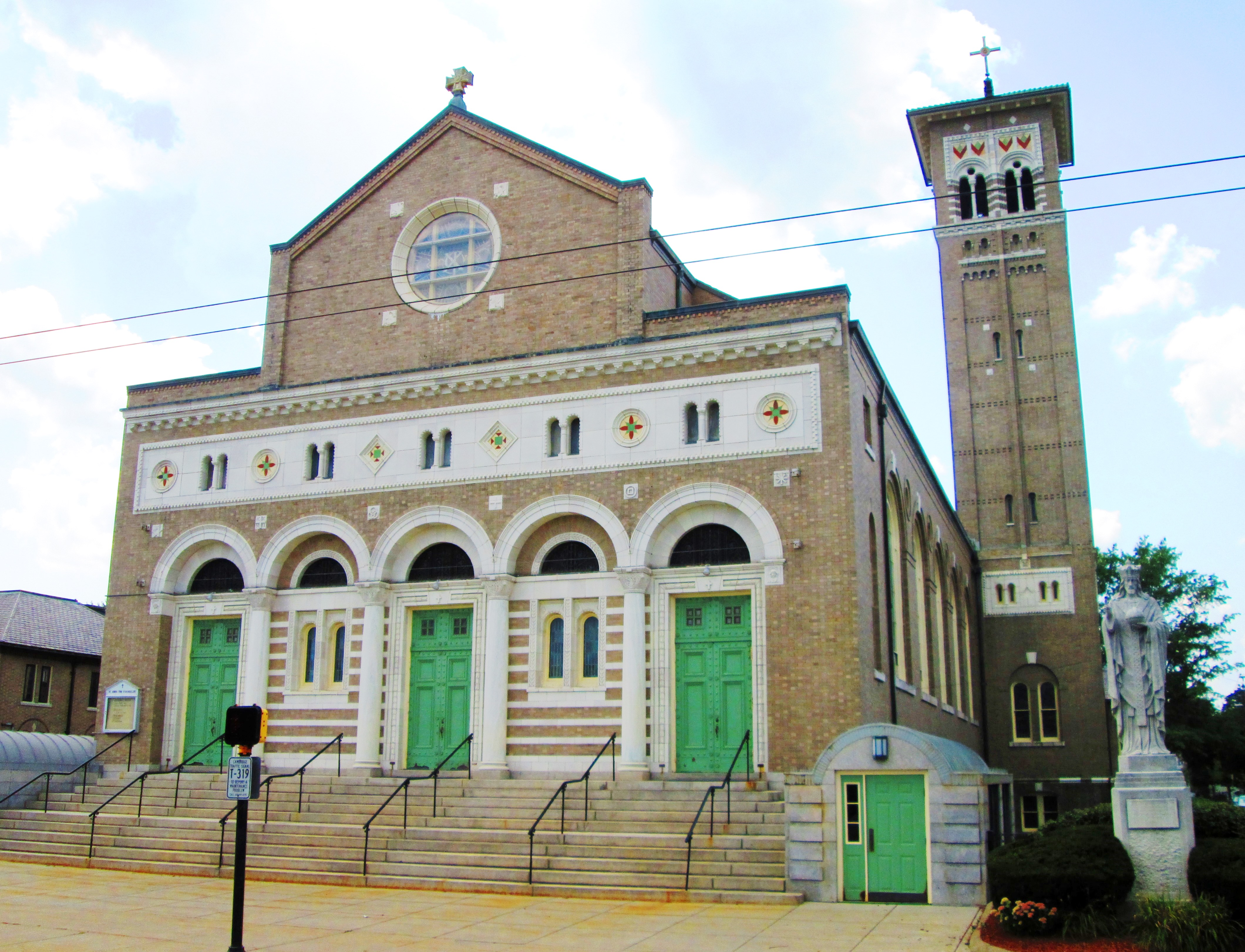
- (2017)

- Location within Massachusetts
- 42°23′40″N 71°7′38″W
- Location: 2254 Massachusetts Ave; Cambridge, Massachusetts
- Country: United States
- Denomination: Catholic Church
- Sui iuris church: Latin Church
- Website: www.stjohncambridge.org

History
- Status: Parish church
- Founded: Parish split from St. Peter's: January 1, 1893

Architecture
- Functional status: Active
- Heritage designation: NRHP
- Designated: 1983
- Architect: Maginnis, Walsh and Sullivan
- Style: Romanesque Revival
- Groundbreaking: November 30, 1904
- Completed: Early 1905

Administration
- Archdiocese: Boston

Clergy
- Pastor: Fr. Joseph T. MacCarthy
- St. John the Evangelist Church
- U.S. National Register of Historic Places
- Built: 1904
- MPS: Cambridge MRA
- NRHP reference No.: 83000829
- Added to NRHP: June 30, 1983

St. John the Evangelist is a historic Catholic Church at 2270 Massachusetts Avenue in Cambridge, Massachusetts, United States.

Tip O'Neill, who served as Speaker of the United States House of Representatives, was a lifelong parishioner and graduated from St. John High School in 1931. His Requiem Mass was held in the church on January 10, 1994.

The church was built in 1904 and added to the National Register of Historic Places in 1983. The architects, Maginnis, Walsh and Sullivan, won four gold medals from the American Institute of Architects. One was for St. John's.

== History ==
Until the early 1890s North Cambridge and West Somerville were part of Saint Peter's parish. Members from this section of the parish would travel long distances to attend Mass on Sunday. Because of rapidly growing industries and the growing number of immigrants, Father Flately, the pastor of St. Peter's Parish, worried that the young children would not get a proper Catholic education. In 1890, he purchased an acre of land on Spruce Street (now Rindge Avenue). On January 1, 1893, St. John's Parish became an independent parish and worshiped in a small wooden chapel on Rindge Avenue.

In 1898 the estate of the late Horatio Locke, on the corner of Massachusetts Avenue and Hollis Street, was purchased for $18,000 as the site for the new church. The Locke house was moved to 8 Hollis Street and became the second rectory. In 1930 the third and present rectory was built of yellow brick at 2254 Massachusetts Avenue, on the site of the Woodbridge House, in Prance (Dutch) School Style with Moorish windows. Architect was William B. Colleary; builder was Walsh Brothers. The old rectory at 8 Hollis Street was razed. A monstrance made of gold, silver, diamonds and other precious stones, donated by parishioners, was used for a Holy Hour to begin the Holy Year in 1933. It was reputed to be the largest monstrance in the United States.

== Architecture ==
Work for the new church began on November 30, 1904, with Maginnis, Walsh & Sullivan as architects and Stephen Brennan as builder. Charles Donagh Maginnis was a disciple of Ralph Adams Cram, himself a disciple of H. H. Richardson, who designed Trinity Church, Boston. The building permit issued by the city describes the construction as brick, stone and iron. The cornerstone was laid in 1905. The first Mass was celebrated in the church on April 7, 1912 (Easter Sunday). On November 1, 1912 (All Saint's Day), the church was dedicated by Cardinal O'Connell. The church, although largely built by Irish immigrants, was modeled after the 12th century Lombardo-Romanesque basilica and is very similar to Basilica di San Zeno in Verona, Italy.

=== Interior and stained glass windows ===
The cream colored limestone and marble, reflective of Italian architecture of the Middle Ages, introduces color into the construction. Using Italian Gothic design of both round and pointed arches simultaneously, the pointed arches were used more for ornamentation. The same basic construction is found in the temples of Greece and Rome and was later used in Christian churches. The stained glass windows in the side walls imitate the subdued colors in the windows of sun-drenched Italy rather than those in France and Germany, where the days are darker. The beautiful high altar sits under a gorgeous stained glass window depicting the Crucifixion. The side altar on the Epistle side is dedicated to the Sacred heart of Jesus. The other side is dedicated to the Blessed Virgin Mary.

=== Campanile, rose window and bells ===
The most outstanding feature of the church is the Campanile, or bell tower. Set well back from the facade and contiguous with the outside wall of the church, it stands free and does not compromise the facade. The Byzantine design of the top of the tower is reminiscent of the churches of the Ravenna region of Italy. An unusual feature of that style was to set the tower towards the rear of the building rather than the front. The bells ring on each quarter-hour and toll the hour, ringing the Westminster Chimes. The front approach has a broad flight of stone stairs extending the entire width of the building. The lower portion of the facade was treated as an arcade of five arches, supported by marble columns with Ionic capitals. Above the five arches a broad frieze, a band of terra cotta trim crowns the arcade. Above the frieze is a rose window, an exact replica of a church window in Toscanella, Italy. This "Wheel of fortune" represents unending life and imitates the sun. On the very peak of the facade was a statue of John the Evangelist.

=== Fire and rebuilding ===
On December 7, 1956, the church suffered a devastating fire. The Fitzgerald School's auditorium on Rindge Avenue was used as a temporary chapel. The roof caved in and fell into the nave of the upper church, as did the choir loft. The side windows were saved, but were removed during rebuilding. Much of the upper church was razed in February 1957. In April of that year rebuilding began. The main altar was completely rebuilt, although the original steps into the sanctuary were salvaged. The altar rail and pulpit were all left intact. Due to lack of funding the clerestory, its upper windows and catwalk were eliminated, as was the statue of St. John. The rose window was replaced by a smaller one. On the arch above the high altar are the words: "And the word was made flesh and came to dwell among us" from the Prologue of the Gospel of John.

=== Mid-1990s renovation and liturgical update ===
In 1996 a fund drive began to renovate and update the church. In addition to much needed repairs and upgrades the church underwent a Liturgical update. The marble high altar was moved forward from the under the baldacchino, allowing it to be used for the first time in many years due to changes made to the Mass by the Second Vatican Council. The altar rail was removed to give the sanctuary a more open and inviting feel. The pulpit was taken down and fashioned into a new ambo. Much of the marble was used elsewhere in the church; parts of the altar rail and pulpit were made into a new baptismal font. Two statues, one of St. John The Evangelist, the other of Saint Joseph, that had been placed in the sanctuary during the rebuilding were removed, painted and placed by the front entrances of the church. The two side altars were also painted emphasizing their beauty. The church's tabernacle, which had been placed on the altar of the Sacred Heart during the rebuilding, was restored to its original grandeur. During the renovation, the church was made handicapped accessible. The newly renovated and updated church was dedicated by Cardinal Bernard F. Law on December 27, 1998, the feast of St. John The Evangelist.

== Masses ==
Mass Schedule: Saturday Vigil – 4:00 p.m., Sunday 9:00 & 11:00 a.m. (and 4:30 p.m. in Creole). Daily Mass: Monday—Wednesday 12:10 p.m, Friday Communion Service 7:00 AM Holy Days of Obligation, as announced.

== Gallery ==
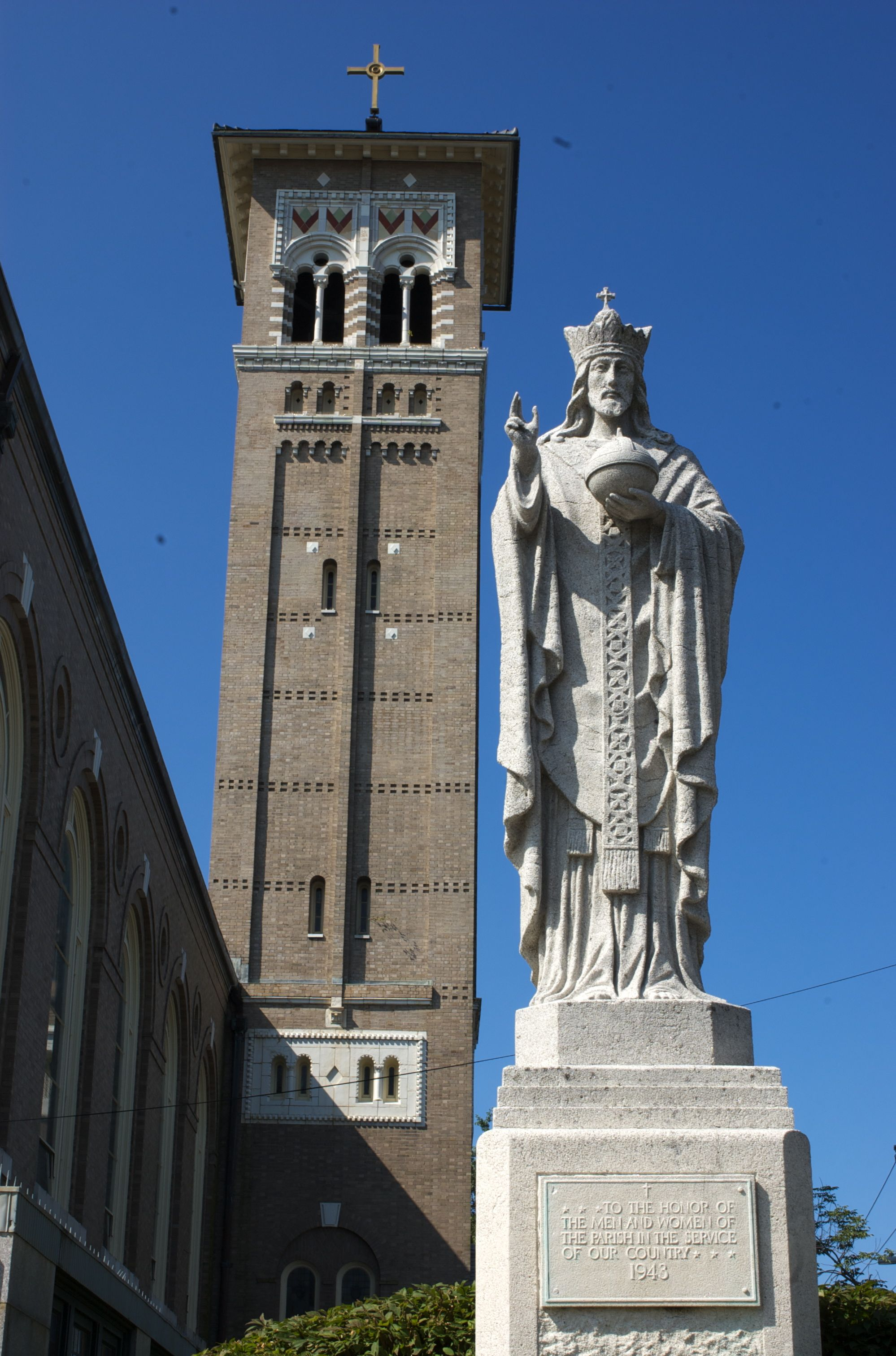
Statue of Christ the King in front of the church

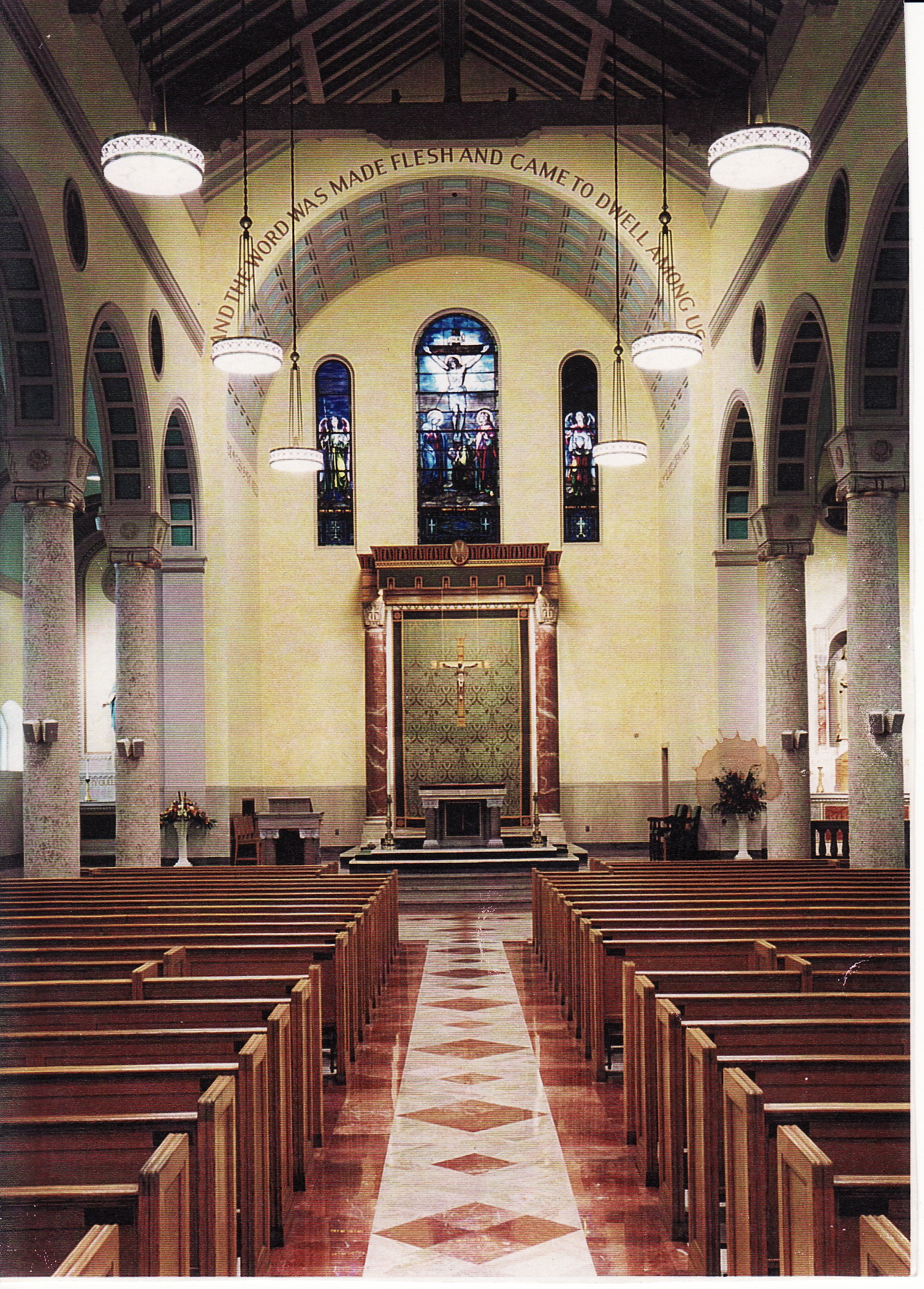
Church interior

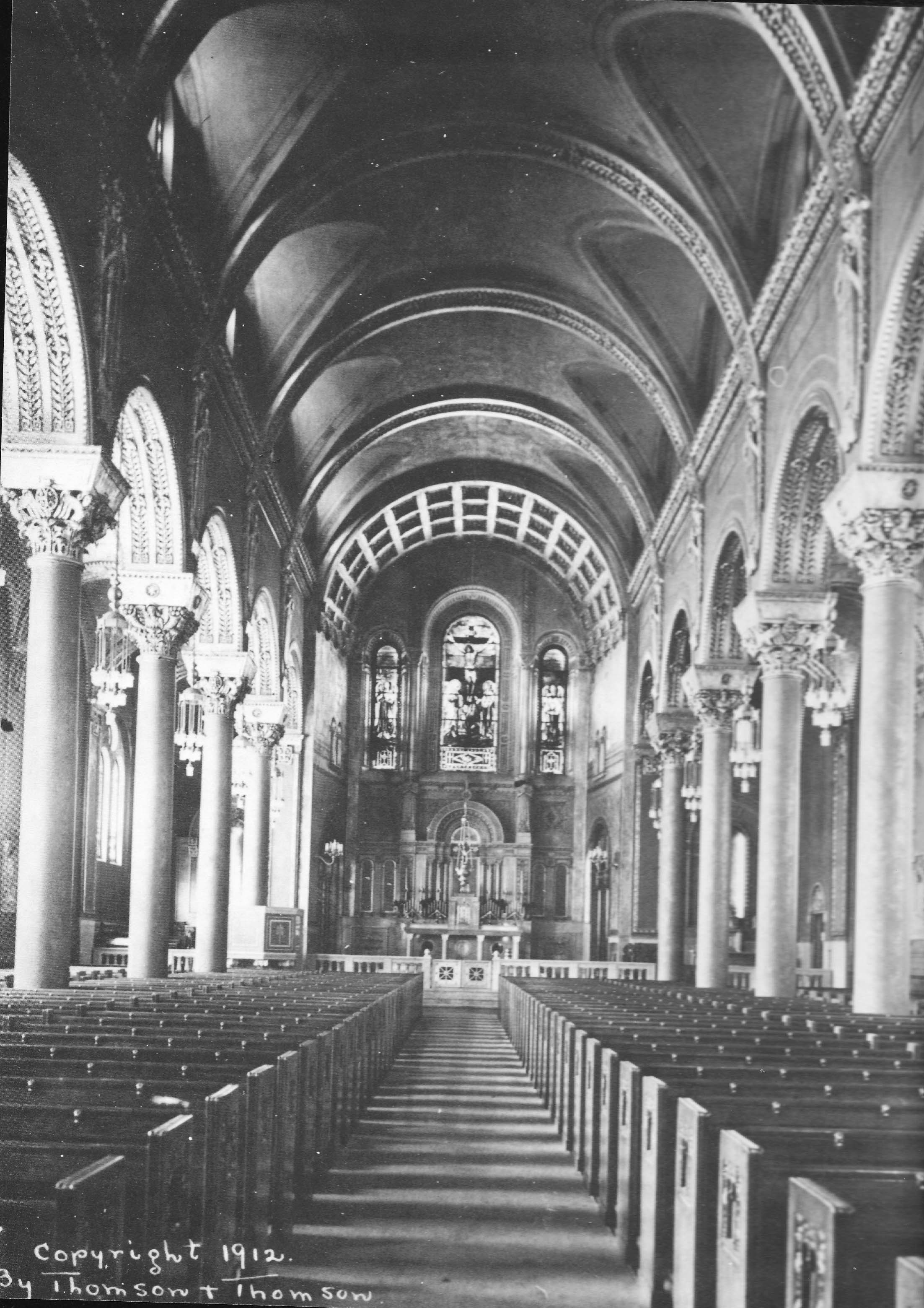
Interior prior to the 1956 fire
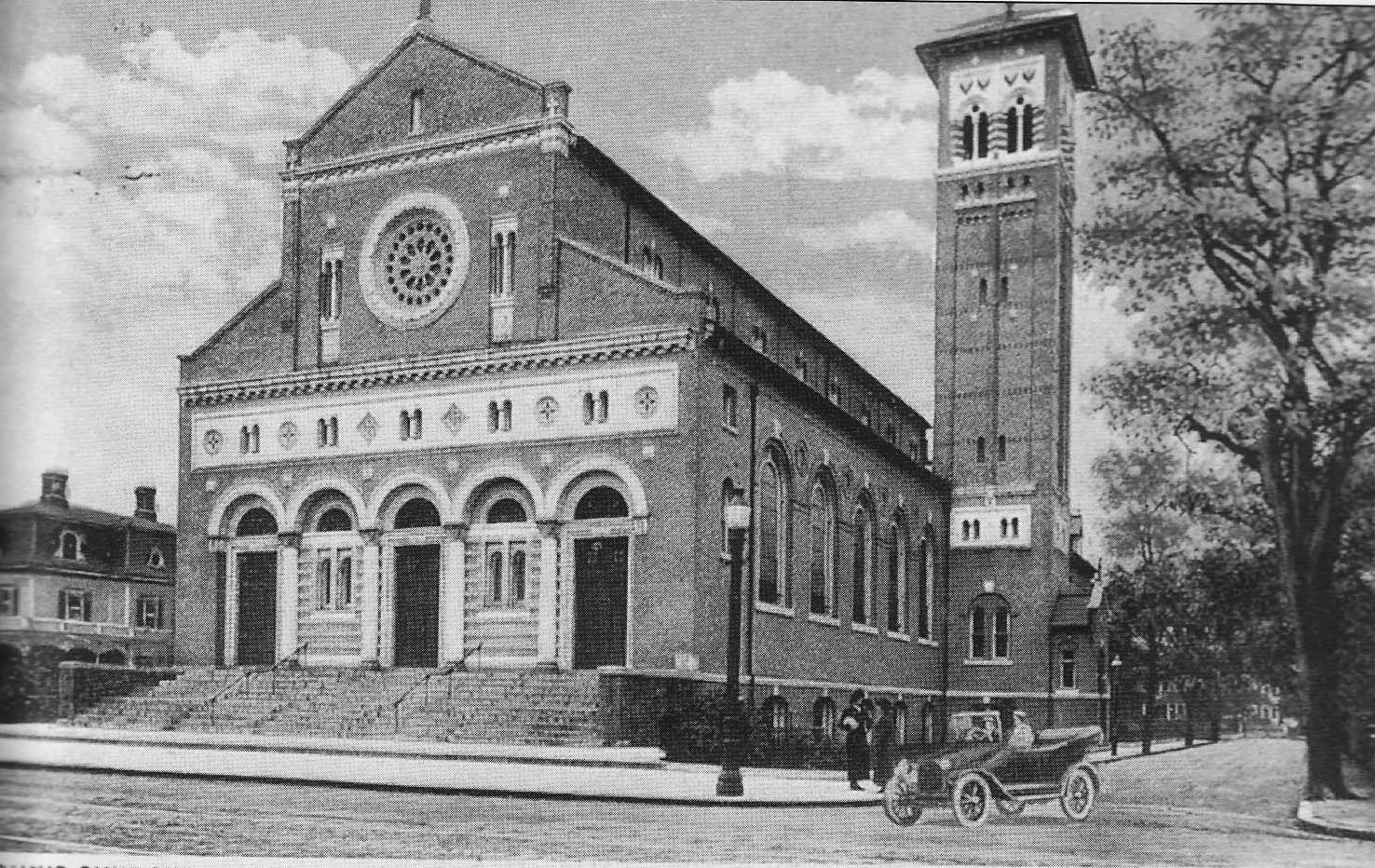
St. John the Evangelist Church as it looked when first built

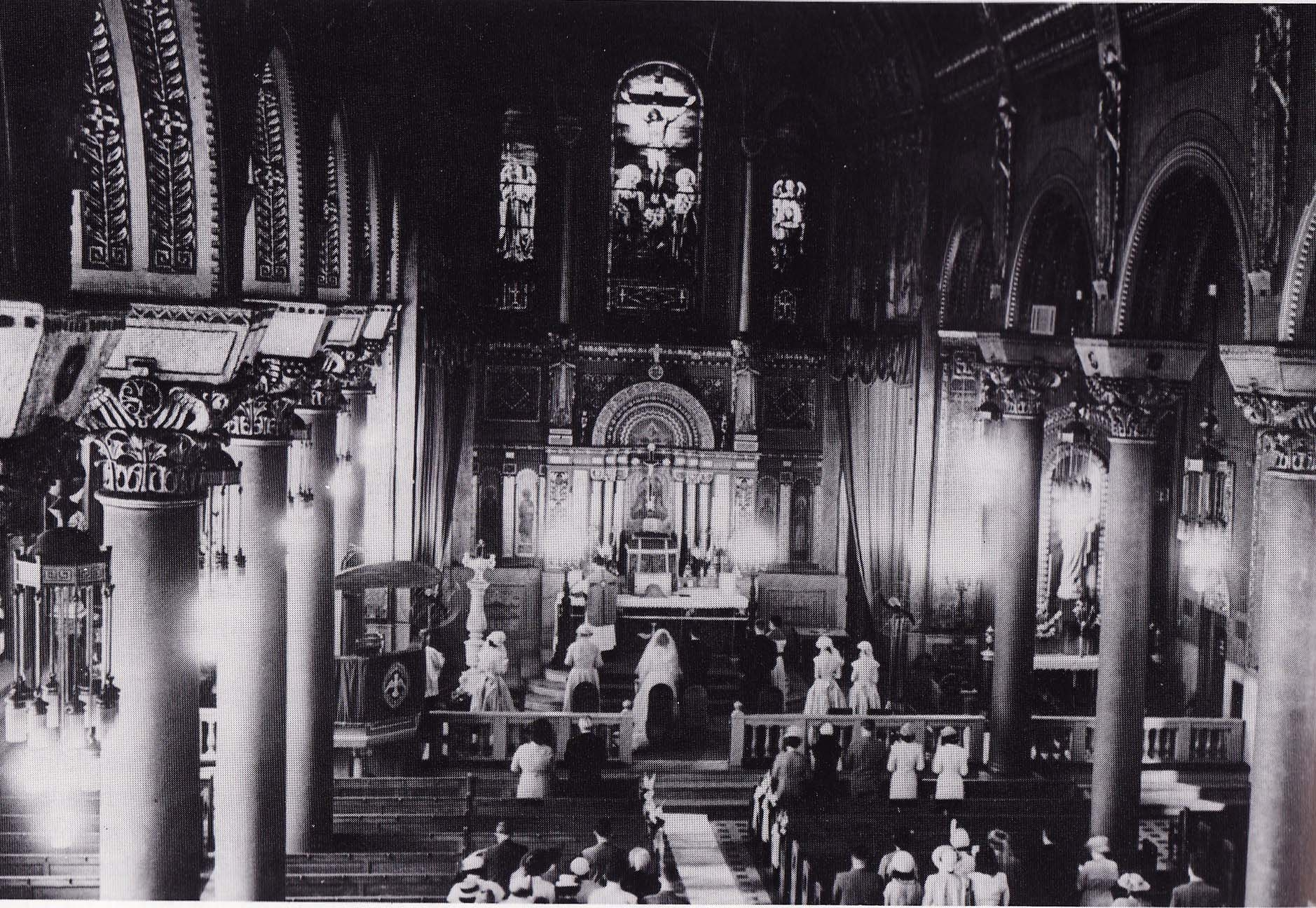
A nuptial Mass

== See also ==
- Charles Donagh Maginnis
- Roman Catholic Archdiocese of Boston
- National Register of Historic Places listings in Cambridge, Massachusetts
