= Maginnis, Walsh and Sullivan =

American architecture firm

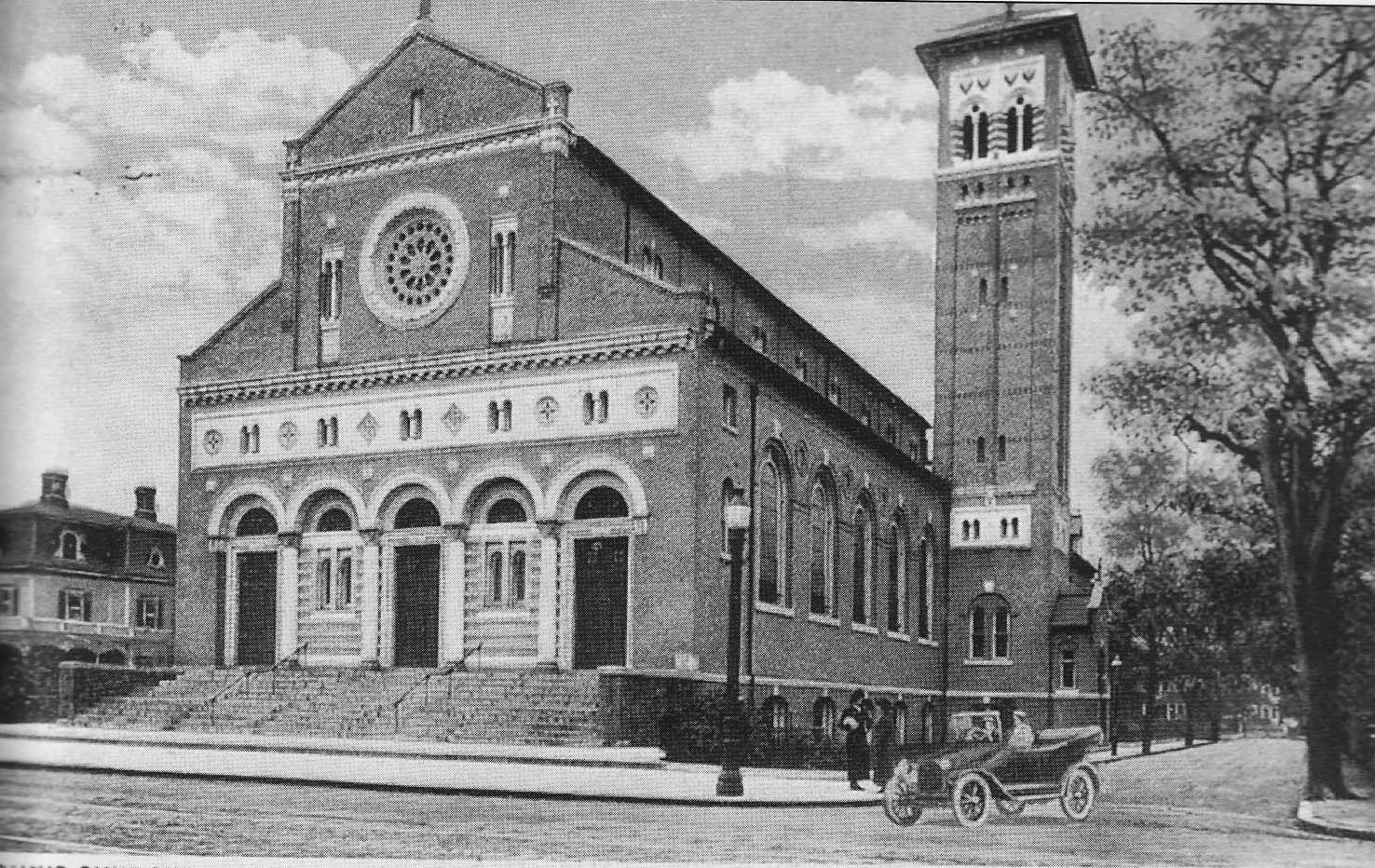
St. John the Evangelist Church, Cambridge, Massachusetts, 1905

Maginnis, Walsh and Sullivan, an American architecture firm active from its founding in 1898 to its dissolution in 1905.

The principals were Charles Donagh Maginnis (1867-1955), Timothy Francis Walsh (1868-1934), and Matthew Sullivan (1868-1948). Sullivan left the firm in 1905 for solo practice; the other two continued as Maginnis & Walsh for decades.

Work at:

- St. Patrick's Roman Catholic Church, Whitinsville, Massachusetts, 1898
- St. John the Evangelist Church, Cambridge, Massachusetts, 1905
- St. Thomas the Apostle Catholic Church, Los Angeles, California, 1905
- school at St. Mary's Complex, Taunton, Massachusetts, 1907
- Huntington Avenue building, Girls' Latin School, Boston, Massachusetts, with architects Peabody & Stearns and Coolidge & Carlson, completed 1907
