= All Saints Catholic Church (Stuart, Iowa) =

- U.S. National Register of Historic Places
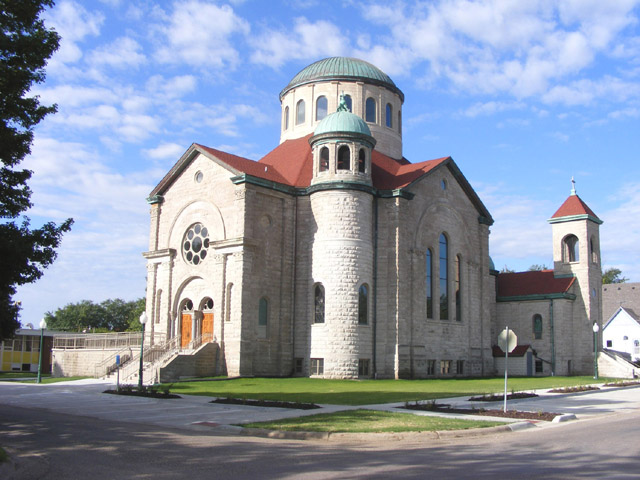
- The reconstructed church in 2010

- Location within Iowa Location within the United States
- Location: 320 N. Fremont; Stuart, Iowa
- Coordinates: 41°30′25″N 94°19′2″W
- Built: 1908-1910
- Architect: Maginnis and Walsh
- Architectural style: Late 19th And 20th Century Revivals
- NRHP reference No.: 00001478
- Added to NRHP: December 7, 2000

All Saints Catholic Church is a parish church building in the Diocese of Des Moines. The building is located in Stuart, Iowa, United States. The parish used the building as its church until a devastating fire severely damaged the structure. The church was rebuilt and it now serves as a cultural center called the Historic All Saints/Saints Center for Culture and the Arts. It is listed on the National Register of Historic Places, and is a rare example of Neo-Byzantine architecture in the state of Iowa.

== History ==
=== Development ===
The Catholic Church in Stuart traces its beginnings to August 1871 when a Father Moniahan from Des Moines came to town for the first time to celebrate Mass. He would come at irregular intervals and Mass was celebrated in school rooms, Shield's Hall, and in private homes. At this time the whole state of Iowa was part of the Diocese of Dubuque.

The first church was built in 1874 under the direction of the Rev. Edward Gaul. It was dedicated by the Very Rev. J.F. Brazil from St. Ambrose in Des Moines on the Feast of All Saints, November 1, 1877. The Rev. James Foley was pastor at the time and he built two additions onto the church as well as the rectory during his 24 years at All Saints. During that time he was also responsible for parishes in Casey, Adair, Guthrie Center and Greenfield. The parish became a part of the Diocese of Davenport when it was established in 1881.

=== Historic Church ===
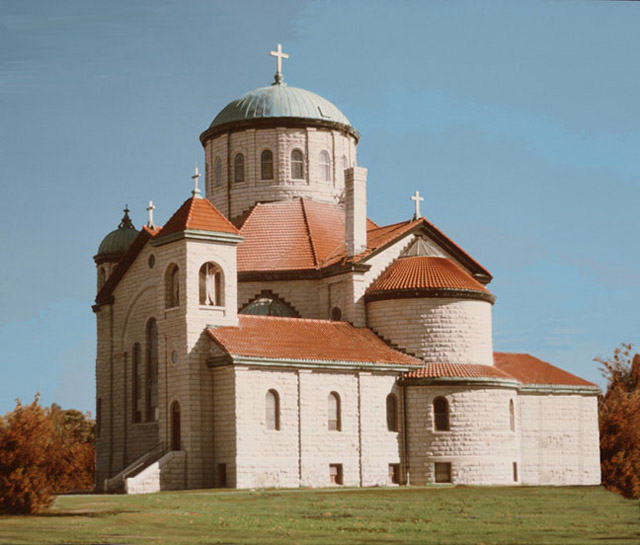
The church before the 1995 fire.

On October 12, 1902, the Rev. M.S. McNamara became pastor. It was during his pastorate that plans for a new church were developed and executed. Maginnis and Walsh were responsible for designing the church. The cornerstone was laid in September 1908 and it was completed in 1910. It was built of blue Bedford limestone in a combination of Byzantine Revival and Romanesque Revival styles. The building measures 70 feet (21 m) wide, 120 feet (37 m) long and 110 feet (34 m) high. It has a seating capacity of 600. The interior is under an 90-foot (27 m) high dome that contains 16 windows. The dome was covered in copper. The church was decorated with Italian marble, rare woods, hand painted frescos, gold gilding, and statuary. The windows were from the Franz Mayer & Co. of Munich, Germany. The church was built for $65,000.

Bishop James Davis of Davenport dedicated the church at a Pontifical High Mass. Bishop James J. Keane of Cheyenne, Wyoming, preached the sermon. The following year the parish became part of the Diocese of Des Moines when it was established in 1911 on the same day that Bishop Keane was named Archbishop of Dubuque.

=== Fire and aftermath ===
On August 22, 1995, Charles Willard of Des Moines drove to Stuart and poured gasoline in various places in the church and set it on fire. Fire departments from 20 area communities in a 50-mile (80 km) radius of Stuart fought the fire. While the exterior walls remained standing the rest of the building lay in ruins. A small chapel in the back suffered minor damage. Willard had mailed letters to two bishops and a Des Moines television station before he set the fire taking responsibility based on his hatred of the Catholic Church. He even held a news conference before his arrest. He was convicted of arson and a hate crime.

The parish, under the leadership of the Rev. Dan Clarke, and the diocese decided that to rebuild the church would be too expensive. Instead they decided to build a new facility on 95 acres (380,000 m^{2}) of land purchased from the Bill and Marlene Wilson family for $475,000. The new church, designed by the RDG Planning & Design of Omaha, has seating for 400 people and a parking lot for 175 cars. The cost for the new church was $2.5 million. Bishop Joseph Charron, C.Pp.S. laid the cornerstone for the new church on August 31, 1997.

In September 1997 the damaged historic church building and property were sold to a group named the Project Restore Foundation for $7,200. They had hoped to rehabilitate the building in three years for a community cultural center at an estimated cost of around $3.5 million. The architects for the restoration project were Kirk Blunck and Jeff Wagner of HLKB in Des Moines and construction was done by Koester in Grimes. Plans called for the exterior of the old church to look similar to the way it looked before the fire. The interior would have a modern appearance with exposed stone and brick on the walls. The dome would be rebuilt with the original stone, which had been numbered and saved. The original copper on the dome melted so it was replaced with new copper sheeting.

Several grants helped with the restoration effort. In 2000 the State Historical Society of Iowa Board of Trustees approved a grant for $60,000 towards the project. In 2007 Project Restore received a $545,000 grant from Vision Iowa, a state program that provides money for major tourism attractions. That same year 63% of the citizens of Stuart voted to accept a $1.7 million bond referendum to rebuild the church. Another $232,000 (as of 2007) in private donations was also raised,

A small chapel on the west side of the church and the former sacristy was the first part of the project that was finished in 2002–2003. A group of Serbian Orthodox Christians started using the chapel for a monthly liturgy in 2005. The new dome was lifted into place in October 2008. Work on the interior continued after that and was completed in 2010.
