= Bapst Library =

Academic library in Boston

Coordinates: 42°20′12.1″N 71°10′16.8″W

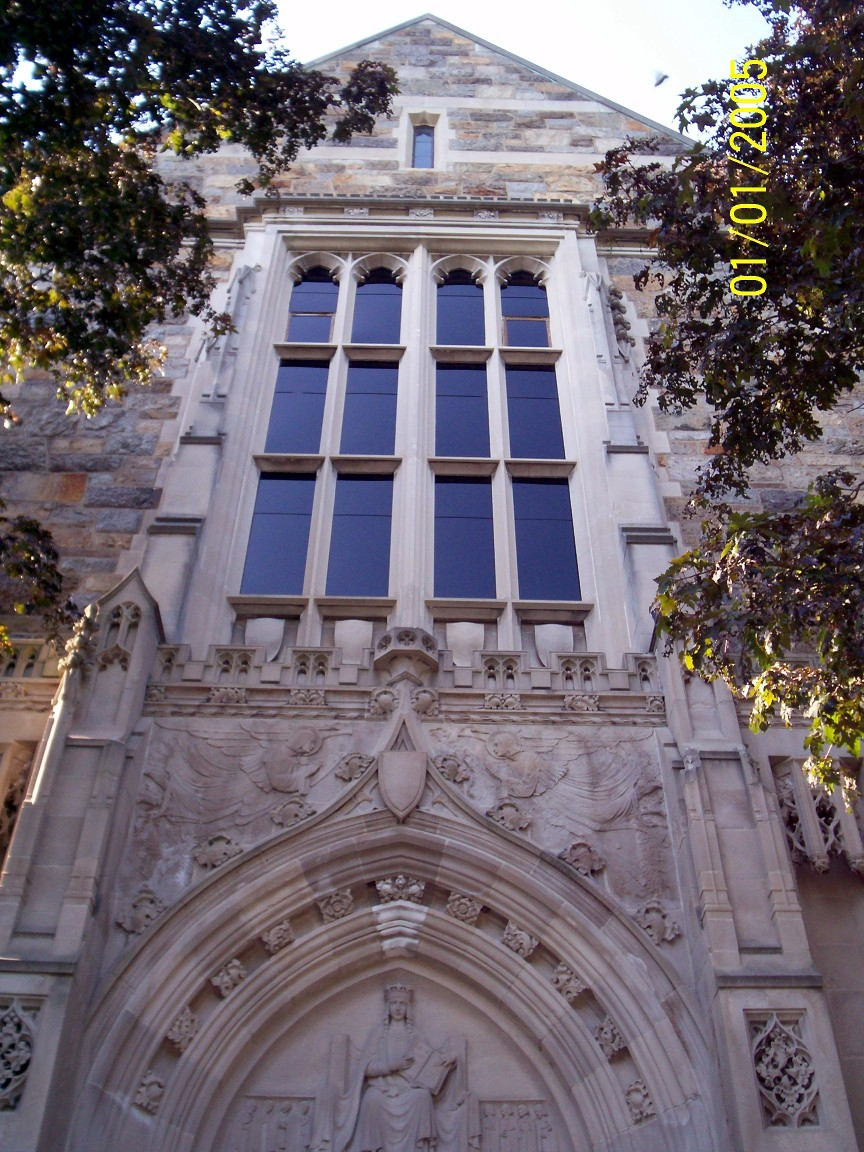
- Location: 140 Commonwealth Ave Chestnut Hill, Massachusetts, United States
- Type: Academic
- Established: 1924
- Branch of: Boston College

Collection
- Items collected: Art, architecture, museum studies, and photography
- Size: 51,000

Other information
- Website: libguides.bc.edu/bapst

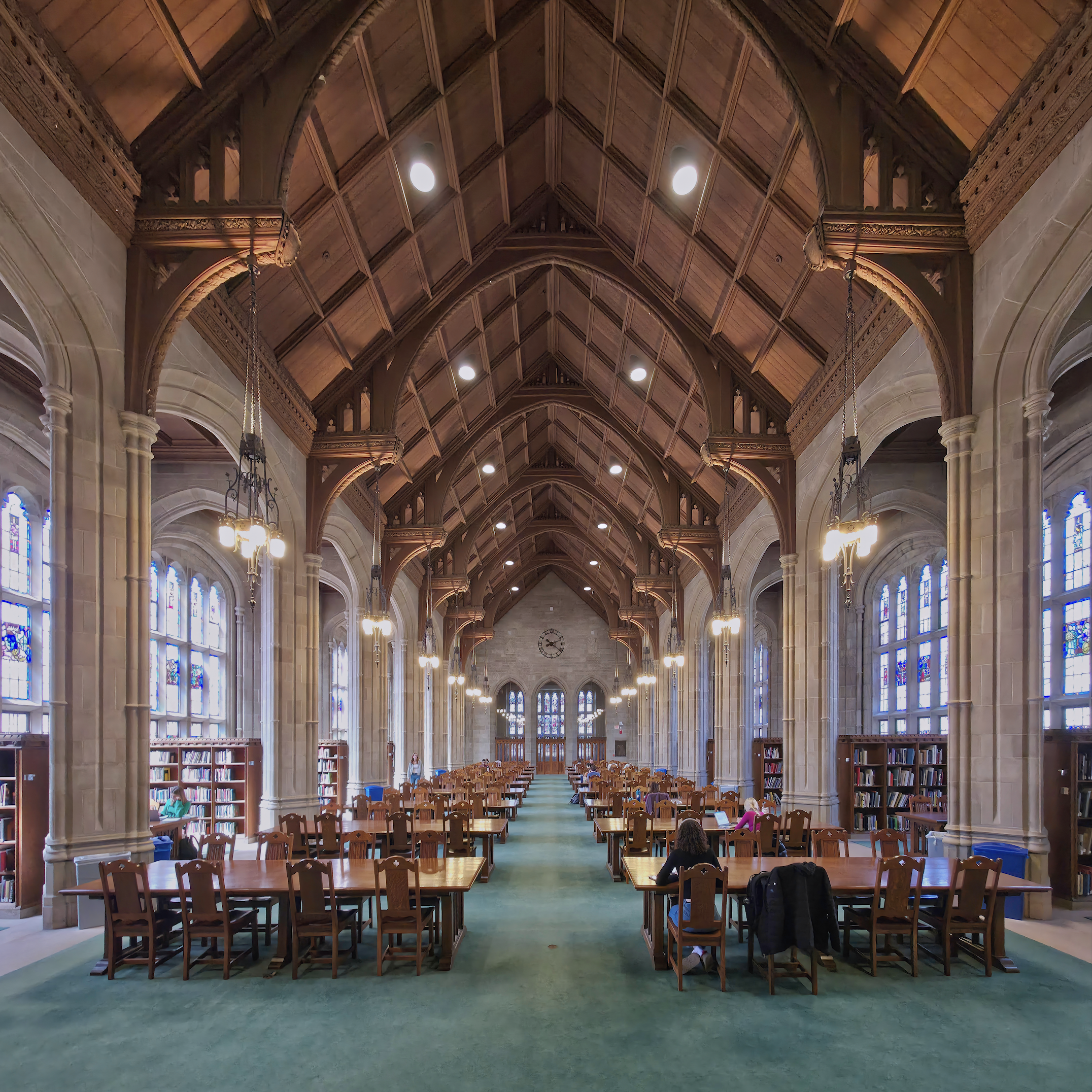
Gargan Hall at Bapst Library

The Bapst Library is a Boston College library located on the college's Chestnut Hill campus. The Bapst Library served as the original Boston College Library from 1925 until the opening of the Thomas P. O'Neill Library in 1984. The Bapst Library is named after the first Boston College president Rev. John Bapst. The library contains over 51,000 volumes relating to Art. Before the closing of the student art gallery, Bapst Library often had student exhibits that include artwork throughout the year. The most recent one, the Art Club Student Spring Show, lasted from March 28 to April 20, 2012.
