= St. Mary's Complex (Taunton, Massachusetts) =

Historic church in Massachusetts, United States

- U.S. National Register of Historic Places
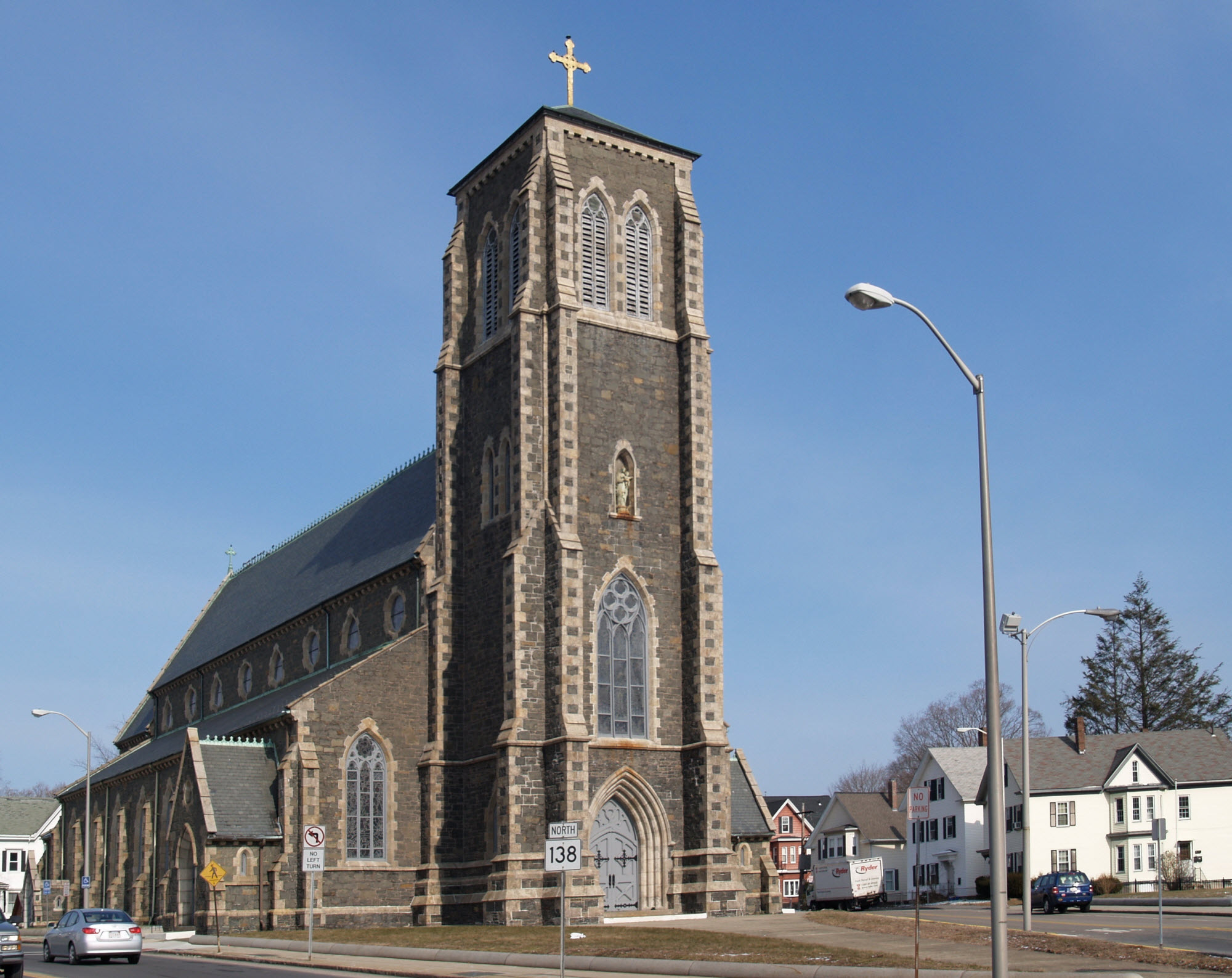

- Location within Massachusetts Location within the United States
- Location: Taunton, Massachusetts
- Coordinates: 41°54′27″N 71°5′39″W
- Area: 7 acres (2.8 ha)
- Built: 1868
- Architect: Patrick C. Keely; Maginnis, Walsh and Sullivan
- Architectural style: Late Gothic Revival
- MPS: Taunton MRA
- NRHP reference No.: 84002211
- Added to NRHP: July 5, 1984

St. Mary's Complex is a historic Roman Catholic Church complex at Broadway and Washington Street in Taunton, Massachusetts. The parish, the first in Taunton, was established in 1830, and the present church, its third, was built in 1868, to a design by Patrick C. Keely. The complex, also including a rectory, convent, and school, was listed on the National Register of Historic Places in 1984.

== Description and history ==
St. Mary's Church is located on a triangular parcel at the northern corner of Washington Street and Broadway, a short way north of Taunton's downtown area. It is a massive Gothic Revival structure executed in stone, with a square tower at the front. The tower and the building sides are buttressed, with quoined corners. The main sanctuary has a gable roof with a clerestory level. The church was designed by Patrick Keely and completed in 1868; it is the parish's third church building.

Across Washington Street to the east is the rectory, a Flemish Revival brick building constructed in 1903 on the site of the first church, which was sold and moved elsewhere in Taunton. On the west side of the intersection stand the other two buildings: the school, a three-story brick building in Collegiate Gothic style designed by Maginnis, Walsh and Sullivan and built in 1907, and the convent, a mansard-roofed three-story brick building added in 1912.

The parish was established in 1830 by Irish Catholics who had come to Taunton to work in its industries. After meeting in private homes, a wood-frame church was built where the present rectory stands in 1832. This church burned in 1856 and was promptly rebuilt. When the rectory was built, the old church was moved to East Taunton, and became known as St. Charles Hall. Taunton's other Catholic parishes are all derived from this mother congregation.

History of past Priests:

Reverend James Coyle (1896-1931)

Reverend James Dolan (1935-1969)

Reverend James Lyons (1969-1976)

Reverend Paul Connolly (1976-1999)

Reverend Francis Kowaski, C.S.C (1999-2004)

Reverend William Kelly, C.S.C (2004-2010)

Reverend James Doherty C.S.C (2010–present)

== See also ==
- National Register of Historic Places listings in Taunton, Massachusetts
