= Tillinghast (surname) =

Tillinghast is a surname. Notable people with the surname include:

- A. W. Tillinghast (1874–1942), United States golf course architect
- Charles Carpenter Tillinghast, Jr. (1911–1998), American chairman of Trans World Airlines and chancellor of Brown University
- John Tillinghast (1604–1655), British clergyman
- Mary Tillinghast (f. 1690s), British food writer
- Mary Elizabeth Tillinghast (1845–1912), American stained-glass artist
- Muriel Tillinghast, American civil rights activist
- Pardon Tillinghast (1622–1717), early American Baptist pastor and public official
- Richard Tillinghast (born 1940), United States poet
- Wallace Tillinghast (f. 1909–1910), United States man who falsely claimed to have invented a flying machine

It may also refer to a prominent Rhode Island political family, whose members include:

- Joseph L. Tillinghast (1791–1844), United States political figure from Rhode Island
- Charles Foster Tillinghast (1797–1864), American lawyer, founder of the Tillinghast Licht law firm, and grandfather of Charles Foster Tillinghast Sr.
- Thomas Tillinghast (1842–1921), United States political figure from Rhode Island
- Charles Foster Tillinghast Sr. (1871–1948), American businessman and National Guard officer
- Charles Foster Tillinghast Jr. (1913–1995), American yachtsman and naval officer, son of Charles Foster Tillinghast Sr.

== See also ==
- Justice Tillinghast (disambiguation)
