= Charles Tillinghast =

Charles Tillinghast may refer to:

- Charles Foster Tillinghast Sr. (1871-1948), American businessman and National Guard officer
- Charles Foster Tillinghast Jr. (1913-1995), American yachtsman and naval officer, son of Charles Foster Tillinghast Sr.
- Charles C. Tillinghast Jr. (1911-1998), American businessman

== See also ==
- Charles Tillinghast House, historic house in Newport, Rhode Island
- Charles Tillinghast James (1805-1857), American manufacturing engineer
