= Tillinghast =

Tillinghast may refer to:

- Tillinghast L'Hommedieu Huston (1867–1938), American businessman, owner of New York Yankees, circa 1915
- Tillinghast Mill Site, a Registered Historic Place in Rhode Island, United States
- Tillinghast Road Historic District, a Registered Historic Place in Rhode Island, United States
- Tillinghast Licht, a now defunct law firm in Rhode Island, United States
- Tillinghast, Nelson & Warren Inc., an American company that is now a part of Willis Towers Watson

== See also ==
- Tillinghast (surname), an English surname
