= Charles S. Bradley =

American judge

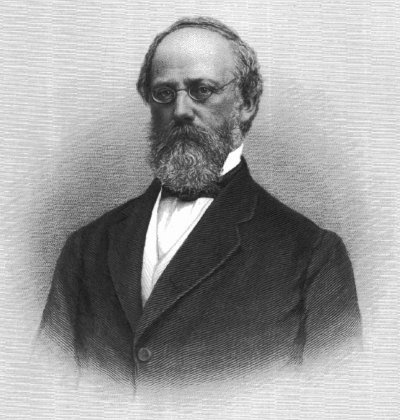
- Engraving of Charles S. Bradley

Chief Justice of Rhode Island
- In office May 1866 – 1868
- Preceded by: Samuel Ames

Personal details
- Born: Charles Smith Bradley; July 19, 1819 Newburyport, Massachusetts
- Died: April 29, 1888 (aged 68) New York City
- Spouses: Sarah Manton (m. 1842; died 1854) Charlotte Augusta Saunders (m. 1858; died 1864) Emma Pendleton Chambers (m. 1866; died 1875)
- Children: 4
- Education: Brown University; Harvard Law School
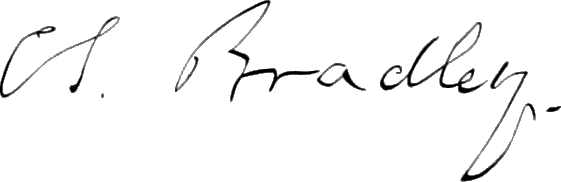
- Signature

Charles Smith Bradley (July 19, 1819 – April 29, 1888) was a lawyer and legal scholar. He served as chief justice of the Rhode Island Supreme Court between 1866 and 1868.

== Biography ==
Born on July 19, 1819, in Newburyport, Massachusetts. Bradley attended Boston Latin School and went on to Brown University at 15. He graduated in 1838 with the highest honors of his class. Choosing the legal profession, he attended Harvard Law School, and formed a business co-partnership with Charles Foster Tillinghast, Sr. on his being admitted to the bar in 1841. Their law firm, Tillinghast & Bradley, became one of the most prominent law firms in the United States in the late 19th and early 20th century.

In 1854 Bradley was elected by North Providence to the Senate of the State, where he was influential in securing the Act of Amnesty to all who were involved in the Dorr Rebellion of 1842. In February 1866, he was elected Chief-Justice of the Supreme Court of Rhode Island, and for over two years, he held that high position.

He resigned to resume professional practice and give that attention to business affairs that the exacting nature of judicial duties precluded. Bradley was chosen Bussey Professor of Law at Harvard Law School and filled the chair until 1879.

He married Sarah Manton on April 28, 1842, and they had three sons. She died on December 12, 1854. He remarried to Charlotte Augusta Saunders on August 4, 1858, and they had one son. She died in May 1864, and he married a third time to Emma Pendleton Chambers in May 1866. She died on February 28, 1875.

== Death and legacy ==
Charles S. Bradley died on April 29, 1888, in New York City.

Bradley's Providence house and properties were purchased by Providence College in 1926, and later renamed Martin Hall. The home is listed on the National Register of Historic Places.
