= Matthew Sullivan =

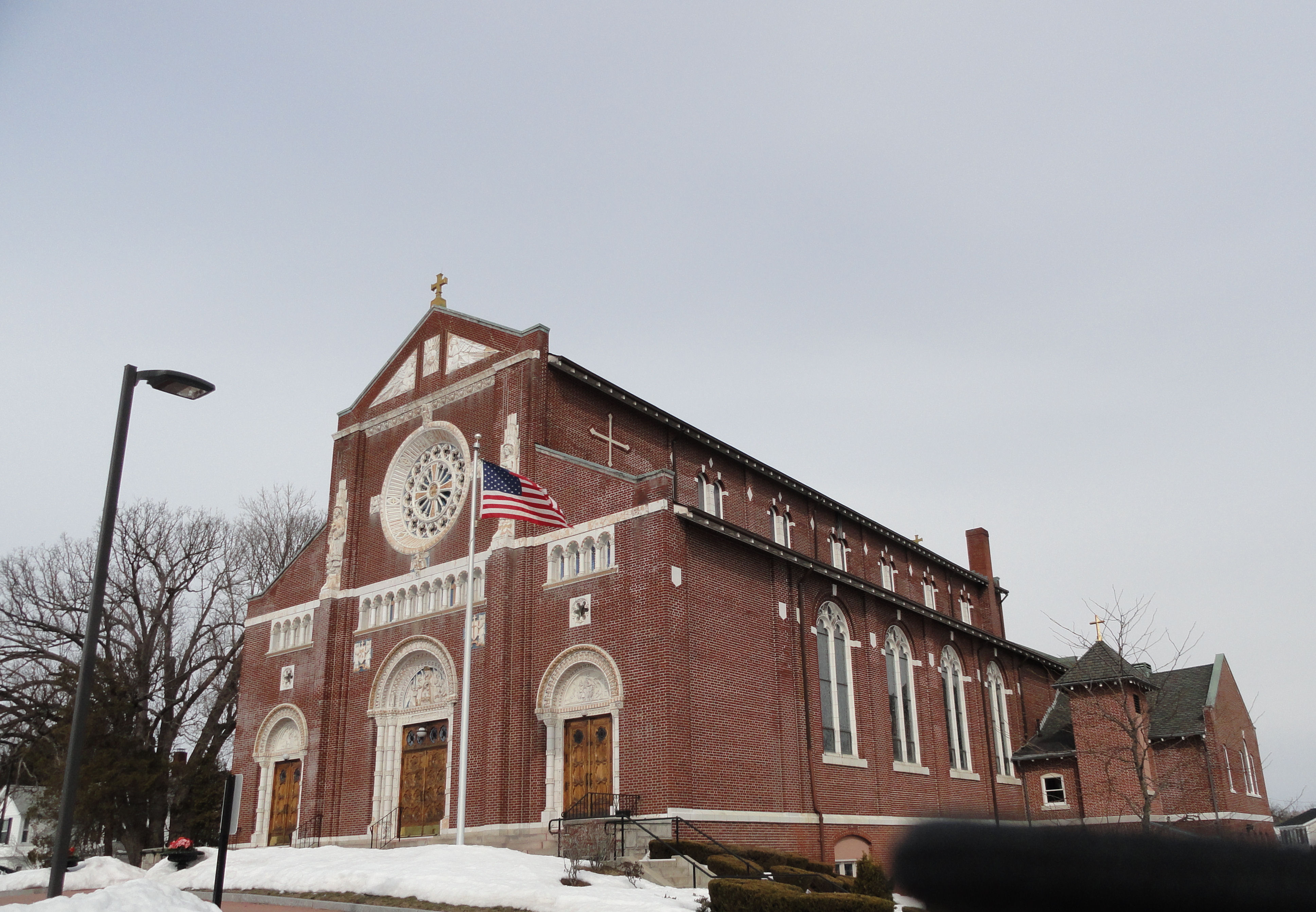
- Annunciation of The Lord Church, Taunton, Massachusetts (formerly Sacred Heart Church)
- Born: May 7, 1868; Boston, Massachusetts, U.S.
- Died: August 11, 1938 (aged 70); Boston, Massachusetts, U.S.
- Known for: Architect, poet

Matthew Sullivan (May 7, 1868 – August 11, 1938) was an American architect whose practice specialized in ecclesiastical design.

== Life and career ==
Matthew Sullivan was born May 7, 1868, in Boston to Daniel Sullivan and Mary (Deasy) Sullivan. He was educated in the Boston public schools, and as a young man worked in the office of architect Edmund M. Wheelwright. Sullivan then lived for several years in St. Louis, working for Eames & Young. In 1891, Sullivan returned to Boston and joined the office of the City Architect, then under Wheelwright's leadership. By 1893, he was Assistant City Architect under Wheelwright. In 1895, when the office of City Architect was abolished, Sullivan became head of the architect's division of the school-house department, which replaced some of the duties of the old office. In 1898, Sullivan resigned to form a partnership with architects Charles Donagh Maginnis and Timothy Walsh. This firm, Maginnis, Walsh & Sullivan, became very successful. Sullivan was involved in the design of several of Maginnis, Walsh & Sullivan's influential early works, which included the churches of St. John the Evangelist in Cambridge and St. Catherine of Genoa in Somerville.

The partnership was dissolved effective December 31, 1907. It was succeeded on January 1, 1908, by the partnership of Maginnis & Walsh and of the private practice of Sullivan. Both would maintain their offices at 100 Boylston Street. As a private practitioner Sullivan continued to focus on projects for the Catholic church. His work included parish churches and schools as well as larger projects like Harkins Hall, the main building of Providence College. Sullivan practiced architecture in Boston until his death in 1938.

Sullivan frequently utilized the services of woodcarver Johannes Kirchmayer of Irving & Casson in his designs.

== Personal life ==
Sullivan was married to Kathrine Louise Lally, and they had four children: Mary Sullivan (1899–1985), Katharine Sullivan (1901–1976), Matthew Sullivan Jr. (1901–1984) and James C. Sullivan (1909–1996). Sullivan served terms on the Canton School Committee and the Canton Planning Board. He was a member of several fraternal and professional organizations, including the American Institute of Architects, which he joined in 1907. Kathrine Sullivan was involved in anti-suffragist activism in Massachusetts and later was a trustee of Westborough State Hospital.

The Sullivan family moved to Canton around 1899, after the formation of Maginnis, Walsh & Sullivan. In 1906, Sullivan designed and built a large suburban house on upper Washington Street north of the town center in what was then a relatively undeveloped part of the town. Sullivan's house was designed in the Arts and Crafts style and was structurally unique. It was built using a structural system of specially designed terra cotta blocks which offered protection from fire as well as insulation. Located at 1973 Washington Street, the house was sold out of the family and demolished in the 1980s. The property is now the location of a small residential development called Sullivan Way.

Matthew Sullivan died unexpectedly in his Boston office on August 11, 1938. His wife died August 23, 1947, in Canton.

Both Sullivan and his wife were parishioners of the church of St. John the Evangelist in Canton. They and their children were buried in the parish cemetery.

== Architectural works ==
=== Parish churches ===
- St. Agnes, Reading, Massachusetts (1908–09)
- St. John the Baptist, New Bedford, Massachusetts (1909–13)
- St. Joseph, (Note: Now known as St. Andrew the Apostle.) Taunton, Massachusetts (1909–10)
- Sacred Heart, (Note: Now known as Annunciation of the Lord.) Taunton, Massachusetts (1911–12)
- St. Augustin, Newport, Rhode Island (1911–12)
- Blessed Sacrament, Walpole, Massachusetts (1912)
- Our Lady of Lourdes (former), Wellfleet, Massachusetts (1912)
- Our Lady of Hope, West Barnstable, Massachusetts (1915)
- St. Benedict, Warwick, Rhode Island (1915, demolished)
- St. Joseph (upper church), Holbrook, Massachusetts (1916, altered 1972)
- St. Leo the Great, Pawtucket, Rhode Island (1916–17)
- St. Rita, Marion, Massachusetts (1916)
- Our Lady of Mount Carmel (upper church), East Boston, Boston, Massachusetts (1917–20)
- St. Lazarus, East Boston, Boston, Massachusetts (1922–23)
- St. Mary, Franklin, Massachusetts (1923–27)
- All Saints, Haverhill, Massachusetts (1925)
- St. Therese, Everett, Massachusetts (1928–29, demolished 2020)
- St. Mary, Walpole, Massachusetts (1929–31)
- Holy Family, Lynn, Massachusetts (no date)

=== Other parish buildings ===
- Parochial school, St. Rose of Lima, Chelsea, Massachusetts (1911)
- Rectory, St. John the Baptist, New Bedford, Massachusetts (1913)
- Rectory, St. Lazarus, East Boston, Boston, Massachusetts (1916)
- Rectory, Our Lady of Lourdes, Jamaica Plain, Boston, Massachusetts (1920)
- Parochial school, St. Mark the Evangelist, Dorchester, Boston, Massachusetts (1922–23)
- Parochial school (former), St. Mary, North Attleborough, Massachusetts (1924)
- Convent, St. John the Evangelist, Swampscott, Massachusetts (1926)
- Convent, St. Leonard of Port Maurice, Boston, Massachusetts (1926)
- Rectory (former), St. Joseph, Everett, Massachusetts (1926–27)
- Parochial high school (former), St. Thomas Aquinas, Jamaica Plain, Boston, Massachusetts (1927)
- Parochial school, Our Lady of Grace, Everett, Massachusetts (1927)
- Rectory, St. Mary, Franklin, Massachusetts (1932)

=== Institutional projects ===
- Mount St. Mary Academy (former), Fall River, Massachusetts (1909)
- Bishop Stang Day Nursery, Fall River, Massachusetts (1910, demolished)
- Harkins Hall, Providence College, Providence, Rhode Island (1918–19)
- Memorial Dining Hall, St. John's Preparatory School, Danvers, Massachusetts (1926)
- Italian Home for Children, Jamaica Plain, Boston, Massachusetts (1927)

=== Secular buildings ===
- House for Roger Williams, Canton, Massachusetts (1915)
- Canton Police Station (former), Canton, Massachusetts (1931)

== Gallery of architectural works ==
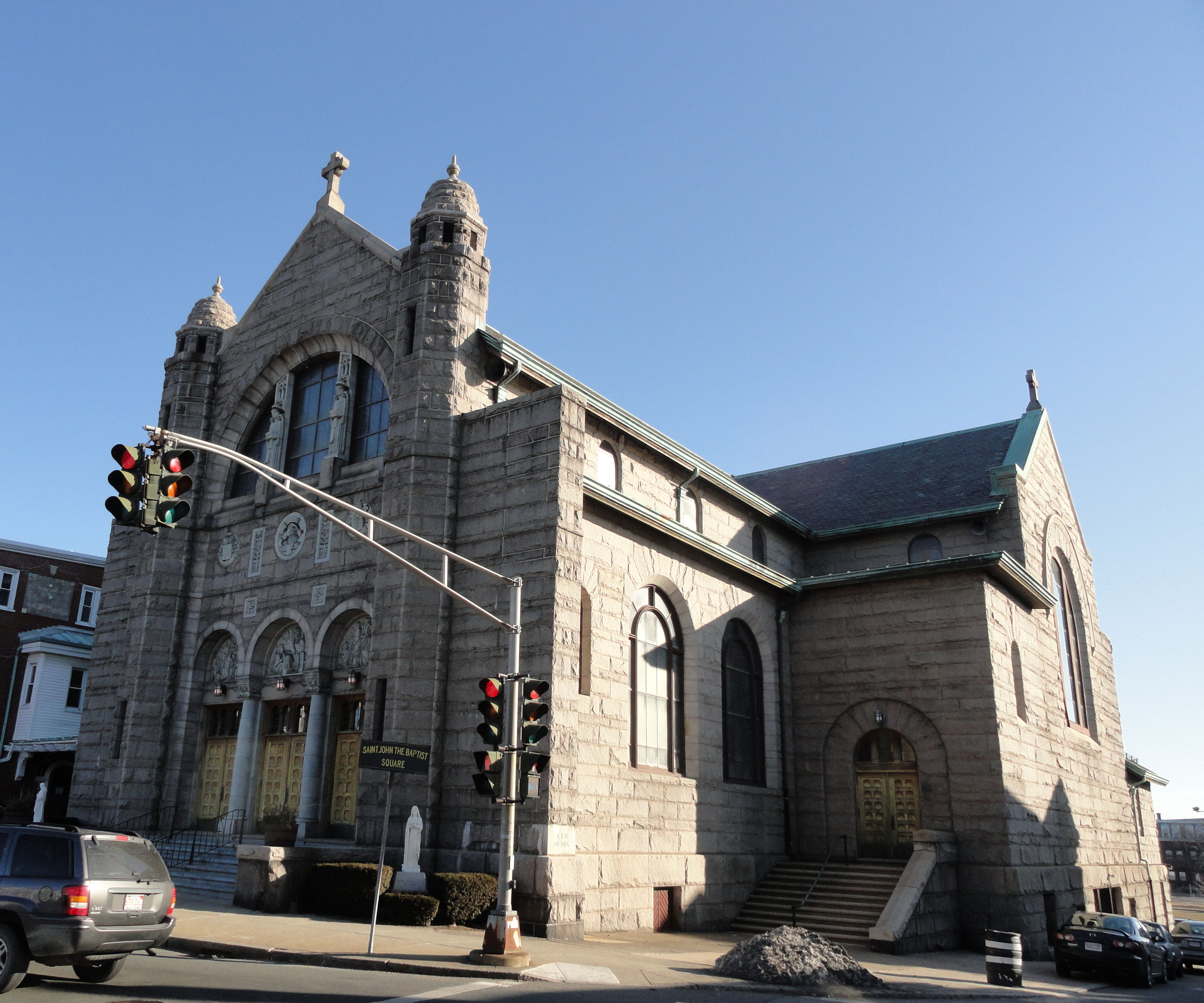
St. John the Baptist R. C. Church, New Bedford, Massachusetts, 1909-13.

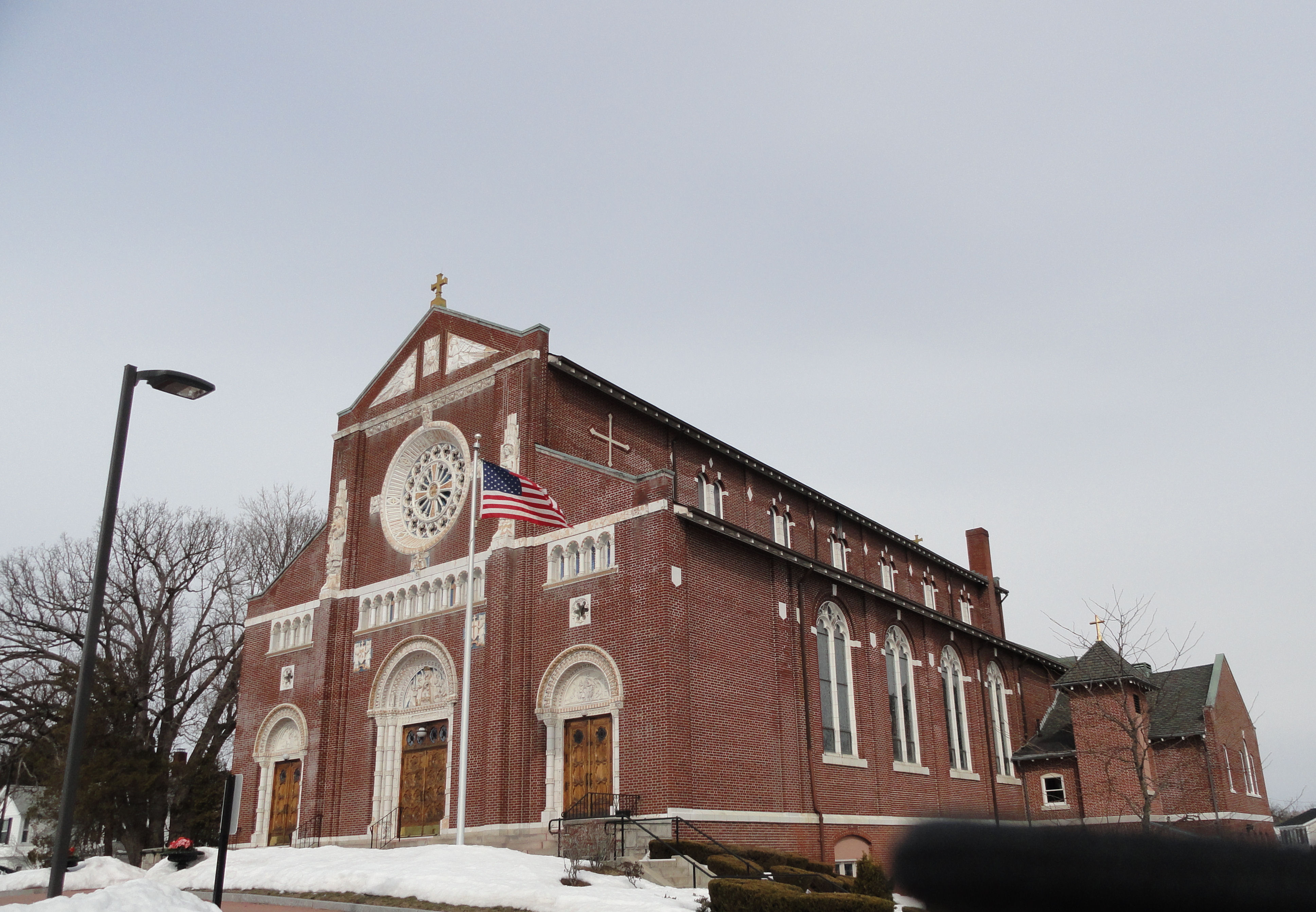
Sacred Heart R. C. Church, Taunton, Massachusetts, 1911-12.

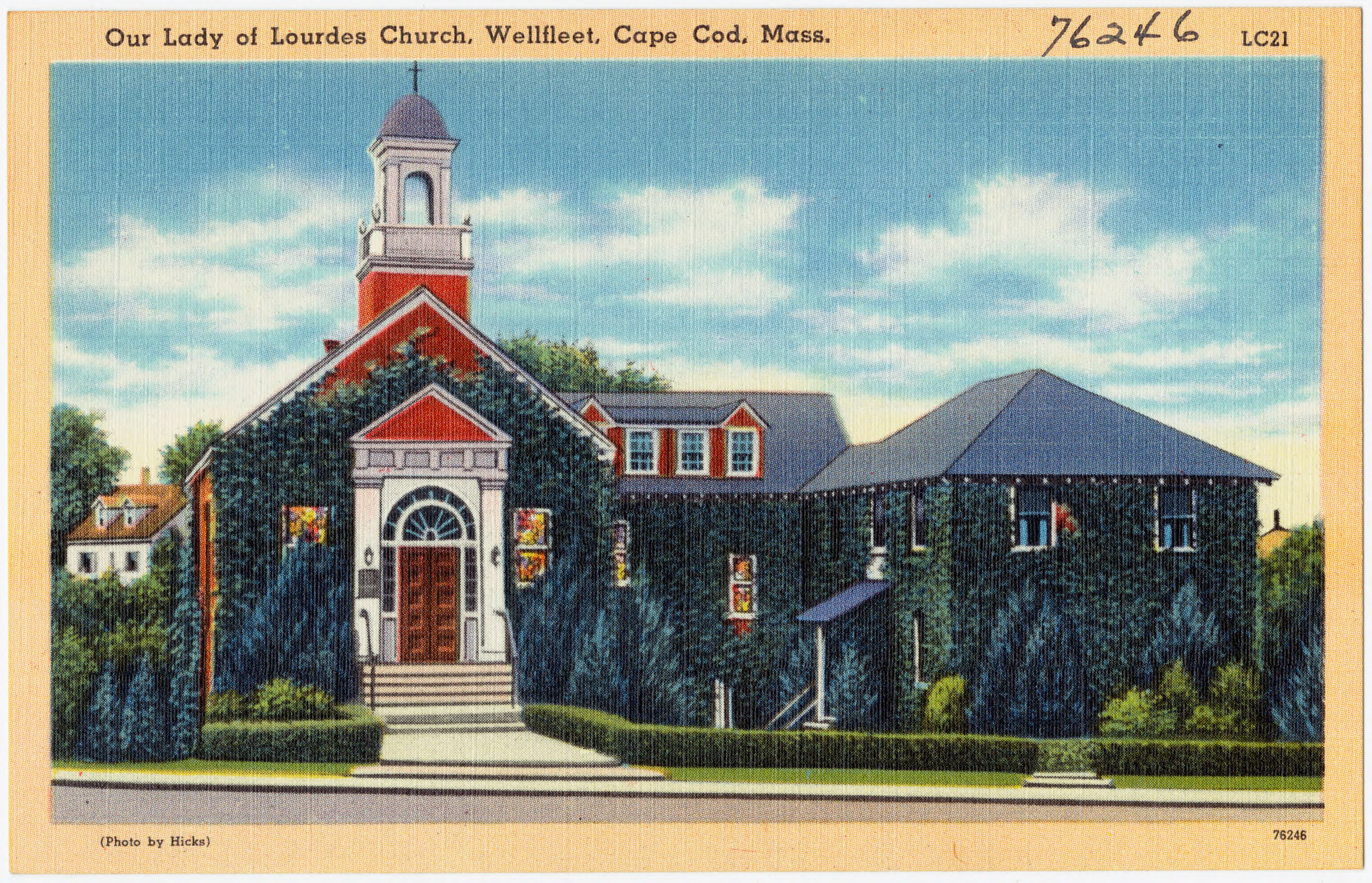
Our Lady of Lourdes R. C. Church, Wellfleet, Massachusetts, 1912.

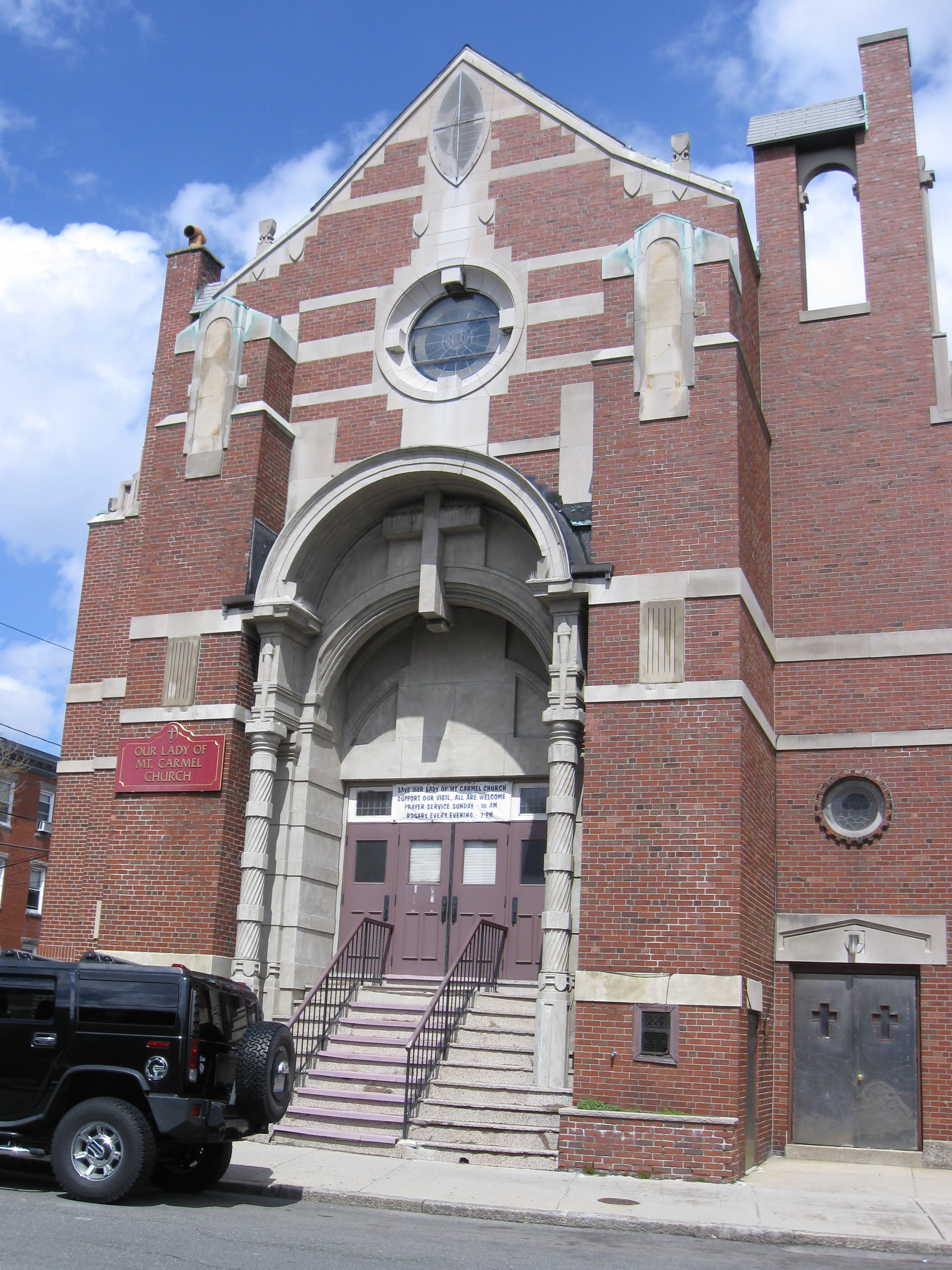
Our Lady of Mount Carmel R. C. Church, East Boston, Boston, Massachusetts, 1917-20.

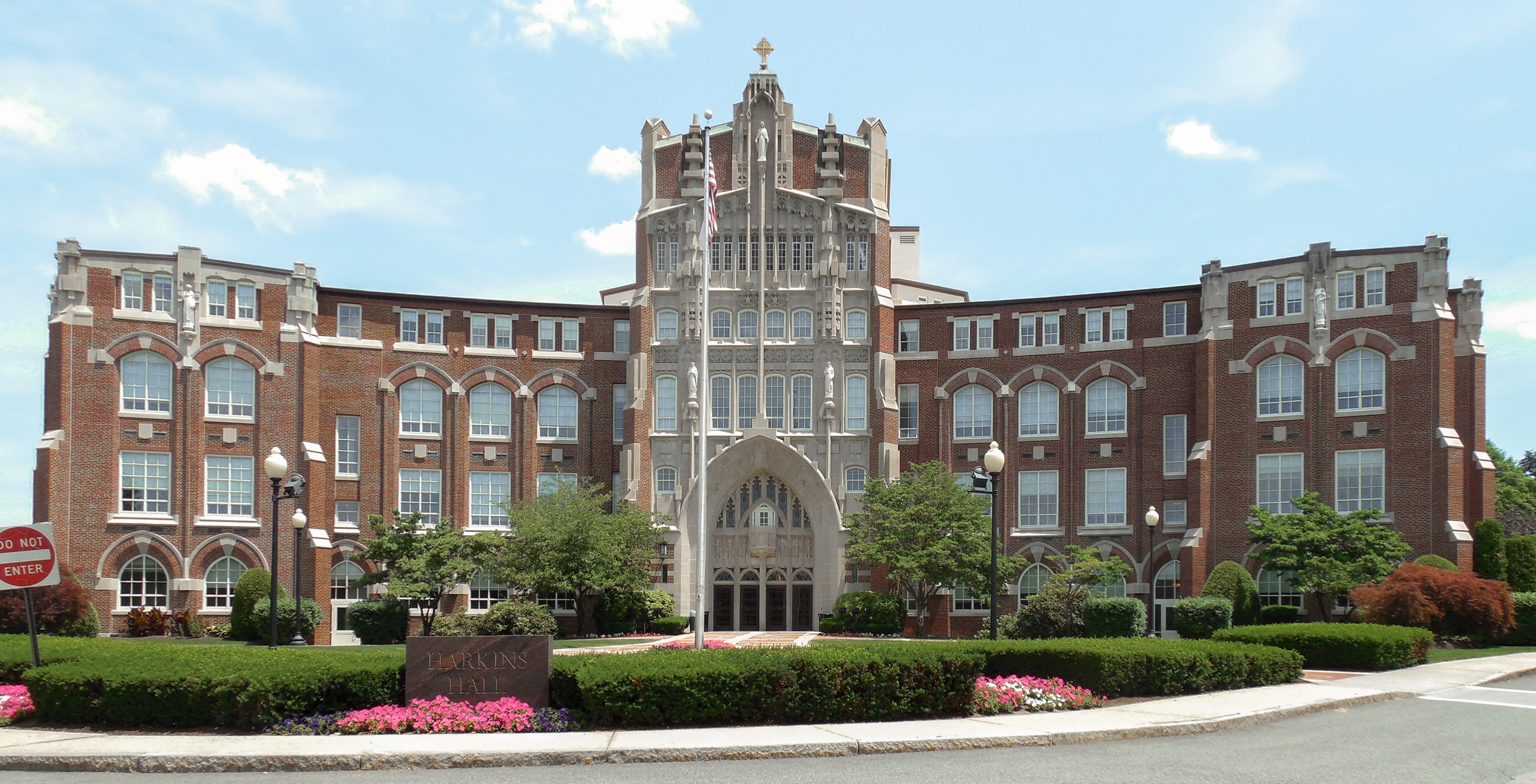
Harkins Hall, Providence College, Providence, Rhode Island, 1918-19.

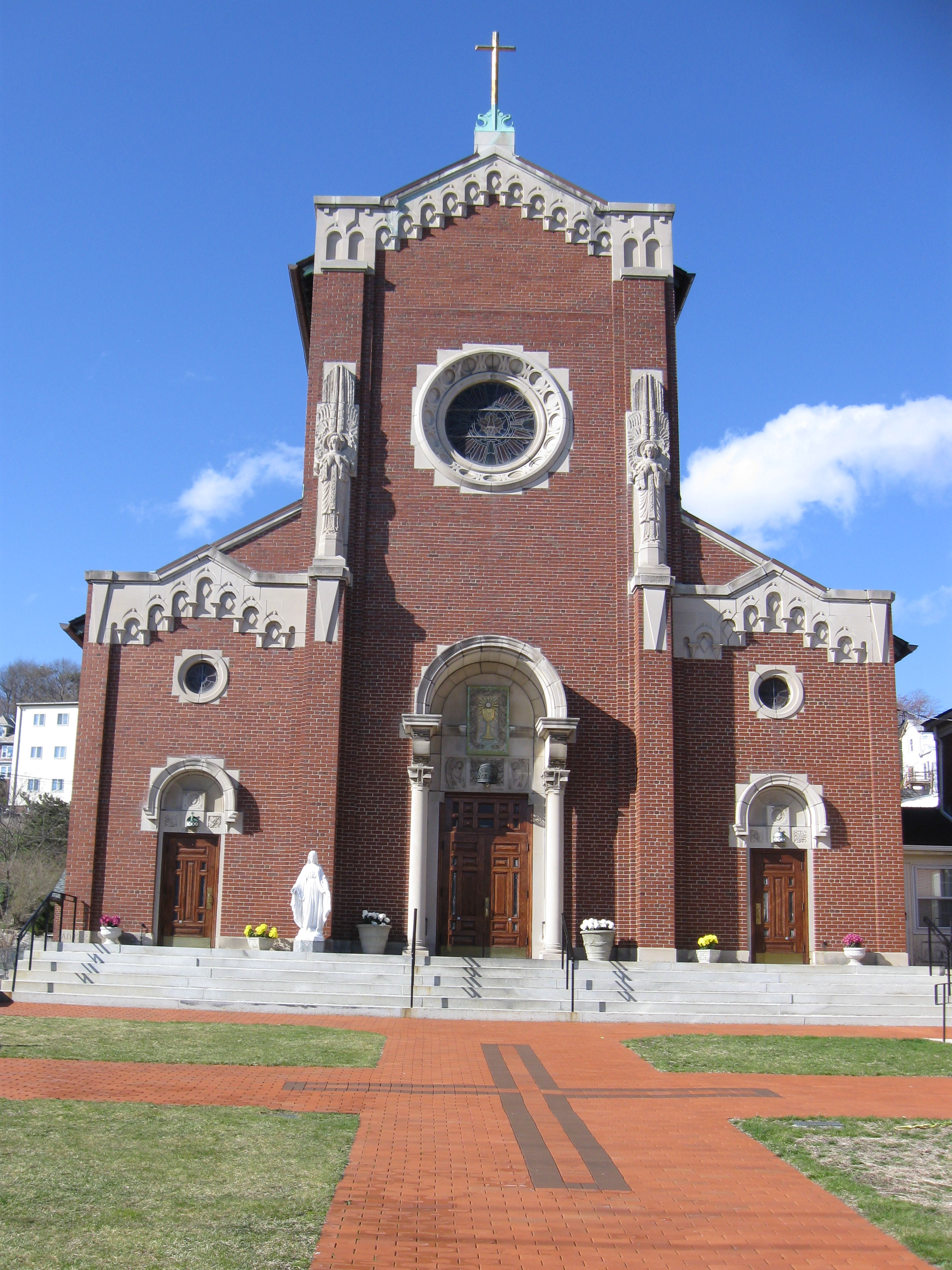
St. Lazarus R. C. Church, East Boston, Boston, Massachusetts, 1922-23.

== Bibliography ==
Hayman, Robert W. (1995). Catholicism in Rhode Island and the Diocese of Providence Volume Two, Providence: Diocese of Providence. Library of Congress Number: 94-69200 page 410, 419, 445, 586–587, 598, 592
