= Dominic Hall (Providence College) =

Historic house in Rhode Island, United States

- William L. Bailey House
- U.S. National Register of Historic Places
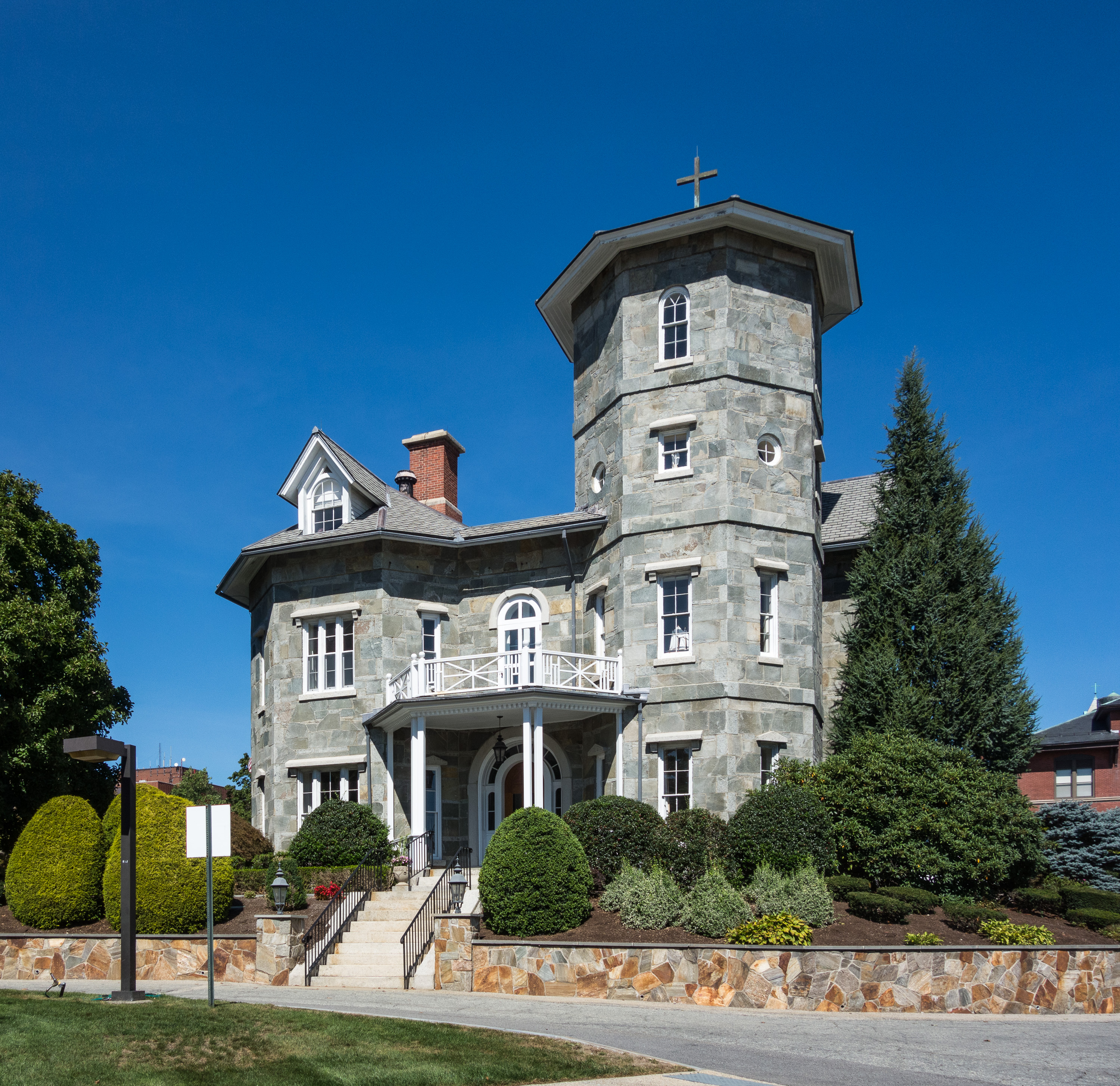

- Location within Rhode Island Location within the United States
- Location: Providence, Rhode Island
- Coordinates: 41°50′31″N 71°26′7″W
- Architectural style: Italian Villa
- NRHP reference No.: 73000064
- Added to NRHP: March 7, 1973

Dominic Hall, also known as St. Dominic House and the William L. Bailey House, is a historic house on the Providence College campus in Providence, Rhode Island. It is a 2 1/2-story stone-faced structure with timber framing, and a prominent octagonal four-story tower at its southeastern corner. The house was built in the 1850s by William Bailey, who had a 23-acre (9.3 ha) estate. In the early 20th century the estate was acquired by the local Dominican Order, which used it as a convent and girls' school. The property was then absorbed by Providence College (also a Dominican project).

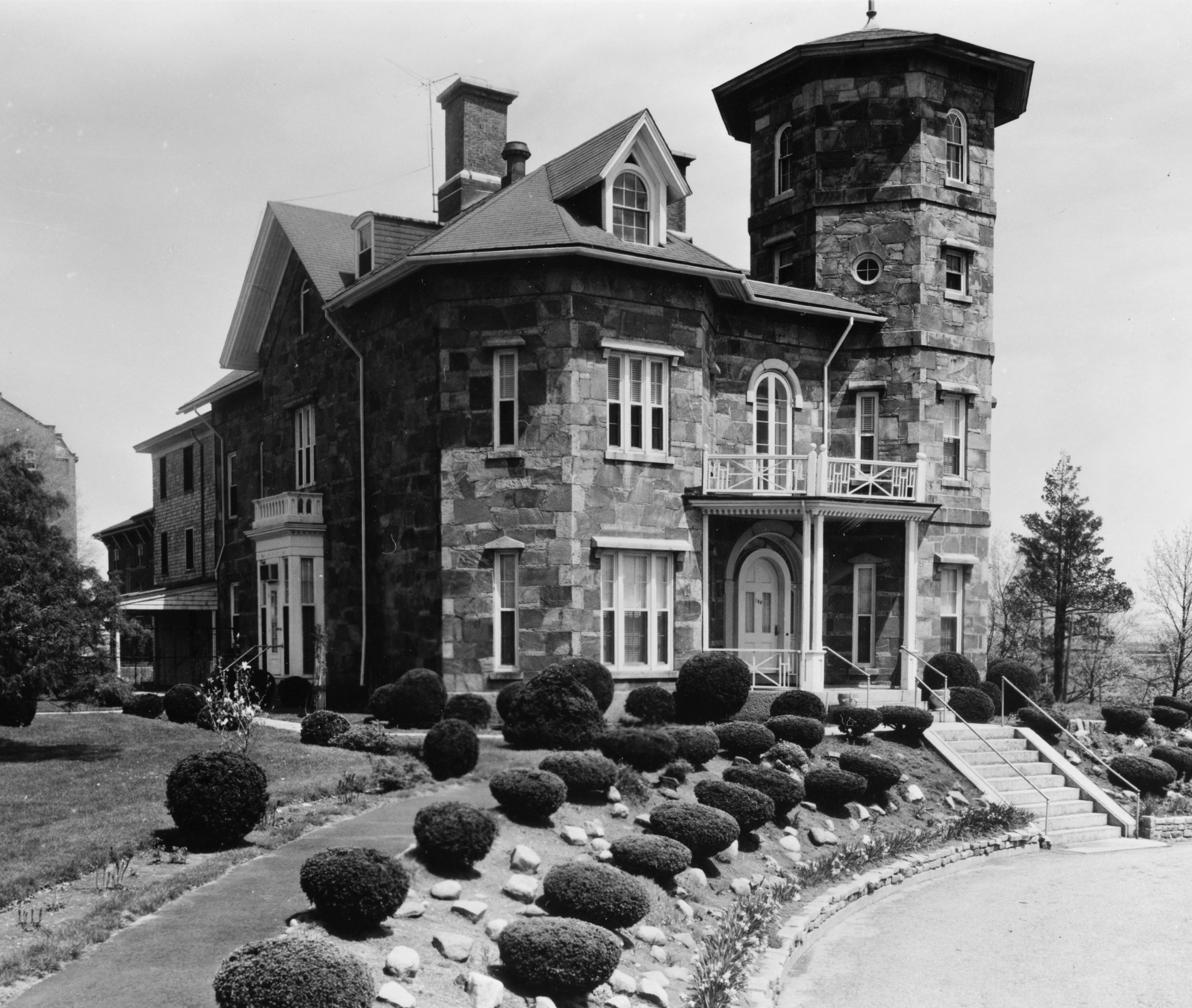
1958

The house was listed on the National Register of Historic Places in 1973. It presently serves as the official residence of the college president.

== See also ==
- George M. Bradley House (aka Martin Hall), which stands nearby
- National Register of Historic Places listings in Providence, Rhode Island
