= St. John the Baptist Church (New Bedford, Massachusetts) =

Coordinates: 41°37′37.02″N 70°55′38.38″W

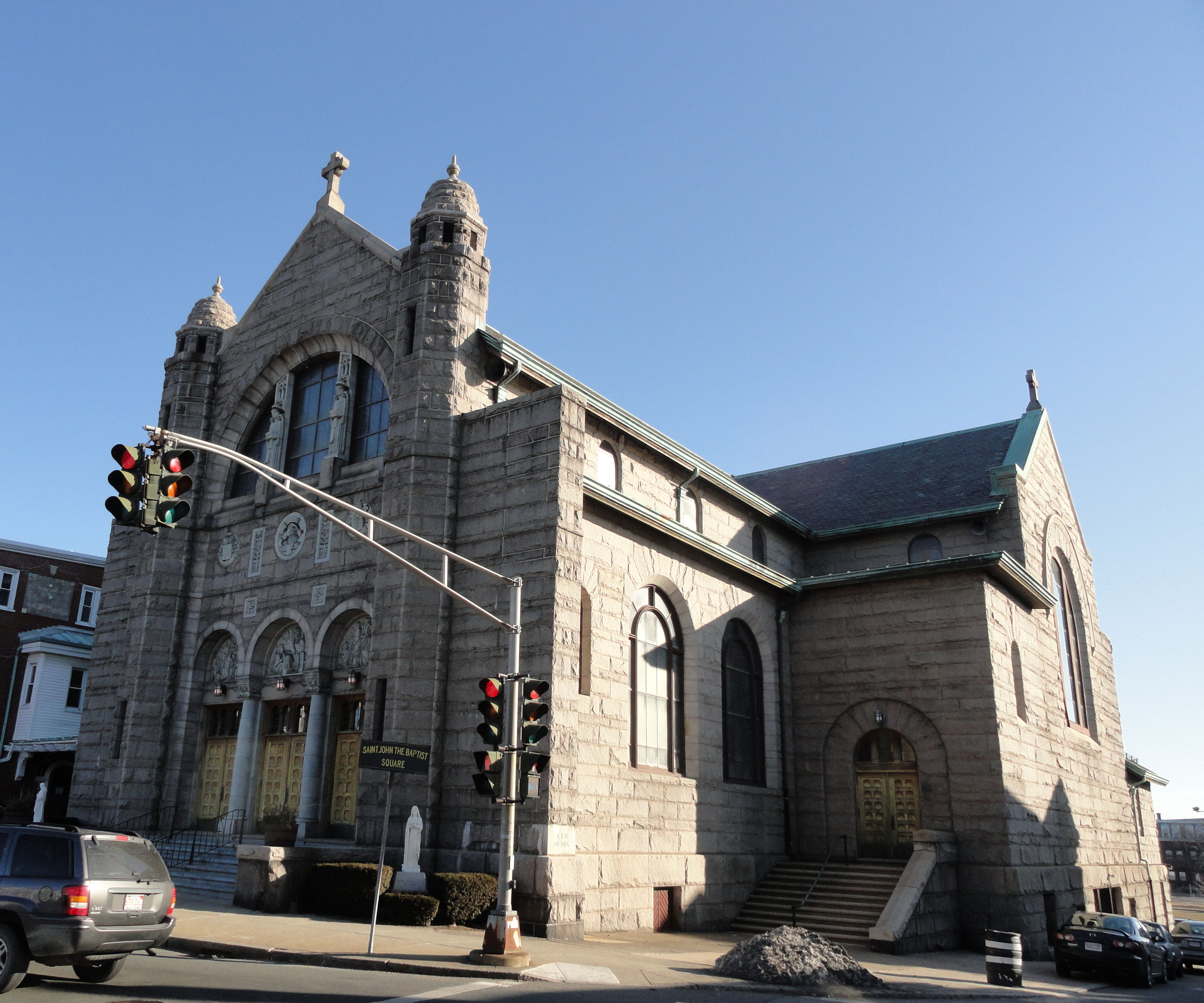
- St. John the Baptist Church; Mathew Sullivan, architect
- St. John the Baptist Church
- Location: 344 County Street; New Bedford, Massachusetts
- Country: United States
- Denomination: Roman Catholic

History
- Founded: 1871
- Dedicated: 1875

Architecture
- Architect: Matthew Sullivan
- Architectural type: Romanesque Revival
- Closed: 2012

Administration
- Province: Boston
- Diocese: Fall River

Clergy
- Bishop: Most Rev. George W. Coleman

St. John the Baptist is a historic church in New Bedford, Massachusetts, and a former parish of the Roman Catholic Church in the Diocese of Fall River. At its closure, it had been the oldest Portuguese-American parish in the United States.

== History ==
St. John the Baptist parish was founded in 1871 to serve the Portuguese community in the area, becoming the second parish in New Bedford.

Portuguese immigration declined in the early 21st century, and later generations moved beyond New Bedford and Fall River, even as the cost of maintaining the historic church continued to rise. In 2009, the parish and finance councils asked the Diocese to evaluate its viability. The diocese set goals for membership and activity, but the parish failed to meet them, and in March 2012, its closure was announced. The parish was merged with that of nearby Our Lady of Mount Carmel, and the church shuttered in November.

== Building ==
The first church, dedicated in 1875, was destroyed by fire in 1908. The present Romanesque style church with Byzantine elements was built in 1913 to the designs of Boston architect Matthew Sullivan.
