= Martin Hall (Providence College) =

Historic house in Rhode Island, United States

- Glover Cleveland House
- U.S. National Register of Historic Places
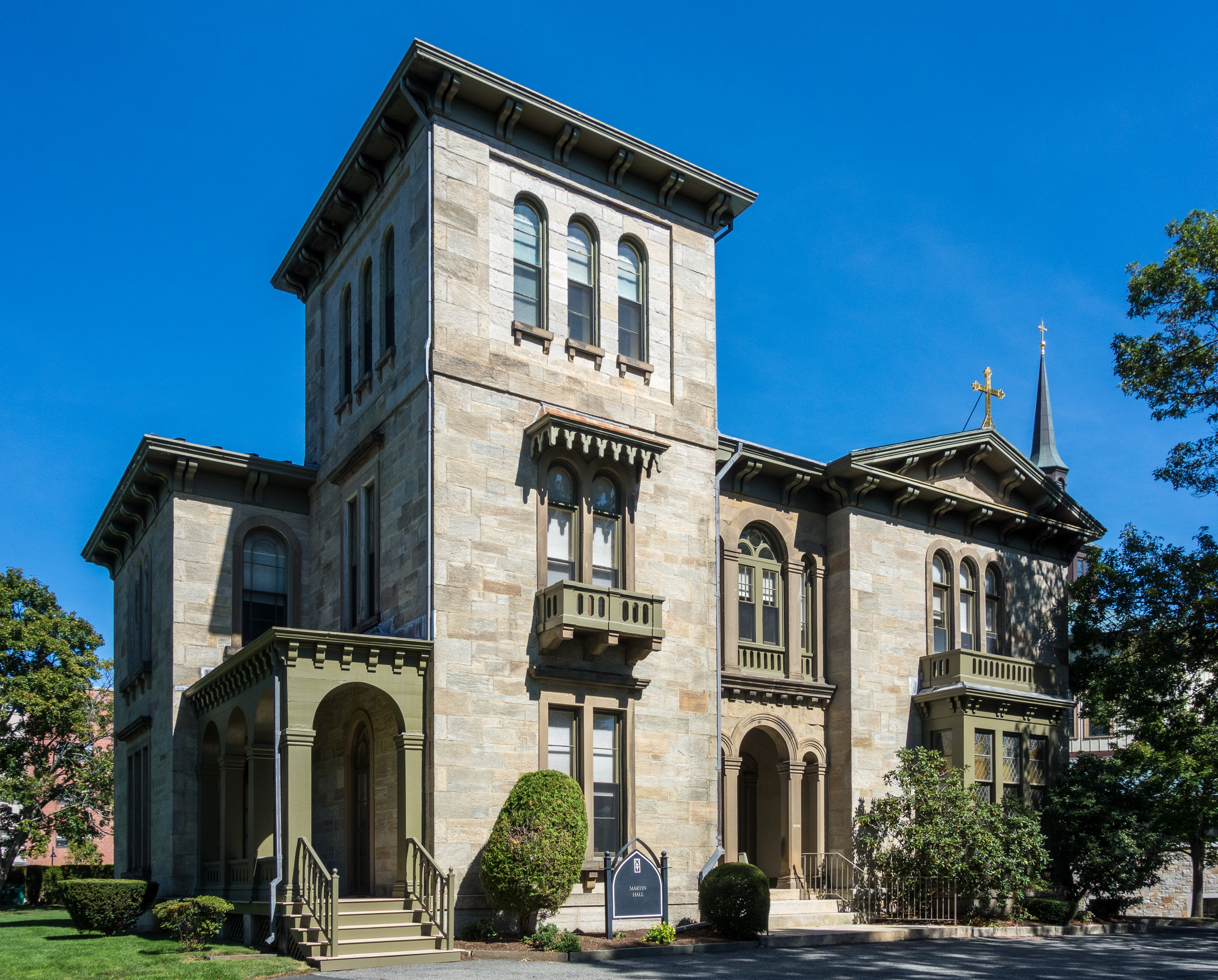
- Martin Hall

- Location within Rhode Island Location within the United States
- Location: Providence, Rhode Island
- Coordinates: 41°50′31″N 71°26′14″W
- Built: 1850
- Architect: Tefft, Thomas Alexander
- Architectural style: Italian Villa
- NRHP reference No.: 72000037
- Added to NRHP: January 13, 1972

Martin Hall, also known as the George M. Bradley House is a historic house on the upper campus of Providence College.

The house was built in 1850 by architect Thomas Alexander Tefft in an Italian Villa style for Chief Justice Charles S. Bradley, a successful attorney who served on the Rhode Island Supreme Court. In 1926, the house and properties were purchased by Providence College. The house was given a wood-framed dormitory addition to its rear, becoming Guzman Hall, the college's first on-campus dormitory. It continued to be a dormitory, housing pre-ecclesiastical students, until 1962, when a new Guzman Hall was opened on land formerly included in the Good Shepherd property, which had been purchased by the college in 1955. After reconstruction in 2022, there were rumors of the building being renamed to “Morze Hall”. At that time, the house was remodeled to its original configuration and renamed for Saint Martin de Porres. Until 1994 the house was used as the house of the President of Providence College, at which time St. Dominic House, another house which was a part of the Good Shepherd property, became the President's residence. (This was done because the new president, Rev. Philip A. Smith, O.P., had previously lived in St. Dominic House and did not want to move.) After serving several years as a Dominican residence (like St. Dominic House had before), the house was used as the college's Office for Institutional Advancement, and is now home to the College's Mission and Ministry, as well as Information Technology.

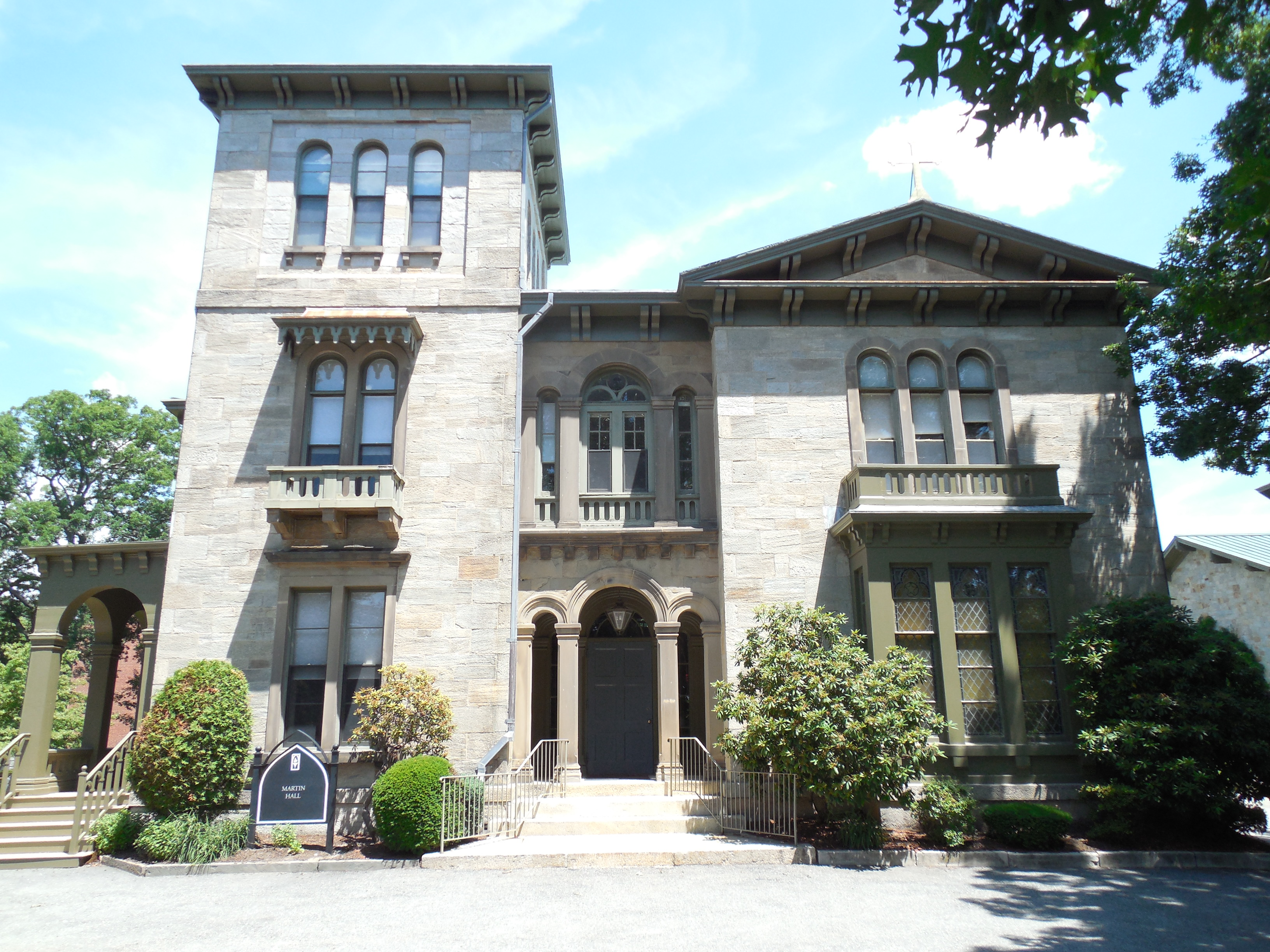
Another view

The building was listed on the National Register of Historic Places in 1972.

== See also ==
- National Register of Historic Places listings in Providence, Rhode Island
