= Mary Tillinghast =

British cook and writer

Mary Tillinghast was a British cook and writer best known for her work Rare and Excellent Receipts by Mary Tillinghast (1690).
