= Justice Tillinghast =

Justice Tillinghast may refer to:

- Pardon E. Tillinghast (1836–1905), chief justice of the Rhode Island Supreme Court
- Thomas Tillinghast (1742–1821), associate justice of the Rhode Island Supreme Court
