= Our Lady of Mount Carmel Church (East Boston, Massachusetts) =

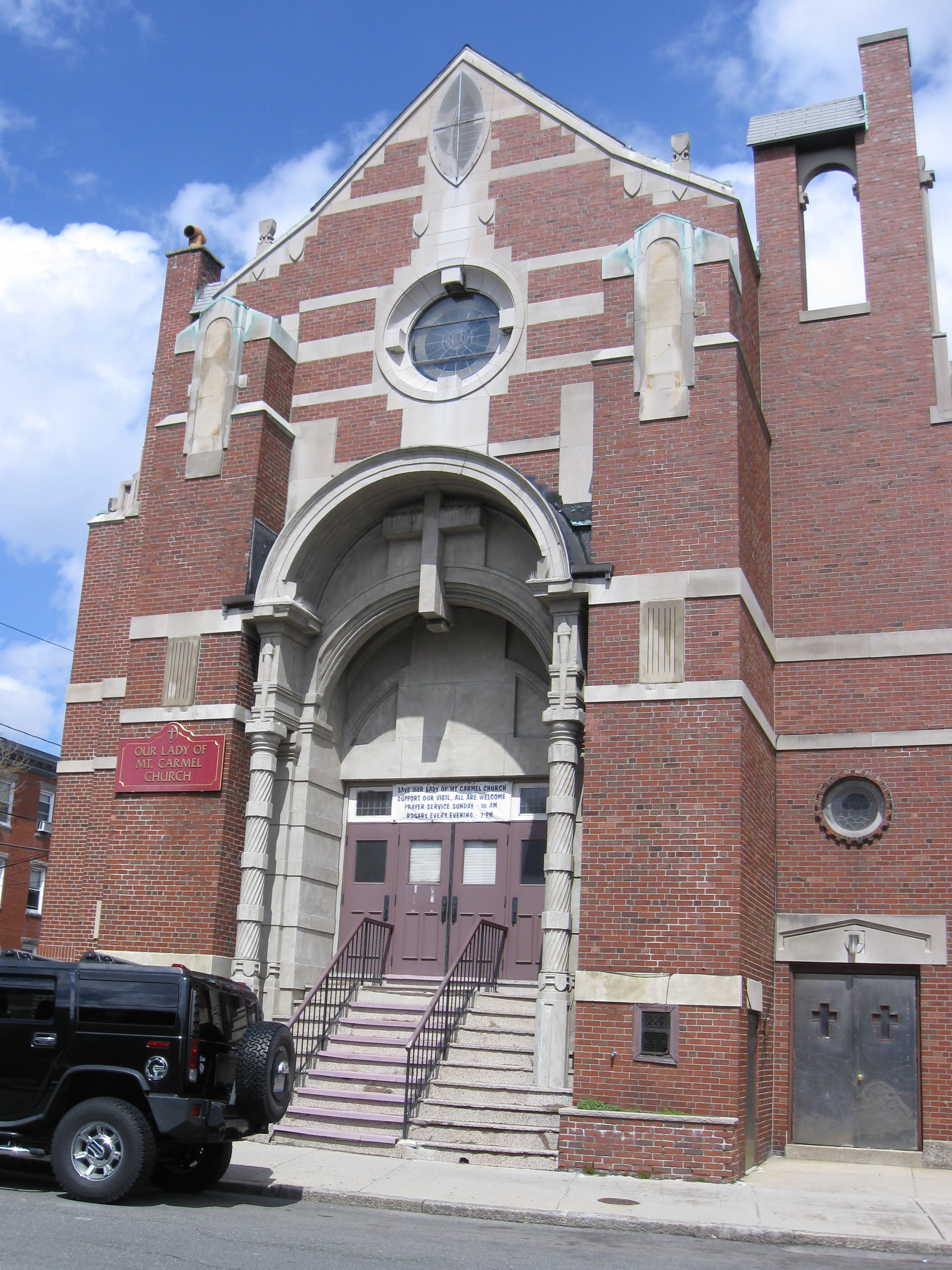
- View of the church facade in 2011.

- Location in Boston, Massachusetts
- 42.3703°N 71.0343°W
- Location: 128 Gove Street; East Boston, Massachusetts
- Country: United States
- Denomination: Roman Catholic

History
- Status: Church
- Dedication: Our Lady of Mount Carmel

Architecture
- Completed: 1905

Administration
- Archdiocese: Roman Catholic Archdiocese of Boston

Our Lady of Mount Carmel was a Roman Catholic church located at 128 Gove Street in East Boston, Massachusetts.

== History ==
The church was built in 1905 and was a focal point of the local Italian American community until it was ordered shut down by the Roman Catholic Archdiocese of Boston in late 2004.

On October 10, 2004, as the final mass was celebrated, parishioners claimed that a statue of the Virgin Mary fell to the ground from its perch in front of the altar. Some proclaimed that this was a sign.

At first, the church was occupied by parishioners day and night, marking the longest such occupation in the history of the Roman Catholic Church in United States. Today, after appeals to the decision through the courts and the Vatican, attempts have been unsuccessful and the waning enthusiasm and aging of the occupiers has left the church empty. After the developer Rise Together was unable to secure funding for a residential conversion plan, the property, Church Building, Convent and Rectory were foreclosed on by the Bank of New England. The properties are now boarded up and are in a derelict condition.

== Parish school ==
East Boston Central Catholic School, on the Most Holy Redeemer Parish site, is the Catholic K1-8 school designated for this parish. The school is managed by a board from the Our Lady of the Assumption, Our Lady of Mount Carmel, Most Holy Redeemer and Sacred Heart parishes.
