= Providence College =

Catholic university in Providence, Rhode Island, U.S.

- Motto: Veritas
- Motto in English: Truth
- Type: Private university
- Established: 1917; 109 years ago
- Accreditation: NECHE
- Religious affiliation: Catholic (Dominican)
- Academic affiliations: ACCU; NAICU; Space-grant
- Endowment: $321 million (2023)
- President: Kenneth R. Sicard
- Faculty: 310 full-time ordinary 28 Dominican friars and sisters
- Students: 4,816 (Spring 2021)
- Undergraduates: 4,363 (Fall 2023)
- Postgraduates: 688 (Spring 2021)
- Location: Providence, Rhode Island, United States; 41°50′38″N 71°26′06″W
- Campus: 105 acres (.425 km^{2}); Urban
- Colors: Providence Black, Pantone Metallic 877, and White
- Nickname: Friars
- Sporting affiliations: NCAA Division I – Big East; Hockey East; NEISA
- Mascots: Friar Dom; Huxley the Dalmatian
- Website: providence.edu

Providence College is a private Catholic university in Providence, Rhode Island, United States. Founded in 1917 by the Dominican Order and the Diocese of Providence, it offers 47 undergraduate majors and 17 graduate programs. In the fall of 2025, it enrolled 4,494 undergraduate students and 496 graduate students for a total enrollment of 4,990 students. In athletics, Providence College competes in NCAA Division I, and is a founding member of the original Big East Conference and Hockey East. It was part of the original six other basketball-centric Catholic colleges which broke off from the original Big East (today's American Athletic Conference) to form the current Big East at the start of the 2013–14 academic year.

== History ==
=== Founding ===
In 1917, Providence College was founded as an all-male school through the efforts of the Diocese of Providence and the Dominican Province of St. Joseph. The central figure in the college's incorporation was Matthew Harkins, Bishop of Providence, who sought an institution that would establish a center of advanced learning for the Catholic youth of Rhode Island.

Opening its doors at the corner of Eaton Street and River Avenue with only one building, Harkins Hall, the college under inaugural president Dennis Albert Casey, O.P. (1917–1921), began with 71 students and nine Dominican faculty members. Under second president William D. Noon, O.P. (1921–1927), the college added its first lay faculty member and opened its first dormitory, Guzman Hall (now known as Martin Hall). Under President Lorenzo C. McCarthy, O.P. (1927–1936), Providence College athletics soon received their moniker as the "Friars." With black and white as team colors, the school had early success in basketball, football, and baseball. In 1933, the school received regional accreditation by the New England Association of Schools and Colleges. The college conferred its first Master of Arts, Doctor of Philosophy, and Master of Science degrees by 1935, which was also the year that the school's newspaper (The Cowl) was first published.

The college's fundraising efforts during World War II spurred the physical growth of the campus. One of the most notable gifts came from a young MGM film star, Judy Garland, who at just fifteen years old, sold autographs in front of the Loew's State Theater for $5-$10 per copy on February 18, 1938. Judy brought the gifts to a Bridge and Fashion Show and gave them to Father Dillon's Aquinas Hall Fund.

By 1939, Aquinas Hall dormitory had been built to accommodate more students enrolling in general studies, but with the impact of World War II upon enrollment, President John J. Dillon, O.P. (1936–1944) lobbied Rhode Island's congressional delegation to pressure the War Department to assign Providence College an Army Specialized Training Program unit. Unit #1188 arrived on campus in the summer of 1943, allowing the college to continue operation. A class of approximately 380 soldiers-in-training studied engineering at Providence College for a year before going overseas.

=== Post-World War II expansion ===
Robert J. Slavin, O.P. served as president from 1947 to 1961. During his tenure in 1955, Providence acquired the House of Good Shepherd property that pushed the original boundaries of campus to Huxley Avenue. Slavin also oversaw the establishment of the Reserve Officers' Training Corps (ROTC) on campus in 1951 and the Liberal Arts Honors Program in 1957.

The athletics program of the college was accepted into the National Collegiate Athletic Association (NCAA) in 1948. Prior to the opening of Alumni Hall gymnasium in 1955, the men's basketball team played in local Providence high schools. The college hired Joe Mullaney as the men's basketball coach.

President Vincent C. Dore, O.P. (1961–1965) opened the doors of the college's graduate school as well as a new dormitory building, now called Meagher Hall. President William P. Haas, O.P. (1965–1971) opened Phillips Memorial Library in 1969.

=== Co-educational shift ===
In 1967, the college added its first lay faculty members in the Departments of Theology and Philosophy, as well as its first full-time female faculty member. Two years later, the student dress code was abolished. In 1970, the college decided to admit women starting with the 1971–1972 school year. The same year, the first female administrator was hired. By 1975, the first year in which women graduated after completing a four-year course of study, women had attained highly visible positions in school organizations. Anne Martha Frank was the first woman to edit The Cowl, the college's weekly newspaper. Patricia Slonina became the first woman editor of the literary magazine, The Alembic. Ana Margarita Cabrera was the first woman to edit the school yearbook, The Veritas.

Subsequent president Thomas R. Peterson (1971–1985) instituted the Development of Western Civilization program, while in 1974, the college acquired the property of the former Charles V. Chapin Hospital on the other side of Huxley Avenue. The campus was then split in half by Huxley Avenue, providing an "Upper" campus (due to the uphill nature of the landscape on Smith Hill) and "Lower" campus (the new, flatter area of the college). In 1974, the School of Continuing Education awarded the college's first Associate's degree.

With men's basketball tickets becoming a hot commodity at the 2,600-seat Alumni Hall gymnasium, and with the opening of the Providence Civic Center in 1972, the Friars moved downtown in time for their Final Four appearance behind Providence natives Ernie DiGregorio and Marvin Barnes. Two years later, the men's hockey team played its first season in the new home on campus, as Schneider Arena opened in 1974 with Ron Wilson leading the way.

In the early morning hours of December 13, 1977, a dormitory fire killed ten female residents of Aquinas Hall. Meanwhile, the demographics of the student body continued to change, as women outnumbered men in incoming classes and non-Rhode Island students soon outnumbered in-state students. In 1984, Peterson also opened St. Thomas Aquinas Priory at the entrance of campus to accommodate the growing number of Dominican brethren living on campus.

=== Expansion ===
John F. Cunningham, O.P. (1985–1994) succeeded Peterson as president in 1985 and saw the Friars men's hockey team win the inaugural Hockey East Championship the same year over rival Boston College and reach the championship game of the NCAA tournament to lose 2–1 to Rensselaer Polytechnic Institute. Men's basketball again took center stage on the Providence campus, as coach Rick Pitino and senior Billy Donovan took the Friars to their second Final Four appearance in the 1987 NCAA Division I men's basketball tournament. Cunningham used the exposure and fundraising opportunities to build two apartment-style residence halls on campus, Davis and Bedford Halls, providing an alternative to dormitory and off-campus housing for upperclassmen.

Philip A. Smith, O.P. (1994–2005) succeeded Cunningham in 1994 and oversaw the new influence of women's athletics at Providence, as several alumni and then-current students won the gold medal for women's ice hockey as part of the U.S. national team in the 1998 Winter Olympics in Nagano, Japan.

By 2001, a new on-campus chapel was built, St. Dominic Chapel, followed three years later by the construction of two other major buildings on "Lower" campus: Suites Hall, a suite-style residence hall to provide added upperclassmen housing, and the Smith Center for the Arts. President Brian J. Shanley, O.P. (2005–2020) oversaw the construction of the Concannon Fitness Center in 2007 as part of an overall renovation to Alumni Hall, as well as renovation and expansion of the Slavin Center in 2009. In 2012, a groundbreaking was held for the Ruane Center for the Humanities.

Shanley also removed the college's SAT requirement for admissions in addition to transferring a significant portion of the school's scholarship funds to need-based aid, in order to give more diverse students the opportunity to afford the college. In 2008, Shanley oversaw the founding of the Providence College School of Business, creating separate Schools of Arts and Sciences and Professional Studies.

In 2018, Providence College constructed a new building dedicated to the study of natural science, called the Science Complex. In addition, the $30 million Ruane Friar Development Center (RFDC) was opened, providing a multi-purpose athletic facility featuring a new innovation lab, an expanded sports medicine center, and a student-athlete fueling station.

== Campus ==
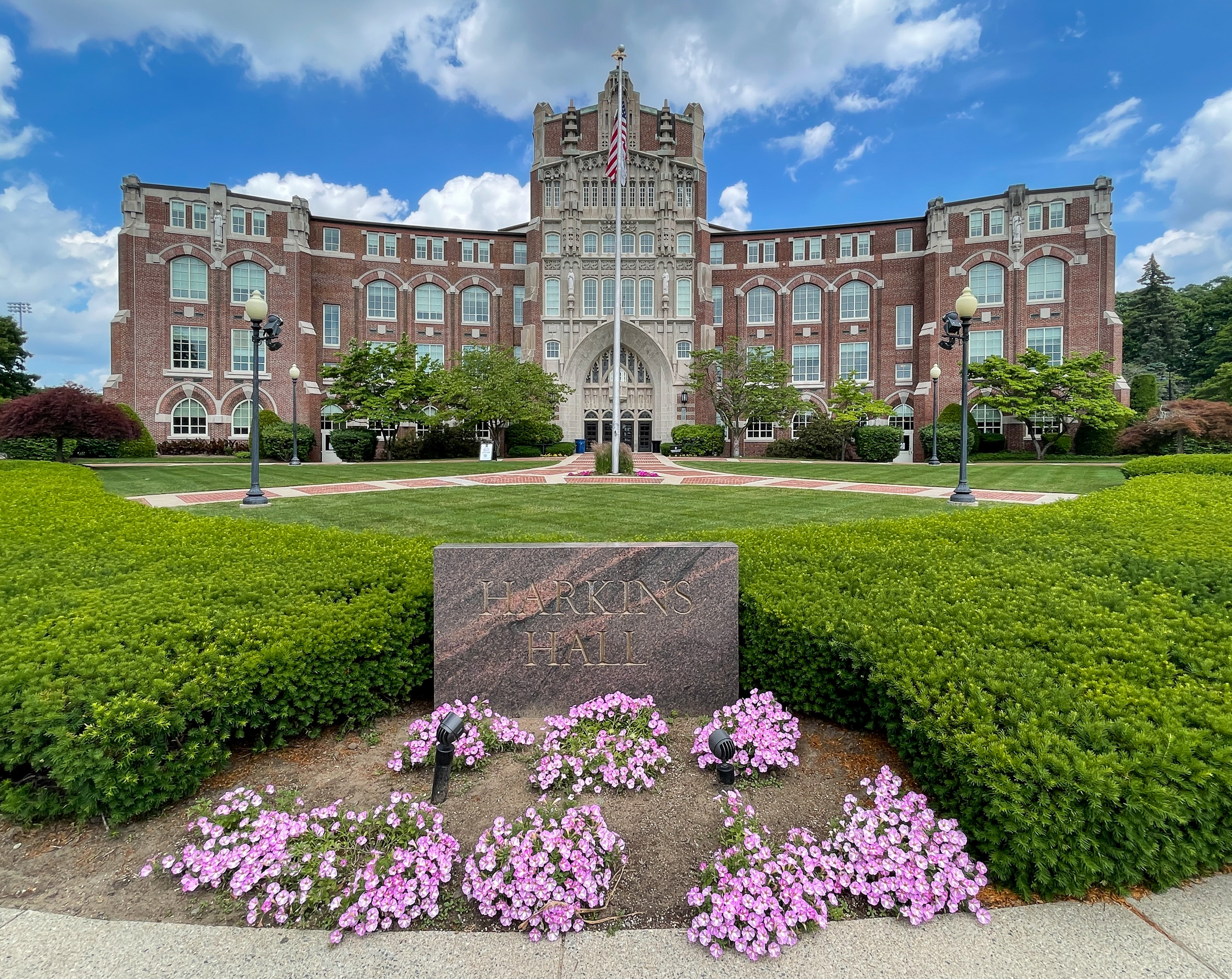
Harkins Hall (1919) designed by Matthew Sullivan in the Collegiate Gothic style

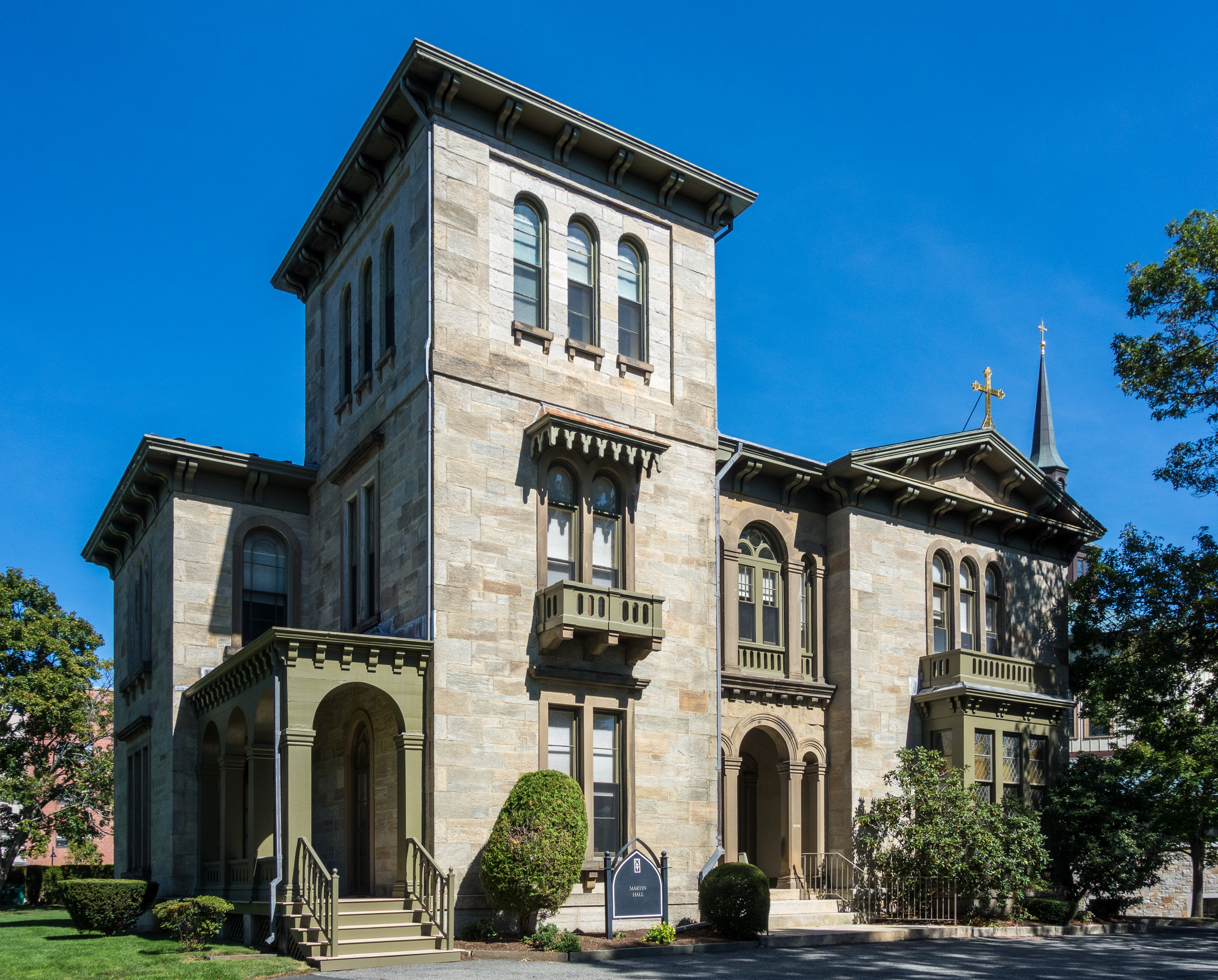
Martin Hall (1850) designed by Thomas Alexander Tefft

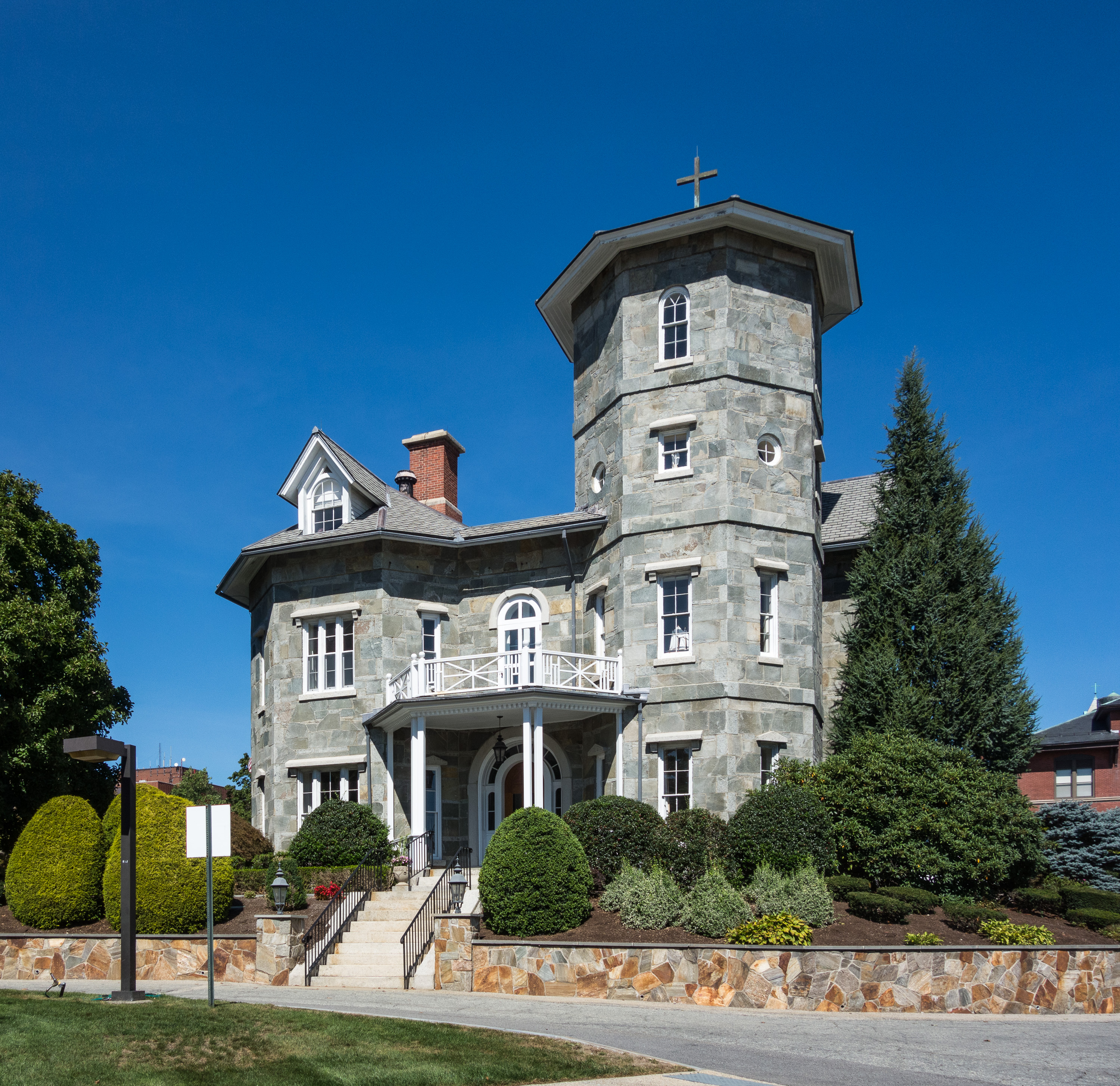
Dominic Hall (c. 1850)

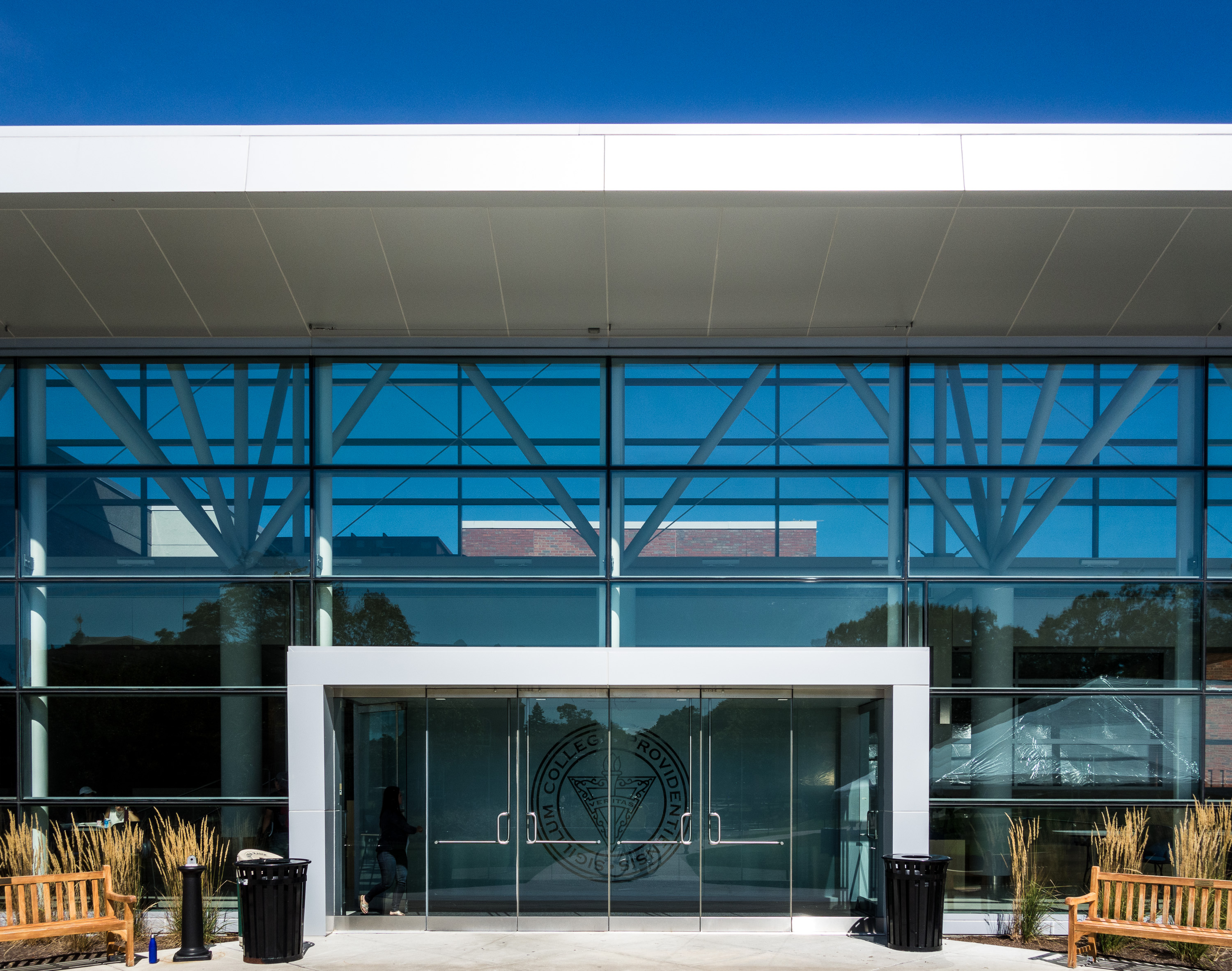
Slavin Center

The college is located on a gated 105 acres (0.42 km^{2}) campus in the city's Elmhurst neighborhood atop Smith Hill, the highest point in the city of Providence. The campus is located in a residential urban neighborhood about two miles west of downtown Providence. The Smith Hill neighborhood, which borders the east end of campus, is a predominantly low-income area with crime rates higher than the city average.

There are three main gates to campus, at Cunningham Square (the intersection of River Avenue and Eaton Street) and on Huxley Avenue to the upper campus, and at the southeast corner of the lower campus, along Eaton Street. The campus consists of nineteen academic and administrative buildings, nine dormitories, five apartment complexes, three residences, four athletic buildings, a power plant, a physical plant, and a security office gate house. There are also a Dominican cemetery, two quads, four athletic fields, a 25-meter swimming pool, a six-court tennis court complex, an artificial turf field, and several parking areas (including a structure below the turf field).

Renovations completed in 2009 to the Slavin Center, the campus student union, added solar panels and a bioretention system.

After purchasing Huxley Avenue in 2013, the college began a campus transformation project with plans to develop campus facilities to meet the growing needs of the students. The renovations as of October 2015 included the groundbreaking of the Arthur and Patricia Ryan Center for Business Studies, handicap accessibility to Aquinas Hall, and the enhancement of an outdoor classroom.

== Organization and administration ==
Since 1934, Providence College has been governed by a twelve-member corporation and a board of trustees consisting of 25 to 35 members.

The corporation consists of four ex officio members: the president of the college, the Prior Provincial of the Dominican Province of St. Joseph, the bishop of the Diocese of Providence, and the chairman of the board of trustees. In addition, there are eight other members, each of whom serves a three-year term; four are Dominican friars and four are lay persons. The corporation has the "ultimate authority to exercise control over ownership of property, to promulgate and amend the by-laws, to accept or reject the recommendation for election to the Presidency of the College by the Board of Trustees, and to elect members of the Corporation and of the Board of Trustees."

All other affairs of the college not reserved to the corporation are handled by the board of trustees, which meets three times a year. These duties include "establishing major institutional goals, engaging in long-range planning and policy-making, overseeing the annual operating budget of the College and overseeing the review process and recommending a Dominican Friar for election to the Presidency of the College." All members of the corporation and the executive vice president of the college serve on the board of trustees as ex officio, in addition to candidates elected by the corporation who serve a maximum of three three-year terms.

== Academics ==
Academic rankings

Master's
- Washington Monthly: 55

Regional
- U.S. News & World Report: 1

National
- Forbes: 264
- WSJ/College Pulse: 229

As of 2019, Providence College reports an undergraduate acceptance rate of 47.5 percent. The average class size is 21 students, with nearly half of all classes including fewer than 20 students. There is a student-to-faculty ratio of 12-to-1.

The college offers 49 majors and 34 minors. The majority of students declare majors in the liberal arts or business. Regardless of major, all undergraduate students are required to complete a core curriculum which includes credits in the Development of Western Civilization, mathematics, philosophy, theology, natural science, English, fine arts, and social science. Beginning with the Class of 2016, the core curriculum was modified to reduce the required credits in natural science and social science, while adding credits in a "core focus" area, as well as proficiencies in intensive writing, oral communication, diversity, and civic engagement.

Constructed in 1969, the Phillips Memorial Library consists of 242,000 volumes and has access to 3.5 million volumes as a member of the HELIN library consortium of Rhode Island.

=== Academic divisions ===
Providence College comprises four schools: the School of Arts & Sciences, the School of Business, the School of Education and Social Work and the School of Nursing and Health Sciences.

The School of Arts & Sciences was created in 2008 as part of the college's addition of a stand-alone School of Business. The school offers undergraduate degrees in social sciences, natural sciences, mathematics, the humanities, and fine arts. It also offers graduate programs with Masters of Arts in history, biblical studies, mathematics, and theology, as well as a Master of Theological Studies degree.

The School of Business was created in 2008 and immediately began the accreditation process for the AACSB. The college's successful accreditation was received in 2012. The school offers four undergraduate degrees, in management, finance, accountancy, and marketing and two graduate programs, a Master of Business Administration (MBA) graduate program. and a Master of Science in Business Analytics. The school also offers three graduate certificates in business analytics, digital marketing, and sports management.

Created as a separate school in 2008, the School of Professional Studies includes undergraduate and graduate degree programs in education and special education, social work, and health policy. It also offers a certificate program in special education administration.

The School of Continuing Education offers courses to complete an associate's degree or bachelor's degree with programs including social sciences, theology, organizational studies, humanities, and liberal studies. In addition, it offers numerous certificate programs, including a Teacher Certification Program (TCP).

=== Academic programs ===
==== Liberal Arts Honors Program ====
The Liberal Arts Honors Program was created in 1957 and accepts approximately the top 125 students in each freshman class, offering three levels of academic scholarships for participation in the program. Honors students take separate Development of Western Civilization courses with smaller classes, in addition to one or two honors-level classes in other programs and a capstone honors "colloquium" course.

==== Development of Western Civilization ====
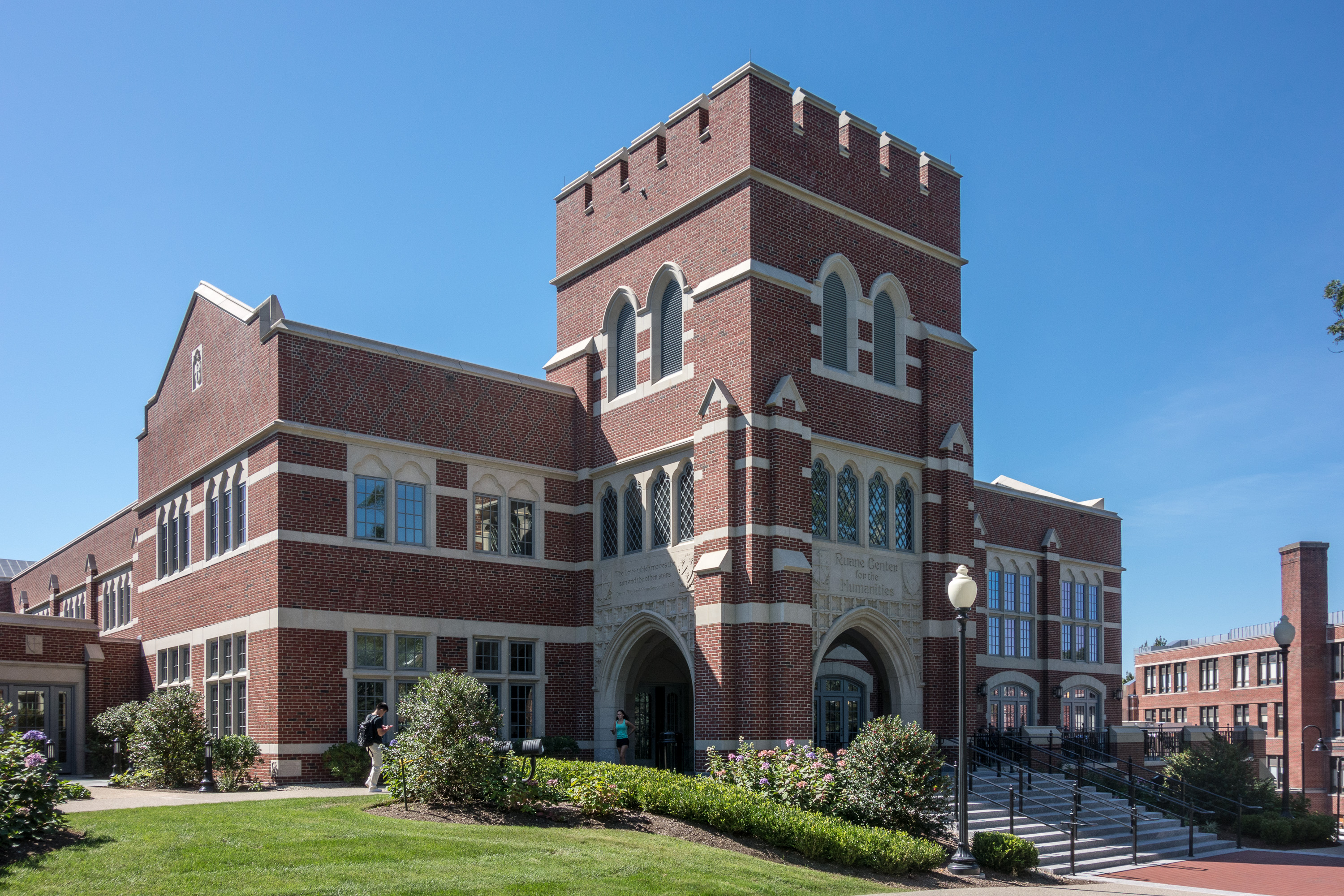
The Ruane Center for the Humanities was built in 2013 for the Development of Western Civilization program

The Development of Western Civilization (commonly referred to by students as "Civ" or "DWC") is a two-year-long program of courses required of all students attending the school, taken in students' first four semesters at the school. Meeting in the Ruane Center for the Humanities, a lecture hall specifically built in 2013 for the program, the class meets three days a week, with one day being typically reserved for seminar work and/or exams. The class is taught by a team of professors, usually three, who specialize in literature, theology, philosophy, or history. Students move through Western history, studying original texts in each of the four course disciplines. The new Development of Western Civilization Program, implemented in late 2012, features three semesters of standard lectures which move chronologically from ancient history to the modern period. The fourth and final semester of the program is organized into various colloquia, specialized courses taught by two professors that are more concentrated to students' interests and majors.

There is a tradition which has grown over time from the course called "Civ Scream." The event takes place the night before DWC final exams in December and May, and is usually centered on the "Quad" area between Aquinas, Meagher, and McDermott Halls. It is intended to be a harmless gathering to let off steam from the long hours of studying for the intense course's final exam, and is completely unsanctioned. As such, the "Civ Scream" can become loud and rowdy with wild behavior, partying, and streaking.

== Student life ==
Student body composition as of May 2, 2022
Race and ethnicity	Total
White	77%
Hispanic	10%
Other (Note: Other consists of Multiracial Americans & those who prefer to not say.)	5%
Black	3%
Asian	2%
Foreign national	2%
Economic diversity
Low-income (Note: The percentage of students who received an income-based federal Pell grant intended for low-income students.)	16%
Affluent (Note: The percentage of students who are a part of the American middle class at the bare minimum.)	84%

The Providence College student population is made up of about 3,852 undergraduates and 735 postgraduate students. As of 2012, 58 percent of the student body is female, while 42 percent is male. The student population is drawn mostly from the southern New England states of Rhode Island, Massachusetts, and Connecticut, as well as New York, New Jersey, and other Mid-Atlantic states. About one-third of incoming students attended Catholic high schools.

=== Diversity ===
A 2007 survey published by The Princeton Review rated Providence College as having the most homogeneous student population in the country, as well as ranking the college eighth nationally in the survey's "little race/class interaction" category. As of 2012, 88 percent of the student body is white or unreported, while four percent of students come from outside of the United States. In 2011, President Brian Shanley created an Office of Institutional Diversity, while hiring a Chief diversity officer, to "help balance the College's socioeconomic representation." In 2017, the school topped The Princeton Review's list of most segregated colleges.

While 95 percent of the student population are residents, 17 percent live in nearby off-campus housing. Parietal rules applying to all undergraduate freshmen limit visitation hours of opposite-sex students in dormitories.

As of 2011, Providence College is ranked first in the country by The Princeton Review in the "Lots of Hard Liquor" category.

=== Clubs and activities ===
Students run the college's radio station, WDOM, as well the on-campus television station, PCTV. The station was ranked the 11th-best college radio station in the country by the Princeton Review in 2011. The student-run campus newspaper since 1935 has been The Cowl.

The college does not officially sanction Greek life; there are no recognized fraternities or sororities on or off campus. Although there are a few unaffiliated fraternities and sororities that some Providence College students join from surrounding schools such as Brown University and Rhode Island College.

The college's oldest club/student organization is Providence College Debate Society. It was founded in 1921 and has had several periods of inactivity and subsequent revival.

== Athletics ==
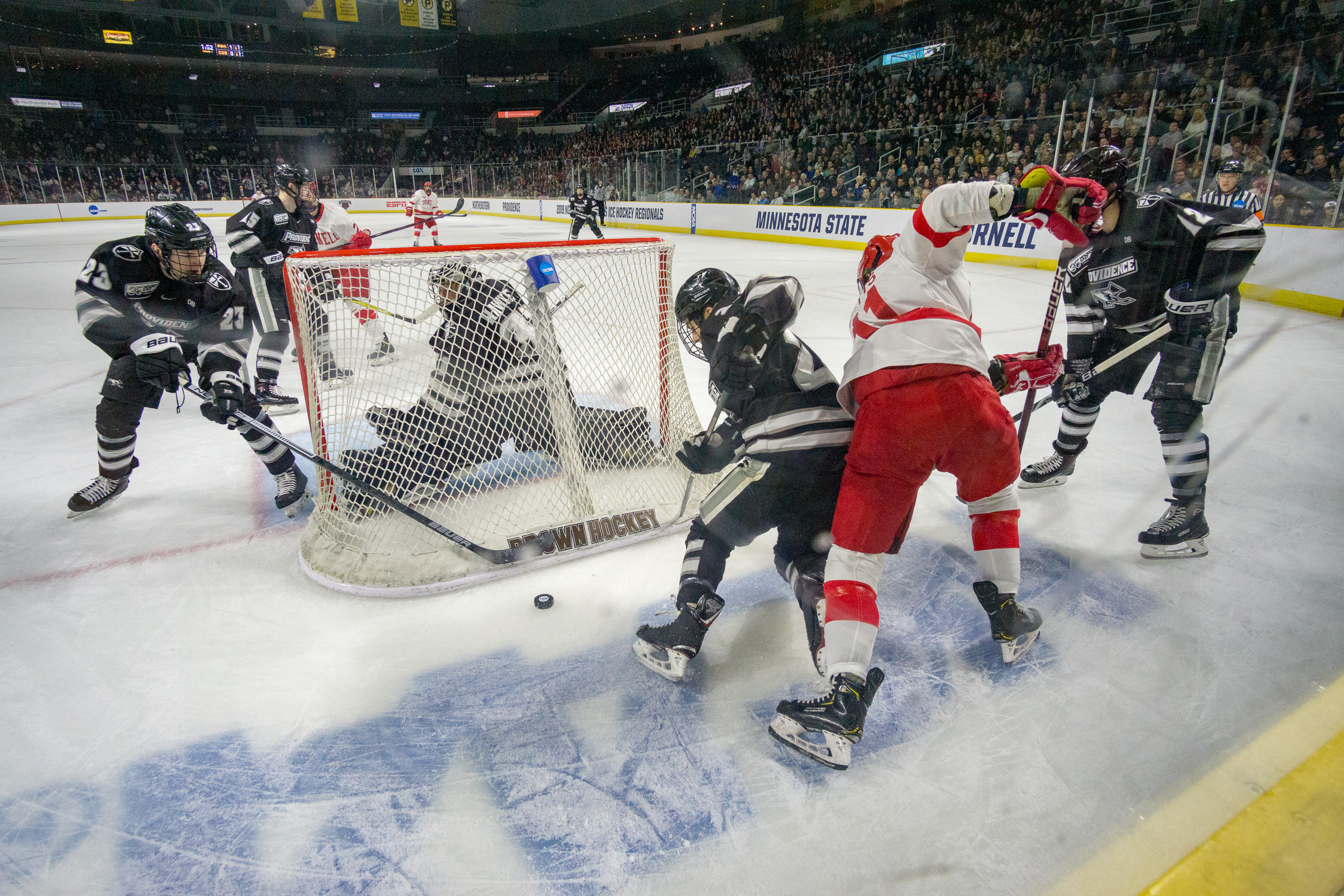
Playing Cornell University at the Dunkin' Donuts Center in 2019

The school's 19 varsity men's and women's sports teams are called the Friars, after the Dominican Catholic order that runs the school. They are the only collegiate team to use that team name. All teams participate in the NCAA Division I and in the Big East Conference, except for the men's and women's ice hockey programs, which compete in Hockey East. In 2015, the men's hockey team won its first NCAA Division I National Championship.

The team colors are black and white, the same as the Dominicans, with silver as an accent color. The school's current logos and identity marks were released in 2002, and feature the profile of a friar wearing the black cappa (hood) of the Dominicans, above the word mark. All teams use the primary logo except the hockey teams, which have used the "skating Friar" logo since 1973. In addition to the Friar mascot, the school's animal mascot was a Dalmatian named "Friar Boy." The school's closest rivalries are Boston University and Boston College in hockey and the University of Connecticut and the University of Rhode Island in the school's other sports, especially in soccer, tennis, swimming and diving, and basketball. Providence College once had a well-respected intercollegiate football team: two former students played professional football for the New York Football Giants (Charles Avedisian and Hank Soar). The Providence Friars football program was discontinued in 1941.

=== Men's basketball ===
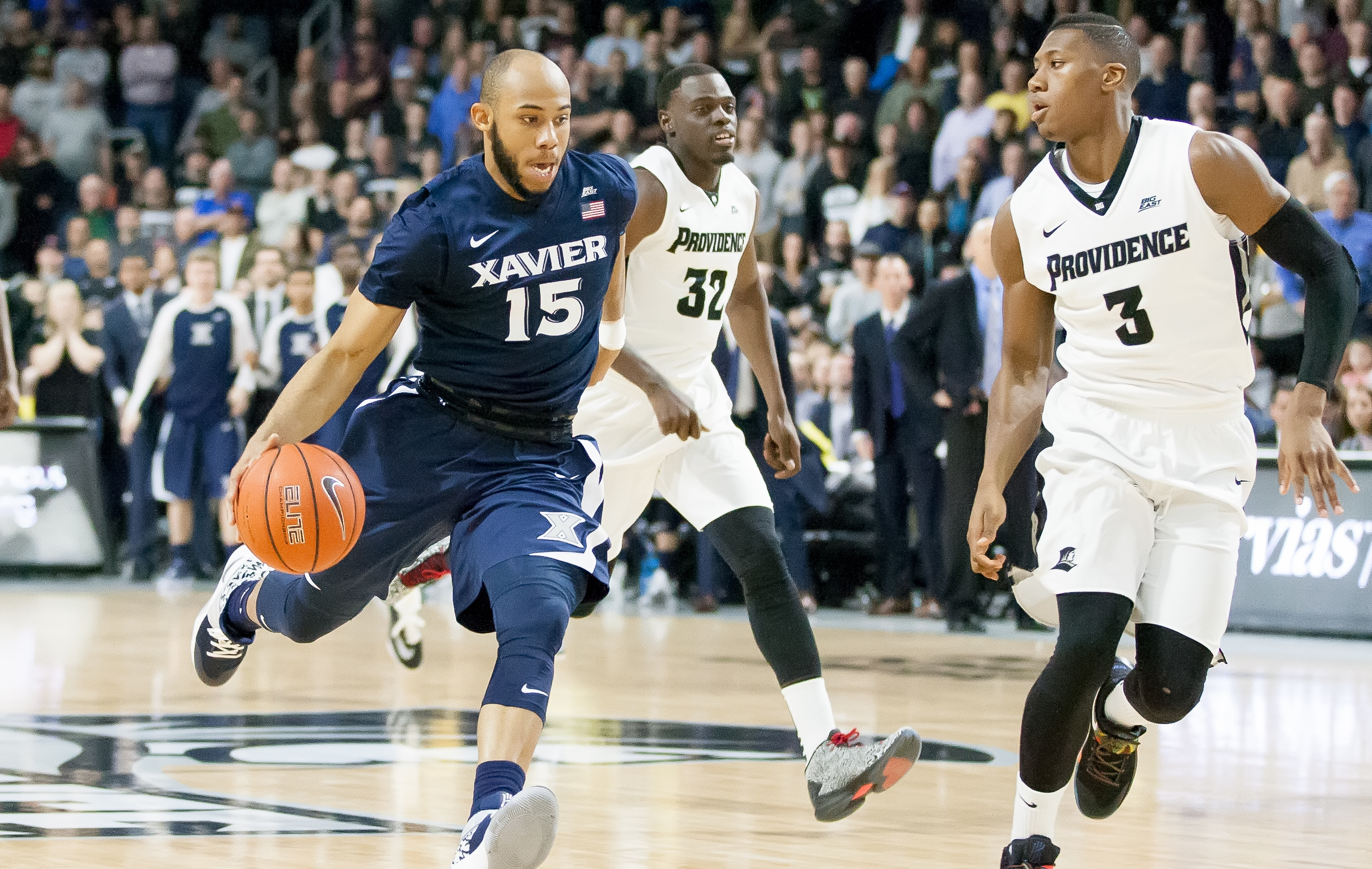
Xavier University playing Providence College at the Dunkin' Donuts Center in 2016

The Friars men's basketball team is an original member of the Big East Conference, which was created in 1979 by a group led by former Providence coach Dave Gavitt and headquartered in Providence. The Friars play their home games at the 13,000-seat Amica Mutual Pavilion in downtown Providence, a facility that underwent an $80 million renovation completed in 2008. Despite having the smallest enrollment of any Big East Conference school, the Friars have routinely averaged over 10,000 fans per game during the 30-plus year history of the facility, all while earning postseason berths and placing many players in the National Basketball Association. In addition to producing NBA players, former Friars players and coaches have also gone on to become basketball icons in the coaching world, such as Rick Pitino, Billy Donovan, Lenny Wilkens, Pete Gillen, Rick Barnes, Johnny Egan, and John Thompson. They were coached by Ed Cooley from 2011 to 2023.

Providence College won the 1961 and 1963 NIT championship and participated in the 1973 and 1987 Final Four, and the 1965 and 1997 squads advanced to the NCAA Elite Eight. Overall, the team has earned 19 NCAA basketball tournament berths and 18 NIT berths, as well as having numerous players named All-Americans.

== Marks and seals ==
The college's graphic identity represents the shape of a window in Harkins Hall with a flame inside, representing Veritas, or Truth, the official college motto. The college motto was borrowed from the Dominican Order, and has been used since the college's inception.

The official seal of Providence College is an ornate triangle, representing the Trinity, with the flame of learning and a scroll with the College Motto, Veritas, superimposed on it. The seal is surrounded by a ring with the words Sigillum Collegii Providentiensis ("Seal of Providence College") inside it.

== Notable alumni ==
A number of prominent local and national politicians and judges are Providence College alumni. Former United States Senator from Connecticut Chris Dodd graduated in 1966 with a Bachelor of Arts degree in English literature, while his father, Thomas J. Dodd, also a long-serving U.S. Senator from Connecticut, graduated in 1930 with a degree in philosophy. Former United States Representative from Rhode Island Patrick J. Kennedy, the son of former United States Senator Ted Kennedy, earned a Bachelor of Science degree in 1991.

In addition, 1963 graduate and star basketball player Raymond Flynn (Class of 1963) earned a Bachelor of Arts degree in education–social studies before serving as a three-term Mayor of Boston and the United States Ambassador to the Holy See. Six-term Mayor of Chicago Richard M. Daley graduated in 1964 from Providence College. Former United States Attorney General, United States Senator from Rhode Island, and Governor of Rhode Island J. Howard McGrath was a 1926 graduate of the college.

In athletics, two Basketball Hall of Fame players or coaches have graduated from Providence College: Lenny Wilkens and John Thompson. In ice hockey, Olympic champion goalie Sara DeCosta, played for Providence as well as current NHL forward Brandon Tanev. As well as this, Inter Miami footballer and 2018 MLS Cup winner Julian Gressel graduated from Providence College. In addition, two-time NCAA Division I men's basketball tournament champion, former University of Florida men's basketball and current Chicago Bulls head coach Billy Donovan (Class of 1987), graduated from Providence College. Former Big East Conference commissioner John Marinatto (Class of 1979) is a Providence College graduate, while former Toronto Maple Leafs general manager Brian Burke (Class of 1977), former New Jersey Devils CEO/President and former Toronto Maple Leafs general manager and current New York Islander general manager Lou Lamoriello (Class of 1963), and Boston Celtics president Rich Gotham (Class of 1986) are also alumni.

Actors John O'Hurley (Class of 1976), Matt Kinback (Class of 2007), film directors Peter Farrelly (Class of 1979) and James O'Brien (Class of 1992), Arn Chorn-Pond, actress and comedian Janeane Garofalo (Class of 1986) are graduates of Providence College, as are ESPN NBA and college basketball commentator Doris Burke (Class of 1987), and sports journalist Sean McAdam (Class of 1981).

== See also ==
- Catholic school
- Catholic university
- List of Rhode Island schools
