= Tillinghast Licht =

Rhode Island law firm (1818–2008)

- Headquarters: Providence, Rhode Island
- No. of offices: 1
- Major practice areas: General Practice
- Date founded: 1818
- Founder: Charles Tillinghast
- Company type: Limited liability partnership
- Dissolved: 2008
- Website: www.tllaw.com

Tillinghast Licht LLP was a Providence, Rhode Island–based law firm, from 1818 to 2008. Established in 1818 by Charles Foster Tillinghast, Sr., a scion of one of the oldest families in Rhode Island, it was one of the oldest law firms in Rhode Island.

In 1816, Tillinghast was admitted to the Rhode Island bar and opened his first office, in the village of Chepachet. The following year, he returned to Providence and partnered with Samuel W. Bridgham, under whom he had studied at Brown University. Six years later, Tillinghast opened his own office.

In 1842, Tillinghast partnered with Charles S. Bradley, who would later become Rhode Island's chief justice. In 1843, Tillinghast represented Providence for a single term in the Rhode Island General Assembly. Tillinghast & Bradley was well known in Rhode Island until the firm dissolved in 1858. At that time, Tillinghast and his son James, who had joined the firm in 1851, continued as Tillinghast & Tillinghast. That name would continue after Charles died in 1864 and James continued to practice with his sons, William Richmond and Theodore Foster Tillinghast.

In the early 20th century, with William Tillinghast still a member of the firm, Tillinghast & Tillinghast merged with another firm to form Tillinghast & Collins. It was the first of several mergers in the last century, all that saw the Tillinghast name remain preeminent. Between 1913 and 1916, later famous civil liberties advocate Zechariah Chafee practiced for Tillinghast & Collins.

In the 1970s, Tillinghast, Collins & Tanner joined with Graham, Reid, Ewing & Stapleton. In the 1990s, Tillinghast Collins & Graham merged with Licht & Semonoff to form Tillinghast Licht & Semonoff. The name was later shortened to Tillinghast Licht. In 2000, it merged with the Boston firm of Perkins Smith & Cohen and called its Rhode Island office Tillinghast Licht Perkins Smith & Cohen, but the firms split only a few years later, and Tillinghast Licht returned to its former name.

In May 2008, Tillinghast Licht announced that it will wind down business in the next few months, with six key lawyers joining Adler Pollock & Sheehan.

== Notable attorneys ==
- Charles S. Bradley, former Rhode Island chief justice
- Zechariah Chafee, influential legal scholar
- Joseph DeAngelis, former House Speaker
- Richard A. Licht, former Lieutenant Governor of Rhode Island
- Patrick C. Lynch, attorney general of Rhode Island
- Joseph W. Walsh, former mayor of Warwick, Rhode Island
