= Charles Foster Tillinghast Jr. =

Charles Foster Tillinghast Jr. (November 11, 1913 – July 22, 1995) was a yachtsman and naval officer. He was the son of Charles Foster Tillinghast Sr. He was born in Providence, Rhode Island and was the scion of a prominent family in Rhode Island history which traces its history to the early days of the colony.

He was the 1936 winner of the Blue Water Medal for "the finest feat of seamanship accomplished by an amateur yachtsman".

On June 8, 1935 the yacht Hamrah left Newport, Rhode Island heading for Bergen, Norway in a transatlantic crossing race. On board was a crew of six including Robert R. Ames (1883–1935) as the owner and yacht master; and his son Richard Ames (1912–1935). Tillinghast attempted to save the three members of the crew that fell overboard in the North Atlantic.

Tillinghast joined the Naval Reserve on June 18, 1936 and served active duty during World War II. He survived the sinking of the cruiser USS Vincennes in the Battle of Savo Island in 1942. He was promoted to lieutenant commander on July 1, 1943. He was the first commanding officer of the destroyer escort USS Weeden when she was commissioned on February 19, 1944 and commanded her in the latter stages of the war. The Weeden saw service in both the Atlantic and Pacific oceans and participated in the Liberation of the Philippines. Tillinghast relinquished command of the Weeden on December 18, 1945.

== Awards ==
- American Defense Service Medal
- American Campaign Medal
- Asiatic-Pacific Campaign Medal with two battle stars
- European-African-Middle Eastern Campaign Medal
- World War II Victory Medal
- Navy Occupation Medal
- Philippine Liberation Medal
