= Charles Foster Tillinghast Sr. =

Charles Foster Tillinghast Sr. (September 18, 1871 – October 3, 1948) was a business executive, yachtsman and a National Guard officer who held the rank of colonel during World War I. He was the father of Charles Foster Tillinghast Jr.

== Early life ==
He was born 18 September 1871 to James Tillinghast (1828–1914) and Sarah Benson (née, Anthony) Tillinghast (1832–1895). He was named after his grandfather Charles Foster Tillinghast (1797–1864) and was a descendant of Rhode Island colonial governor Stephen Hopkins who was a signer of the Declaration of Independence.

He graduated from the Mowry and Goff School in Providence in 1891 and from the Massachusetts Institute of Technology in 1895. After graduation, he was employed by the Textile-Finishing Machinery Company of Providence from which he retired in 1941 as vice president and managing director.

== Military service ==
Tillinghast was active in the Rhode Island Militia and National Guard. He was commissioned in the Rhode Island Militia as a 2nd lieutenant on June 18, 1896. He was promoted to captain on December 29 of the same year. On May 20, 1898, he volunteered for active duty as a captain and served as commander of Company A of the 1st Rhode Island Infantry during the Spanish–American War. He was stationed with the regiment in Virginia, Pennsylvania and South Carolina but was not deployed overseas. He was mustered out of service, along with the regiment, on March 30, 1899, and returned to Rhode Island on April 1.

In 1902 he became captain of the 2nd Company of the 1st Infantry Regiment of the Rhode Island Militia. He was elected as the lieutenant colonel for the Rhode Island Coast Artillery District on October 20, 1908.

Tillinghast became colonel in command of the Coast Artillery District of Rhode Island on May 28, 1909. During World War I, he was called into Federal service on July 25, 1917, and commanded Fort Greble on Dutch Island in the West Passage of Narragansett Bay in Rhode Island. He was demobilized in December 1918 and retired from the Rhode Island National Guard on April 8, 1919. Upon his retirement, he was promoted to brigadier general with a date of rank of August 5, 1917.

=== Military awards ===
- Spanish War Service Medal
- World War I Victory Medal (United States)
- Rhode Island Militia Service Medal
- Rhode Island Spanish War Service Medal

== Yachting ==
He was an avid yachtsman and won the Lipton Cup in 1904 in an ocean yacht race from Montauk Point to Marblehead, Massachusetts in his 35-foot yacht Little Rhody.

== Memberships ==
In 1899 he became a member of the Rhode Island Society of the Sons of the American Revolution by right of being the third great grandson of Stephen Hopkins who was Governor of Rhode Island, a member of the Continental Congress and a signer of the Declaration of Independence. He was also a member of the Society of Colonial Wars, Military Order of Foreign Wars, General Society of Mayflower Descendants, Rhode Island Historical Society, Agawam Hunt and the Hope Club. In 1924 he became the founding president of the Rhode Island chapter of the Reserve Officers Association.

== Death ==
He died on October 2, 1948, and was buried in Swan Point Cemetery in Providence.
