= William Clifford Newman =

American clergyman

His Excellency, The Most Reverend William Clifford Newman
- Auxiliary Bishop of Baltimore; Titular Bishop of Numluli
- Archdiocese: Baltimore
- Appointed: May 25, 1984
- Installed: July 2, 1984
- Term ended: August 28, 2003
- Other post: Titular Bishop of Numluli

Orders
- Ordination: May 29, 1954 by Francis Patrick Keough
- Consecration: July 2, 1984 by William Donald Borders, Thomas Austin Murphy, and Eugene Antonio Marino

Personal details
- Born: August 16, 1928 Baltimore, Maryland
- Died: May 20, 2017 (aged 88) Timonium, Maryland
- Education: St. Charles College; St. Mary's Seminary; Catholic University of America; Loyola College

Styles of William Clifford Newman
- Reference style: His Excellency; The Most Reverend
- Spoken style: Your Excellency
- Religious style: Bishop

William Clifford Newman (August 16, 1928 – May 20, 2017) was an American prelate of the Roman Catholic Church in the United States. He served as an auxiliary bishop of the Archdiocese of Baltimore in Maryland from 1984 to 2003.

== Biography ==
=== Early life ===
William Newman was born on August 16, 1928, in Baltimore, Maryland. After graduating from Calvert Hall High School in 1946, he decided to enter the priesthood. He then attend St. Charles College in Catonsville, Maryland, and earned a Bachelor of Arts degree from St. Mary's Seminary in Baltimore in 1950. That same year, Newman entered the Catholic University of America (CUA) in Washington, D.C. He was awarded a Licentiate of Sacred Theology in 1954.

=== Priesthood ===
Newman was ordained to the priesthood by Archbishop Francis Patrick Keough for the Archdiocese of Baltimore on May 29, 1954. After his ordination, the archdiocese assigned Newman as assistant pastor at St. Elizabeth Parish in Baltimore.

In 1962, Newman left St. Elizabeth to serve as the first principal of St. Paul Latin High School in Baltimore. He was raised to the rank of papal chamberlain by Pope Paul VI in June 1965. That same year, he received a Masters in Education, Administration and Supervision degree from Loyola College in Baltimore.In 1967, Archbishop Lawrence Shehan named Newman as superintendent of Catholic schools in the archdiocese. He was appointed as secretary of education for the archdiocese in 1972.

Newman returned to pastoral work in 1976 when he was appointed pastor of SS. Philip and James Parish. In 1981, he was appointed rector of the Cathedral of Mary Our Queen in Baltimore.

=== Auxiliary Bishop of Baltimore ===
On May 25, 1984, Newman was appointed an auxiliary bishop for Baltimore and titular Bishop of Numluli by Pope John Paul II. He received his episcopal ordination at the Cathedral of Mary Our Queen on July 2, 1984 from Archbishop William Borders, with Bishops Thomas Murphy and Eugene Marino serving as co-consecrators.

As an auxiliary bishop, he served as vicar general of the archdiocese and episcopal vicar for the Eastern Vicariate of the archdiocese, which comprised Harford, Baltimore and Anne Arundel counties.

Within the United States Conference of Catholic Bishops, he served as a member of the Committees on Education, Religious Life and Ministry, and on Women in the Church and Society. He also has represented the U.S. bishops in the Catholic-Jewish Consultations under the Committee on Interreligious and Ecumenical Affairs. In 1997, he was elected to the board of directors of Catholic Relief Services.

=== Retirement and death ===
After reaching the mandatory retirement age of 75, Newman resigned as auxiliary bishop of Baltimore on August 28, 2003. He died in hospice in Timonium, Maryland, on May 20, 2017, at age 88.

== See also ==
- Catholic Church hierarchy
- Catholic Church in the United States
- Historical list of the Catholic bishops of the United States
- List of Catholic bishops of the United States
- Lists of patriarchs, archbishops, and bishops
