= Philip Francis Murphy =

American clergyman

His Excellency, The Most Reverend Philip Francis Murphy
- Church: Roman Catholic Church
- Archdiocese: Archdiocese of Baltimore
- In office: 1976-1999

Orders
- Ordination: December 20, 1958 by Martin John O'Connor
- Consecration: February 29, 1976 by William Donald Borders

Personal details
- Born: March 25, 1933 Cumberland, Maryland, USA
- Died: September 2, 1999 (aged 66) Baltimore, Maryland, USA
- Buried: Cathedral of Mary Our Queen, Baltimore
- Education: St. Charles College; St. Mary's Seminary; Pontifical Gregorian University

Philip Francis Murphy (March 25, 1933 – September 2, 1999) was an American prelate of the Roman Catholic Church in the United States. He served as an auxiliary bishop of the Archdiocese of Baltimore in Maryland from 1976 until his death in 1999.

== Early life and education ==
Philip Murphy was born March 25, 1933, in Cumberland, Maryland, to Philip and Kathleen (née Huth) Murphy. He received his early education at the parochial school of St. Mary's Parish in Cumberland. After graduating from high school, he attended St. Charles College in Catonsville. He made his theological studies at St. Mary's Seminary in Baltimore, from where he obtained a Bachelor of Arts degree in 1955. He continued his studies at the Pontifical North American College in Rome, and earned a Licentiate of Sacred Theology from the Pontifical Gregorian University in 1959.

== Priesthood ==
While in Rome, Murphy was ordained to the priesthood by Bishop Martin John O'Connor on December 20, 1958. Upon his return to the United States, he was appointed curate at St. Bernardine Parish and vocation director at Mount St. Joseph High School, both in Baltimore.

Murphy returned to Rome in 1961 to become assistant vice-rector at the North American College; the Vatican named him a papal chamberlain in 1965. After coming back to Baltimore, Cardinal Lawrence Shehan appointed Murphy as his secretary. In addition to his duties as secretary, he was named vice-chancellor of the archdiocese in 1968, and chancellor of pastoral concerns and vicar for personnel in 1971.

== Auxiliary Bishop of Baltimore ==
On January 11, 1976, Murphy was appointed as an auxiliary bishop of Baltimore and titular bishop of Tacarata by Pope Paul VI. He received his episcopal consecration on February 29, 1976, from Archbishop William Donald Borders at the Cathedral of Mary Our Queen in Baltimore, with Shehan and Bishop Thomas Austin Murphy serving as co-consecrators. In addition to his episcopal duties, he served as vicar general of the archdiocese and vicar to Catholics in Maryland's western counties of Howard, Carroll, Frederick, Washington, Allegany, and Garrett.

Active in interfaith dialogue, Murphy worked improve relations between Catholics and Jews. He served as a board member of the Interfaith Alliance, an organization of Christian and Jewish leaders from across the nation. In 1989, he co-founded Interfaith Housing of Western Maryland, an organization dedicated to developing safe and adequate housing for Western Maryland's rural poor. Within the National Conference of Catholic Bishops, Murphey served as a member of the Doctrine Committee (1976 – 1979), the Priestly Life & Ministry Committee (1976 – 1982), the Pastoral Research & Practices Committee (1976 – 1980), the Vocations Committee (1977 – 1980) and the Committee on Women in Society and in the Church (1978 – 1990).

== Death ==
Murphy died from cancer on September 2, 1999 at Mercy Medical Center in Baltimore at age 66. He is buried in the crypt of the Cathedral of Mary Our Queen.

Catholic Church titles
Preceded by –	Auxiliary Bishop of Baltimore; 1976–1999	Succeeded by –
