= List of churches in the Archdiocese of Baltimore =

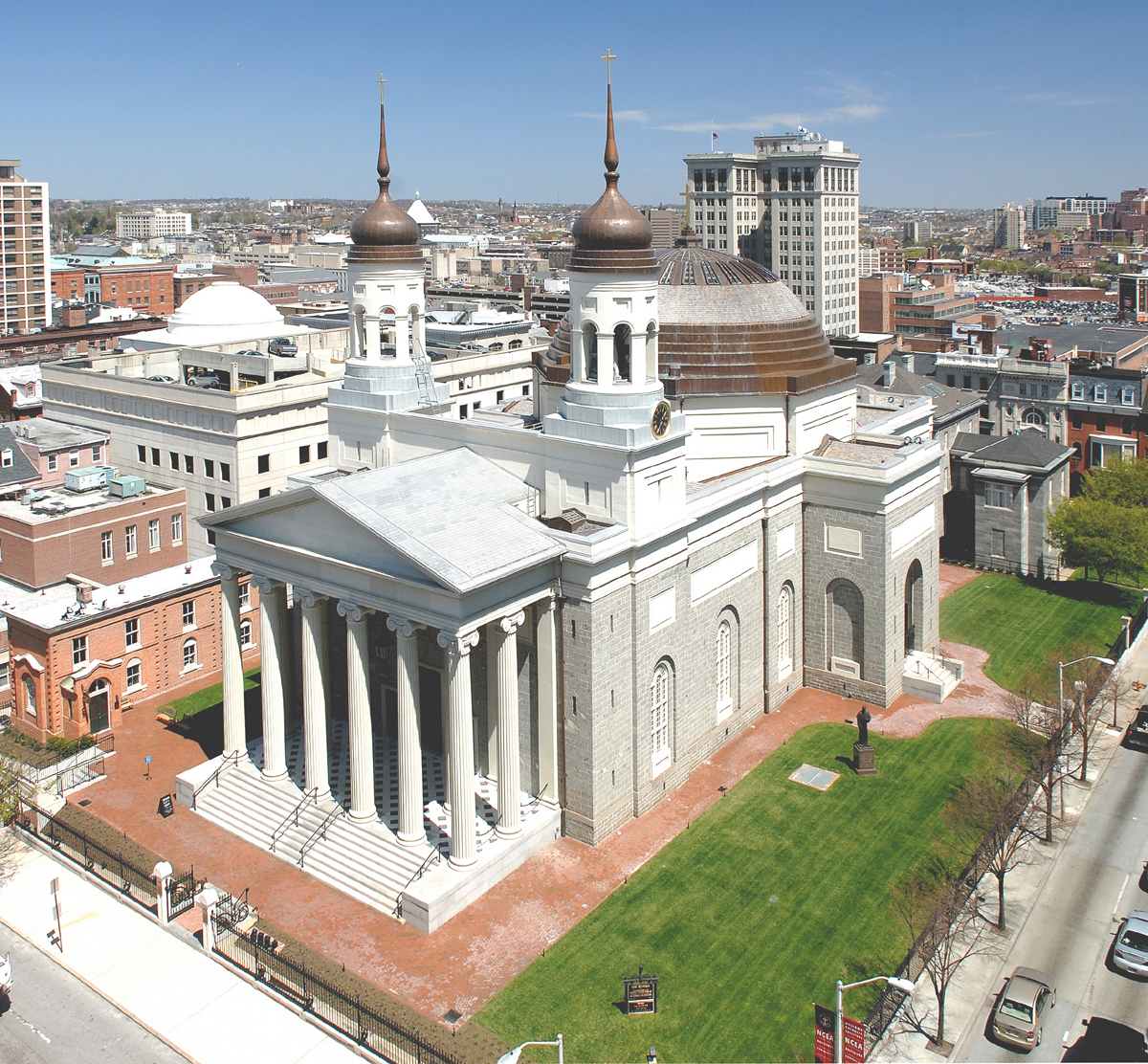
Basilica of the National Shrine of the Assumption of the Blessed Virgin Mary

This is a list of current and former Catholic churches of the Archdiocese of Baltimore. As of 2024, the archdiocese had 153 active parishes and missions.

The archdiocese covers Baltimore and nine counties in central and western Maryland: Allegany, Anne Arundel, Baltimore, Carroll, Frederick, Garrett, Harford, Howard, and Washington.

The cathedral church of the archdiocese is the Cathedral of Mary Our Queen, consecrated in Baltimore in 1959. The archdiocese also includes the Basilica of the National Shrine of the Assumption of the Blessed Virgin Mary, built in Baltimore between 1806 and 1863, based on a design by Benjamin Henry Latrobe.

As the home to the first American-born saint, Elizabeth Ann Seton, the archdiocese also includes several sites associated with her life and works:

- National Shrine of St. Elizabeth Ann Seton in Emmitsburg, the site of Seton's tomb
- Lower chapel at St. Mary's Seminary in Baltimore, where Seton gave her vows of chastity and poverty in 1808
- Mother Seton House at St. Mary's Seminary, where she lived from 1808 to 1809.

== City of Baltimore ==
Some churches with Baltimore street addresses are listed by the archdiocese as being in Baltimore County.

Name	Image	Location	Description/sources
Cathedral of Mary Our Queen		5200 N. Charles St, Baltimore	Consecrated in 1959
Catholic Community of South Baltimore		Holy Cross Church, 110 E. West St, Baltimore	Founded as mission in 1858, church dedicated in 1860. Now part of the Catholic Community of South Baltimore
		Our Lady of Good Counsel Church	Founded as mission in 1885, church dedicated in 1889. Now part of the Catholic Community of South Baltimore
		St. Mary Star of the Sea Church, 1400 Riverside Ave, Baltimore	Founded in 1871 for Irish immigrants, church dedicated that same year. Now part of Catholic Community of South Baltimore
Community of St. Athanasius and St. Rose of Lima		St. Athanasius Church, 4708 Prudence St, Baltimore	Founded in 1892, Now merged with St. Rose of Lima Parish
		St. Rose of Lima Church, 3803 Fourth St, Baltimore	Founded in 1914, church dedicated in 1916. Now merged with St. Athanasius Parish
Corpus Christi		110 W. Lafayette Ave, Baltimore	First Corpus Christi Church in the United States. Founded in 1880, church consecrated in 1891.
Epiphany Catholic Community		St. Anthony of Padua Church, 4414 Frankford Ave, Baltimore	Now part of Epiphany Catholic Community
		St. Dominic Church, 5302 Harford Rd, Baltimore	Now part of Epiphany Catholic Community
		Most Precious Blood Church, 5010 Bowleys Ln, Baltimore	Founded in 1948. Now part of Epiphany Catholic Community
Historic Pastorate Community		St. Ann Church, 528 E. 22nd St, Baltimore	Church dedicated in 1874. Now part of the Historic Pastorate Community
		St. Wenceslaus Church, 2111 Ashland Ave, Baltimore	Founded in the 1790s as the first Black parish in the United States, church dedicated in 1864. Now part of the Historic Pastorate Community
		St. Francis Xavier Church, 1501 East Oliver St, Baltimore,	Founded in 1871 for Black immigrants. Now part of the Historic Pastorate Community
Holy Rosary		408 S. Chester St, Baltimore	Founded in 1887 for Polish immigrants, church started in 1927
Immaculate Conception		1512 Druid Hill Ave, Baltimore	Established in 1850.
Mount Calvary		816 N. Eutaw St, Baltimore	Founded in 1842. Under the Personal Ordinariate of the Chair of St. Peter as an Anglican-Use community
New All Saints		4408 Liberty Heights Ave, Baltimore	Merger of Our Lady of Lourdes and All Saints Parishes
Our Lady of Fatima		6400 East Pratt St, Baltimore	Founded as a mission church in 1951
Our Lady of Pompei		3600 Claremont St, Baltimore	Founded in 1923 for Italian immigrants, church dedicated in 1924
Pastorate of St. Casimir		St. Casimir Church, 2736 O'Donnell St, Baltimore	Founded in 1904, church dedicated in 1926. Now merged with St. Elizabeth of Hungary Parish
		St. Elizabeth of Hungary Church, 2638 E. Baltimore St, Baltimore	Established in 1895, church dedicated in 1912. Now merged with St. Casimir Parish.
Sacred Heart of Jesus-St. Patrick		Sacred Heart of Jesus Church, 600 South Conkling St, Baltimore	Founded in 1878 for German immigrants, church dedicated in 1911. Now merged with St. Patrick
		St. Patrick Church, 319 S. Broadway, Baltimore	Founded in 1792, oldest parish in Baltimore. Now merged with Sacred Heart of Jesus Parish
Sacred Heart of Mary		6736 Youngstown Ave, Baltimore	Combined with St. Rita
SS. Philip & James		2801 North Charles St, Baltimore	Founded in 2010, serves Johns Hopkins University students
St. Ambrose		4502 Park Heights Ave, Baltimore	Founded in the 1920s, church dedicated in 1947
St. Benedict		2612 Wilkens Ave, Baltimore	Founded in 1893, church dedicated in 1933
St. Bernardine		3812 Edmondson Ave, Baltimore	Founded in 1928, church dedicated in the 1920s
St. Cecelia		3300 Clifton Ave, Baltimore	
St. Edward		901 Poplar Grove St, Baltimore	
St. Francis of Assisi		3615 Harford Rd, Baltimore	Merged with the Shrine of the Little Flower
St. Gregory the Great		1542 North Gilmor St, Baltimore	Founded in 1883, church dedicated in 1886
St. Ignatius		740 N. Calvert St, Baltimore	
St. Leo		227 S. Exeter St, Baltimore	Established in 1881
St. Mary's Seminary Chapel		600 N. Paca St, Baltimore	
St. Matthew and Blessed Sacrament		Blessed Sacrament Church, 4103 Old York Rd, Baltimore	Combined with St. Matthew Parish
		St. Matthew Church, 5401 Loch Raven Blvd, Baltimore	Founded in 1949, church dedicated in 1962
St. Peter Claver-St. Pius V		1546 North Fremont Ave, Baltimore	Church dedicated in 1888. Now merged with St. Pius V
Ss. Philip and James		2801 N. Charles St, Baltimore	Church dedicated in 1930
St. Thomas Aquinas		1008 W. 37th St, Baltimore	Founded in 1867
St. Thomas More		6806 McClean Blvd, Baltimore	Founded in 1862, now merged with Immaculate Heart of Mary
St. Veronica		806 Cherry Hill Rd, Baltimore	Founded in 1946, church dedicated in 1955
St. Vincent de Paul		120 N. Front St, Baltimore	
St. William of York		600 Cooks Ln, Baltimore	Merged with St. Agnes Parish
Transfiguration Catholic Community		775 W. Hamburg St, Baltimore	Founded in 2004 with the merger of St. Peter the Apostle, St. Martin of Tours and St. Jerome Parishes

== Allegany County ==
Name	Image	Location	Description/sources
Divine Mercy		St. Gabriel Church, GXHM+W6, Barton	Now part of Divine Mercy Parish
		St. Joseph Church, 19925 Church St, Midland	Founded in 1891, church dedicated in 1967. Now part of Divine Mercy Parish
		St. Michael Church, 44 E. Main St, Frostburg	Founded in 1869, now part of Divine Mercy Parish
		St. Peter Church, 127 Church St #1438, Westernport	Founded in 1851, church dedicated in 1908. Now part of Divine Mercy Parish
Our Lady of the Mountains		St. Mary of the Immaculate Conception Church 300 E. Oldtown Rd, Cumberland	Church dedicated in 1928. Now part of Our Lady of the Mountains Parish
		Shrine of Saints Peter and Paul Parish, 125 Fayette St, Cumberland	Founded in 1848. Now part of Our Lady of the Mountains Parish
		St. Patrick Church, 201 N. Centre St, Cumberland	Founded in 1791. Now part of Our Lady of the Mountains Parish
Ss. Peter and Patrick		St. Patrick Church, 12517 Saint Patrick Road, SE, Little Orleans	Church dedicated in 1860. Now merged with St Peter Church

== Anne Arundel County ==
Name	Image	Location	Description/sources
Holy Family		826 W. Central Ave, Davidsonville	Founded in 1982
Our Lady of the Fields		1070 Cecil Ave. S, Millersville	Founded in 1965, church dedicated in 1957
Pastorate of Christ the King and St. Bernadette		St. Bernadette Church, 801 Stevenson Rd, Severn	Founded in 1972, merged with Christ the King Parish
		Christ the King Church, 7436 B & A Blvd, Glen Burnie	Founded in 2017, merged with St. Bernadette
Pastorate of Our Lady		Our Lady of Perpetual Help Church, 4795 Ilchester Rd, Ellicott City	Founded in 1893, merged with Our Lady of Sorrows
		Our Lady of Sorrows Church, 101 Owensville Rd, West River	Founded in 1927, church consecrated in 1959. Merged with Our Lady of Perpetual Help
Pastorate of the Visitation		St. Jane Frances de Chantal Church, 8499 Virginia Ave, Pasadena	Founded in 1946, church dedicated in 1945. Now merged with Our Lady of the Chesapeake Parish
		Our Lady of the Chesapeake Church, 8325 Ventnor Rd, Pasadena	Founded in 1980, church dedicated in 1986. Now merged with St. Jane Frances de Chantal Parish
Resurrection of Our Lord		8402 Brock Bridge Rd, Laurel	Founded in 1968, church dedicated in 1970
St. Andrew by the Bay		701 College Pkwy, Annapolis	
St. Elizabeth Ann Seton		1800 Seton Dr, Crofton	Founded in 1976, church dedicated in 1981
St. John the Evangelist		689 Ritchie Hwy, Severna Park	Church dedicated in 2018
St. Joseph		1283 Odenton Rd. Odenton	Founded in 1924, church dedicated in 1980
St. Lawrence Martyr		7850 Parkside Blvd, Hanover	Founded in 1921, church dedicated in 2017 on the site of the former Blob's Park
St. Mary		109 Duke of Gloucester St, Annapolis	Founded in 1853
		St. John Neumann Mission, 620 N. Bestgate Rd, Annapolis	Operated by St. Mary Parish

== Baltimore County ==
Name	Image	Location	Description/sources
Catholic Community of Ascension and St Augustine		Church of the Ascension, 4603 Poplar Ave, Baltimore	Founded as mission in 1913, church dedicated in 1927. Now merged with St. Augustine Parish.
Holy Family		9531 Liberty Rd, Randallstown	
Holy Korean Martyrs		5801 Security Blvd, Baltimore	Founded in 1989 as the first Korean parish in the United States.
Immaculate Conception		200 Ware Ave, Towson	Founded in 1880s, church dedicated in 1904
Immaculate Heart of Mary		8501 Loch Raven Blvd, Towson	Founded in 1948, church dedicated in 1950
MAC Pastorate		St. Clement Mary Hofbauer Church, 1212 Chesaco Ave, Rosedale	Founded in the 1920s, church dedicated in 1925. Now part of the MAC Pastorate
		Church of the Annunciation, 5212 McCormick Ave, Baltimore	Founded in 1948, now part of the MAC Pastorate
		St. Michael the Archangel Church, 10 Willow Ave, Baltimore	Church started in 1914, now part of the MAC Pastorate
Church of the Nativity		20 East Ridgely Rd, Timonium	Founded in 1968. Church dedicated in 2017
Our Lady of the Angels		711 Maiden Choice Ln, Catonsville	Chapel constructed in 1913 at St. Charles College, now a retirement community
Our Lady of Grace		18310 Middletown Rd, Parkton	Founded in 1974
Our Lady of Hope		1727 Lynch Rd, Baltimore	Founded in 1967 with the merging of St. Mildred and St. Adrian Parishes. Now combined with St. Luke Parish
Our Lady of LaVang		335 Sollers Point Rd, Baltimore	
Our Lady of Mount Carmel		1704 Old Eastern Ave, Baltimore	Founded in the late 1800s, dedicated in 1938. Combined with St. Clare Parish.
Our Lady, Queen of Peace		10003 Bird River Rd, Baltimore	Founded in 1953, church started in 1957
Our Lady of Victory		4414 Wilkens Ave, Baltimore	Founded in 1952, church dedicated in 1957
Sacred Heart		63 Sacred Heart Ln, Glyndon	Founded in 1946, church dedicated in 1993
St. Agnes		5422 Old Frederick Rd, Baltimore	Combined with St. William of York Parish
St. Alphonsus Rodriguez		10800 Old Court Rd, Woodstock	Founded in 1869, church dedicated in 1971
St. Charles Borromeo		101 Church Ln, Pikesville	Founded in 1848. Church dedicated in 1898
St. Clare		714 Myrth Ave, Baltimore	Founded in 1909, church dedicated in 1930. Merged with Our Lady of Mount Carmel Parish
St. Clement		2700 Washington Ave, Baltimore	Founded as a mission in 1891, Merged with St. Philip Neri Parish
St. Francis Xavier		13717 Cuba Rd, Hunt Valley	Founded in 1992
St. Gabriel		6950 Dogwood Rd, Baltimore	
St. Isaac Jogues		9215 Old Harford Rd, Baltimore	Founded in 1968, church dedicated in 1970
St. John the Evangelist		13305 Long Green Pike, Hydes	Mission established in early 1800s, parish founded in 1855. Church dedicated in 1969
St. Joseph		101 Church Ln, Cockeysville	
St. Joseph Fullerton		8420 Belair Rd, Baltimore	Founded in 1850, church dedicated in 1971
St. Luke		7517 North Point Rd, Baltimore	Founded in later 1880s, combined with Our Lady of Hope
St. Mark		30 Melvin Ave, Baltimore	Founded in the 1880s, church dedicated in 1889
St. Pius X		6428 York Rd, Baltimore	Founded in 1958, merged with St. Mary of the Assumption
St. Rita Church		3 Dunmanway Dr, Dundalk	Combined with Sacred Heart of Mary
St. Ursula		8801 Harford Rd, Baltimore	Founded in 1937, church dedicated in 1954

== Carroll County ==
Name	Image	Location	Description/sources
St. Bartholomew		2930 Hanover Pike,Manchester	Church dedicated in 2006
St. John		43 Monroe St,Westminster	
St. Joseph		915 Liberty Rd, Eldersburg	Founded in 1868
St. Joseph		44 Frederick St, Taneytown	Founded in 1797, church dedicated in 1876

== Frederick County ==
Name	Image	Location	Description/sources
Basilica of the National Shrine of St. Elizabeth Ann Seton		339 South Seton Ave, Emmitsburg	
Our Lady of Carmel		103 N. Church St, Thurmont	Founded as mission in 1856. Church dedicated in 1859. Now merged with St. Anthony Shrine
Pastorate of St. Francis, St. Mary, Holy Family		Holy Family Church, 7321 Burkittsville Rd, Middletown	Founded in 1989, church dedicated in 1997. Now merged with St. Mary Church.
		St. Mary Church, 4231 Catholic Church Rd, Petersville	Now merged with Holy Family Church.
St. Anthony Shrine		16150 St Anthony Rd #5, Emmitsburg	Founded as parish in 1894, church dedicated in 1897. Now merged with Our Lady of Mount Carmel Parish.
St. Francis of Assisi		Brunswick	
St. Ignatius of Loyola		4103 Prices Distillery Rd, Ijamsville	Church dedicated in 2000
St. John the Evangelist		118 E 2nd St, Frederick	Founded in 1763, church consecrated in 1912.
St. Joseph		47 Depaul St, Emmitsburg	Founded in the early 1800s, church dedicated in 1842
St. Joseph on Carrollton Manor		5843 Manor Woods Rd,Carrollton Manor	Founded in early 1800s, church dedicated in 2014
St. Katherine Drexel		8428 Oppossumtown Pike, Frederick	Founded in 2008, church dedicated in 2016
St. Peter the Apostle		9201 Green Valley Rd, Libertytown	Founded in early 1800s
St. Timothy		8651 Biggs Ford Rd, Walkersville	Founded as mission in 1980, church dedicated in 1997

== Garrett County ==
Name	Image	Location	Description/sources
St. Ann		12814 New Germany Rd, Grantsville	Founded in 1984, merged with St. Stephen Parish in 1977. Church dedicated in 2009. Now part of Divine Mercy Parish
St. Peter the Apostle		208 S. 4th St, Oakland	

== Harford County ==
Name	Image	Location	Description/sources
Holy Spirit		540 Joppa Farm Rd, Joppa	Founded in 1963, church dedicated in 1988. Merged with St. Stephen Bradshaw Parish
Pastorate of St. Francis de Sales and Prince of Peace		St. Francis de Sales Church, 1450 Abingdon Rd, Abingdon	Founded in 1964, church dedicated in 1992. Now merged with Prince of Peace Parish
		Prince of Peace Church, 2600 Willoughby Beach Rd, Edgewood	Founded in 1977, church dedicated in 1996. Now merged with St. Francis de Sales Parish
Pastorate of St. Patrick and St. Joan of Arc		St. Joan of Arc Church, 222 South Law St, Aberdeen	Founded in 1926. Now part of the Pastorate of St. Patrick and St. Joan of Arc
		St. Patrick Church, 615 Congress Ave, Havre de Grace	Founded in 1847, church started 1907. Now part of the Pastorate of St. Patrick and St. Joan of Arc
St. Ignatius		533 East Jarrettsville Rd, Forest Hill	Founded in 1792. Parish has the oldest church in continuous operation in the archdiocese.
St. John the Evangelist		13305 Long Green Pike, Hydes	
St. Margaret		141 Hickory Ave, Bel Air	Founded in early 1900s, church dedicated in 1969. Merged with St. Mary Magdalen Parish
		St. Mary Magdalen Mission, 1716 Churchville Rd, Bel Air	Merged with St. Mary Magdalen Parish
St. Mark		2407 Laurel Brook Rd, Fallston	Founded in 1968, church dedicated in 1990
St. Stephen Bradshaw		8030 Bradshaw Rd, Kingsville	Founded in 1866, church dedicated in 1890. Merged with Holy Spirit Parish

== Howard County ==
Name	Image	Location	Description/sources
Catholic Community of Ascension and St Augustine		St Augustine Church, 5976 Old Washington Rd, Elkridge	Founded in 1844, church dedicated in 1902. Now merged with Ascension Parish
Our Lady of Perpetual Help		4795 Ilchester Rd, Ellicott City	Founded in 1893
Resurrection		3175 Paulskirk Dr, Ellicott City	Founded in 1974, church dedicated in 1966. Now merged with St. Paul Parish
St. Francis of Assisi		8300 Old Columbia Rd, Fulton	Founded as mission in 1988, church dedicated in 1998
St. John the Evangelist		10431 Twin Rivers Rd, and 5885 Robert Oliver Pl, Columbia	Founded in 1967. Services held at Wilde Lake and Columbia Mills Interfaith Centers
St. Louis		12500 Clarksville Pike, Clarksville	Founded in 1855, church dedicated in 2006
St. Michael		1125 Saint Michael's Rd, Mount Airy	Founded as mission in 1882, new church started in 1982
St. Paul		3755 Saint Paul St, Ellicott City	Founded in 1820s, church dedicated in 1838. Now merged with Church of the Resurrections Parish

== Washington County ==
Name	Image	Location	Description/sources
St. Ann		1525 Oak Hill Ave. Hagerstown	Founded in 1966.
St. Augustine		32 E. Potomac St,Williamsport	Founded in 1856, church dedicated that same year. Part of the Catholic Parishes of South Washington County
St. James		121 N. Main St, Boonsboro	Founded in 2008, church dedicated in 1969. Part of the Catholic Parishes of South Washington County
St. Joseph		17630 Virginia Ave, Hagerstown	Founded in 1951, church dedicated that same year. Part of the Catholic Parishes of South Washington County
St. Mary		224 W. Washington St, Hagerstown	First Catholic parish in Hagerstown, church started in 1826
St. Michael		31 S. Martin St, Clear Spring	Clustered with St. Mary Parish
Ss. Peter and Patrick		St. Peter Church, 16 E. High St, Hancock	Church dedicated in 1835. Now part of Ss. Peter & Patrick Parish

== Shrines ==
Name	Image	Location	Description/sources
Basilica of the National Shrine of the Assumption of the Blessed Virgin Mary		409 Cathedral St, Baltimore	The first Catholic cathedral in the United States. Built 1806-1821
Grotto of Lourdes, National Shrine		Mount St. Mary's College & Seminary, Emmitsburg	
Shrine of the Little Flower		3500 Belair Rd, Baltimore	Founded in 1926, church dedicated in 1951. Now merged with St. Francis of Assisi Parish
National Shrine of St. Alphonsus Liguori		112-116, 125-127 W. Saratoga St, Baltimore	Established in 1845. Designated a shrine in 1995.
Shrine of St. Anthony		12290 Folly Quarter Rd, Ellicott City	Located within the St. Joseph Cupertino Friary
St. Jude Shrine		308 N. Paca St, Baltimore	Operated and staffed by the Pallottine Fathers and Brothers since 1917

== Former churches ==
Name	Image	Location	Description/sources
St. Peter's Pro-Cathedral		Charles St. at Saratoga St, Baltimore	Dedicated as parish church in 1770, became first pro-cathedral in United States in 1789. Closed in 1841 and demolished
St. Peter the Apostle		848 Hollins St, Baltimore	Founded in 1842 for Irish railroad workers, church dedicated in 1844. Closed in 2008
St. Stanislaus Kostka		700 S Ann St, Baltimore	Founded in 1879 for Polish immigrants, church dedicated in 1881. Closed in 2000
St. Francis of Assisi		Brunswick	
