= Jerome Aloysius Daugherty Sebastian =

American clergyman

His Excellency, The Most Reverend Jerome Aloysius Daugherty Sebastian
- Auxiliary Bishop of Baltimore
- Church: Roman Catholic
- Archdiocese: Roman Catholic Archdiocese of Baltimore

Orders
- Ordination: May 25, 1922 by Michael Joseph Curley
- Consecration: February 24, 1954 by Amleto Giovanni Cicognani

Personal details
- Born: November 22, 1895 Washington, D.C., US
- Died: October 11, 1960 (aged 64) Baltimore, Maryland, US
- Education: St. Charles College; St. Mary's Seminary
- Motto: Auspice regina cleri (Look at the queen of the clergy)

Jerome Aloysius Daugherty Sebastian (November 22, 1895 – October 11, 1960) was an American prelate of the Roman Catholic Church in the United States. He served as an auxiliary bishop of the Archdiocese of Baltimore in Maryland from 1954 until his death in 1960.

== Biography ==
=== Early life ===
Jerome Sebastian was born on November 22, 1895, in Washington, D.C., to William Henry and Kathryn (née Lyons) Sebastian. He was named after Reverend Jerome Daugherty. Jerome received his early education at St. Patrick's Academy in Washington and then attended St. Charles College in Catonsville, Maryland. He then studied theology at St. Mary's Seminary in Baltimore, Maryland.

=== Priesthood ===
On May 25, 1922, Sebastian was ordained to the priesthood in Baltimore by Archbishop Michael Curley for the Archdiocese of Baltimore. After his ordination, the archdiocese assigned Sebastian as a curate at St. Elizabeth Parish in Baltimore. He was later appointed as its pastor He also served as director of the Sodality Union of Baltimore, director of the Women's Retreat League of Baltimore, director of the Junior Newman Centres, chaplain of the Carroll Club of Johns Hopkins University in Baltimore, a prosynodal judge of the archdiocesan tribunal, and as director of vocations.

=== Auxiliary Bishop of Baltimore ===
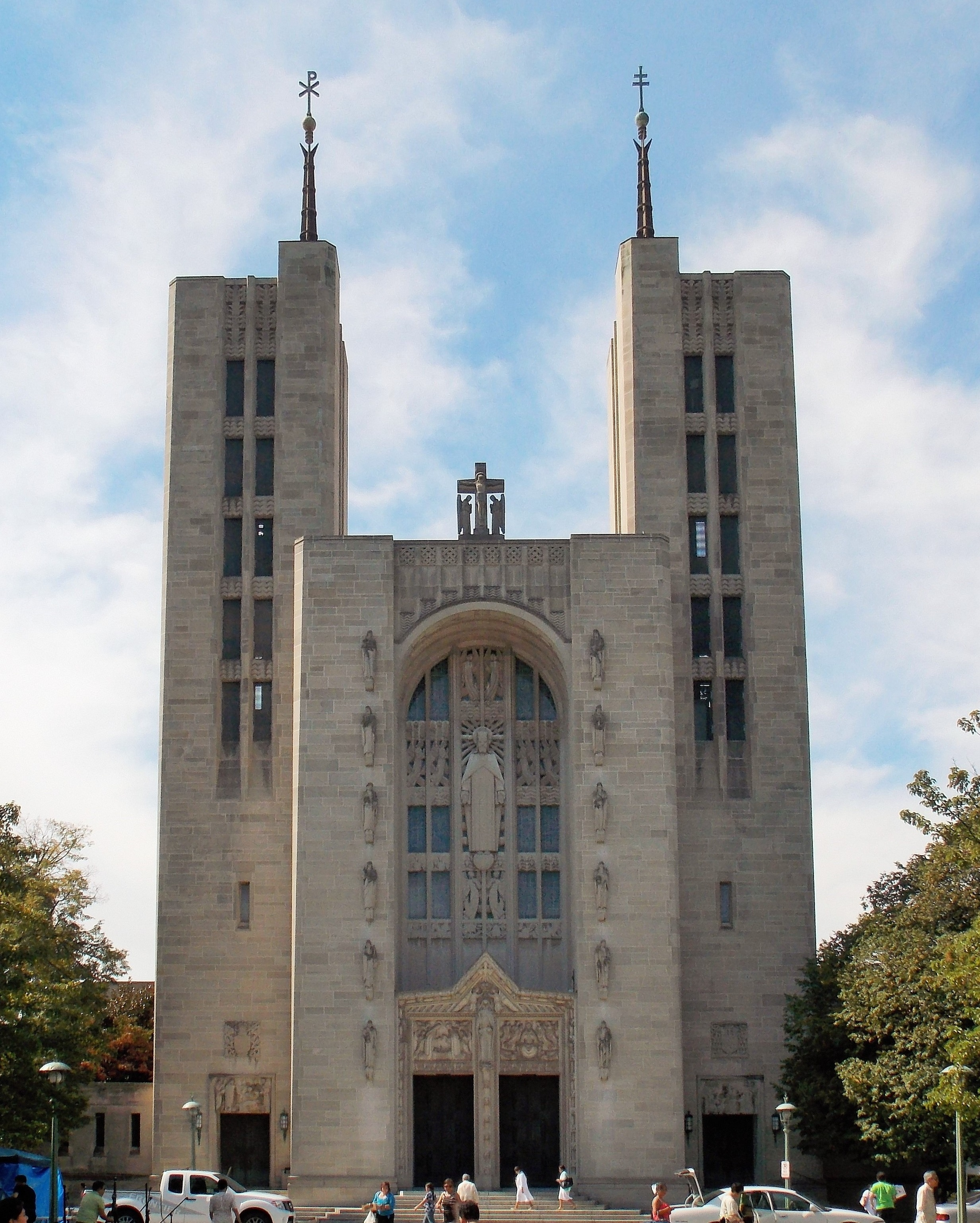
Cathedral of Mary Our Queen, Baltimore, Maryland (2015)

On December 22, 1953, Sebastian was appointed as an auxiliary bishop of Baltimore and titular bishop of Baris in Hellesponto by Pope Pius XII. He received his episcopal consecration on February 24, 1954, from Archbishop Amleto Giovanni Cicognani, with Bishops John Joyce Russell and Lawrence Shehan serving as co-consecrators, at the Basilica of the Assumption of the Blessed Virgin Mary in Baltimore He also served as vicar general of the archdiocese. He consecrated the Cathedral of Mary Our Queen on October 13, 1959.

=== Death ===
Sebastian died in Baltimore on October 11, 1960, at age 64. He was the first person to be interred in the crypt at the Cathedral of Mary Our Queen.

== See also ==
- Historical list of the Catholic bishops of the United States

Catholic Church titles
| Preceded by – | Auxiliary Archbishop of Baltimore; 1954 – 1960 | Succeeded by – |
