= MedStar Good Samaritan Hospital =

- MedStar Health
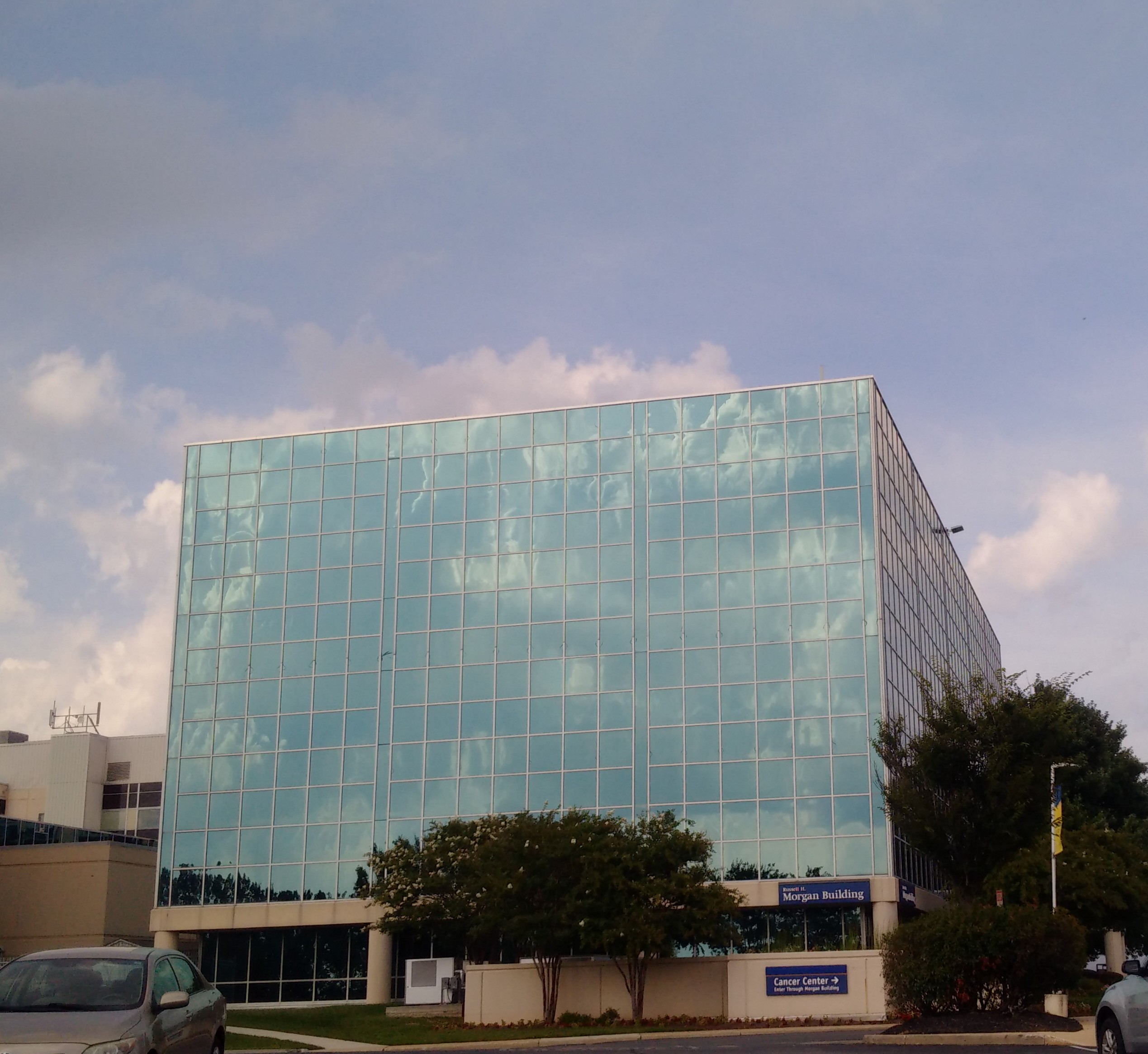
- Morgan Building, Good Samaritan Hospital

Geography
- Location: 5601 Loch Raven Boulevard, Baltimore, Maryland, United States
- Coordinates: 39.35945°N 76.58741°W

Organization
- Care system: Private
- Type: Teaching

Services
- Emergency department: Yes
- Beds: 137

History
- Founded: 1968

Links
- Website: http://MedStarGoodSam.org/
- Lists: Hospitals in Maryland

MedStar Good Samaritan Hospital is a hospital in Baltimore. It is located at the corner of Loch Raven Boulevard and East Belvedere Avenue.

U.S. News & World Report has named the hospital in its Top 50 for orthopedics, diabetes care and geriatrics.

MedStar Good Samaritan Hospital is a member of MedStar Health, a not-for-profit community-based network of nine hospitals and other providers serving Maryland and the Washington, D.C. region.

== History ==
MedStar Good Samaritan Hospital, a not-for-profit hospital, was founded as a Catholic hospital in 1968 through a gift from local merchant and philanthropist Thomas J. O'Neill, a Catholic businessman.

As the healthcare needs of the community changed, so has MedStar Good Samaritan. While active in the fields of rehabilitation, orthopaedics, renal dialysis and rheumatology, the hospital has expanded its range of health services.

Within the past 15 years, MedStar Good Samaritan has added two professional buildings to house office space for more than 200 physicians. The hospital also has established full-service inpatient and outpatient physical and occupational therapy programs.

In the past decade, MedStar Good Samaritan added a cardiac cath lab, intensive and critical care units, and an emergency department.

In the past several years, the hospital has added a number of programs and services to care for entire families: pediatricians and gynecologists are now on campus, in addition to a growing roster of primary care doctors and specialists. The Emergency Building was renamed the O′Neill Building, in honor of the founder, and an orthopedic, medical/surgical unit was added. Joint replacement patients now participate in a patient care program called JointExperience in a therapeutic setting on O'Neill 3. The hospital also features a geriatric medicine program, as well as three facilities for seniors: Belvedere Green and Woodbourne Woods, independent living facilities, and the Good Samaritan Nursing Center.

The hospital was at one time attached to the Women's Medical College of Baltimore.

In 1994, the hospital joined the Helix Health Network.

In 1999, Good Samaritan Hospital joined MedStar Health after being affiliated with Helix Health Network. It is the only Catholic hospital in the MedStar network.

In January 2010, Good Samaritan named Jeffrey A. Matton its new president, replacing Larry Beck, who retired.

In July 2023, MedStar Health named Thomas J. Senker the president of MedStar Good Samaritan as well as MedStar Union Memorial Hospital.
