= Blob's Park =

Former German-style beer hall in Maryland

- Location within Maryland

General information
- Location: 8024 Max Blobs Park Rd., Jessup, Maryland, USA
- Coordinates: 39°07′54″N 76°45′18″W

Blob's Park was a German-style beer hall that opened in 1933 in Jessup, Maryland. It was the "Home of America's First Oktoberfest". MD 917, one of the shortest numbered Maryland state routes at less than a mile long, runs from MD 175 to Blobs Park.

== Founder ==
In 1893, at age 10, Max Blob passed through Ellis Island, NYC, from Vogenberg, Germany. He was the oldest of three sons of Katherine and Phillip Blob. Accompanying were his two brothers, John and Henry. They settled on 150 acres outside of Jessup, Maryland.

The name "park" was not unique to Blobs. There was a tradition in the Baltimore area of private for-pay parks that had beer halls, shooting gallerias, dancing halls, etc. The largest and best known, Schuetzen Park, had two locations in Baltimore and one in Washington, D.C. They operated from 1866 to 1895, providing a community nexus for ethnic Germans to celebrate festivals like May Day, places to picnic, drink beer, and so on. They were called "parks" because they were often used by the lower and middle classes as a sort of private club safe place to picnic.

== 1933–2007 ==
With the end of Prohibition, in 1933, Max opened up Blob's Park for business. Blob's Park Bavarian Beer Garden was the home of America's first Oktoberfest back in 1947. While the original building interior was destroyed by fire in 1956, repairs got the beer hall back up in six weeks. After Max's death in February, 1969, his extended family kept the hall open. A new hall was built in 1976. The old hall was burned to clear the area for an outdoor pavilion in 1980. The new Blob's Park stayed up in operations until New Year's Eve, 2007 when owner John Eggerl retired and the land was earmarked for development.

== 2009–present ==
Planned development of the site was delayed because of the economic slowdown. Max Blob's grand-nephew Max Eggerl restored and renovated the place inside and out. He re-opened Blob's Park in 2009. Blob's Park was voted as the "Best Place To Polka" in Maryland by Baltimore Magazine and was nationally televised on CNN News and Good Morning America and was featured in many articles in the Baltimore and Washington newspapers. Blob's featured a 2,500 square foot wooden dance floor with seating capacity for nearly 1,000 people, an outside Pavilion, a lighted parking lot, as well as German/American food with full bar and restaurant facilities.

The facility was closed on March 31, 2014.

Eggerl opened a new restaurant, The Bavarian Brauhaus, in Hanover, Maryland at the site of the former Gunning's Seafood restaurant. The new Bavarian Brauhaus has a small stage for occasional live entertainment, but, unlike Blob's Park, does not host polka dancing.

Today, the St. Lawrence Martyr Church sits on the site of the former Blob's Park.
