= Cathedral of Mary Our Queen, Baltimore =

Catholic cathedral in Maryland, US

Cathedral of Mary Our Queen
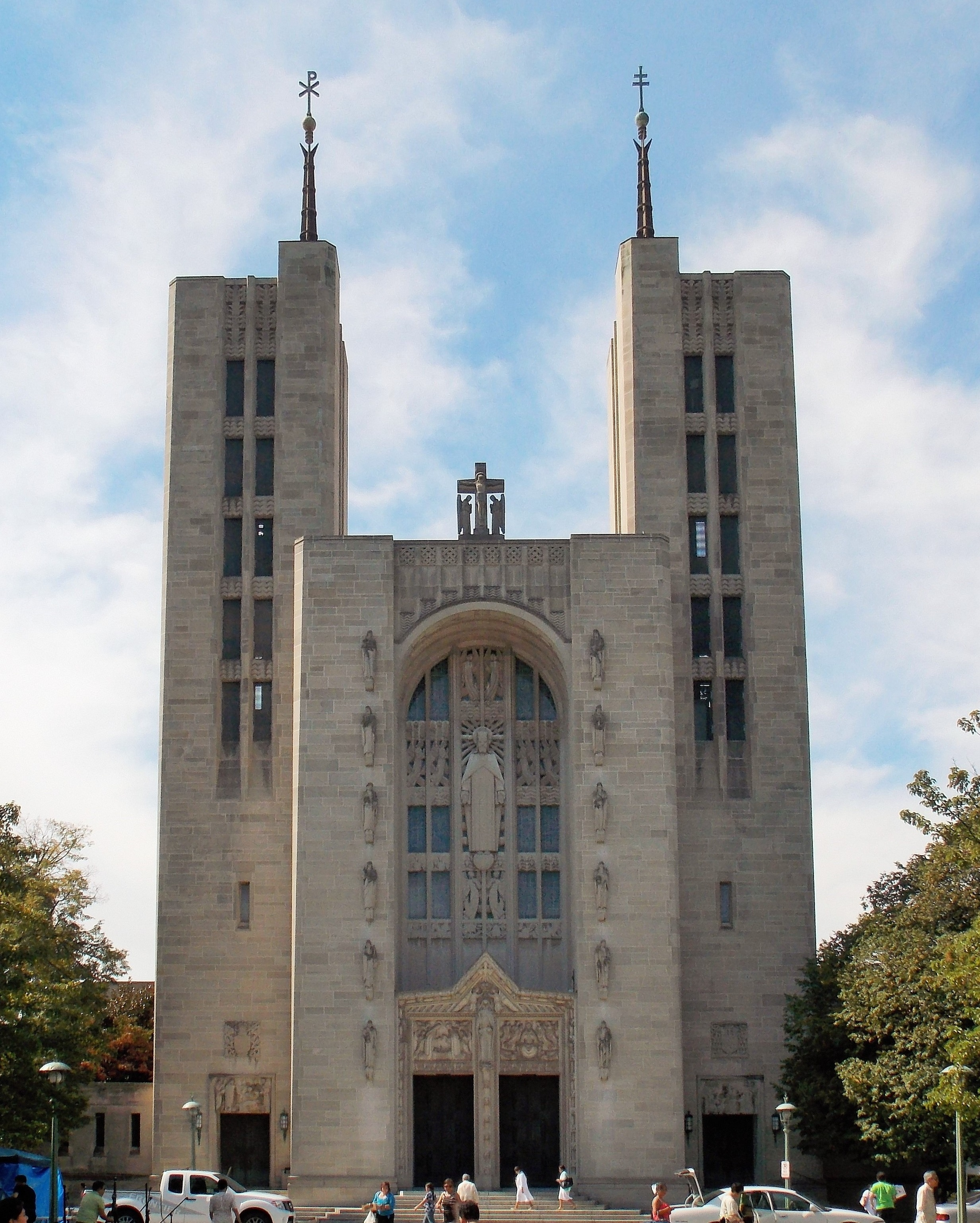
- Front view, Cathedral of Mary Our Queen
- Cathedral of Mary Our Queen
- 39°21′31″N 76°37′34″W
- Location: 5200 North Charles Street; Baltimore, Maryland
- Country: United States
- Denomination: Catholic Church
- Sui iuris church: Latin Church
- Website: www.cathedralofmary.org

History
- Status: Cathedral
- Dedication: Blessed Virgin Mary
- Consecrated: October 13, 1959

Architecture
- Functional status: Active
- Architectural type: Cathedral
- Style: English Gothic/Neo-Gothic Art Deco
- Groundbreaking: October 1954
- Completed: 1959

Specifications
- Capacity: 2,000 sitting
- Length: 373 feet (114 m)
- Width: 132 feet (40 m)
- Materials: brick, limestone

Administration
- Archdiocese: Baltimore

Clergy
- Archbishop: The Most Reverend William E. Lori
- Bishop(s): The Most Reverend Adam J. Parker, and The Most Reverend Denis J. Madden
- Rector: Reverend Father Louis A. Bianco

The Cathedral of Mary Our Queen is a Catholic cathedral in Baltimore, Maryland in the United States. Dedicated in 1959, the cathedral is the seat of the Archbishop of Baltimore. It replaced the Basilica of the National Shrine of the Assumption of the Blessed Virgin Mary, which now serves as co-cathedral for the archdiocese.

Mary Our Queen is located in the Homeland area of northern Baltimore, near Loyola University Maryland and St. Mary's Seminary and University. It is designed to seat 1,900 people.

== History ==
During the 1950s, the Basilica Cathedral of the Assumption, opened in 1821, was the cathedral for the Archdiocese of Baltimore. However, the archdiocese had grown tremendous over the decades and the Cathedral of the Assumption was now too small for the archdiocese's needs. Planning started to replace it soon after beginning of the 20th century.

The archdiocese in 1918 had received a $5 million bequest from Thomas J. O'Neill, an Irish American dry goods merchant. He believed that divine intervention had saved his department store from a massive fire in Baltimore in 1904. His will stated that part of the money should be used for a new cathedral. However, the money could not be used until the death of wife, which happened in 1936. The Great Depression and World War II further delayed the cathedral project. By the 1950's, this sum had grown to $14 million. The archdiocese was finally able to use it.

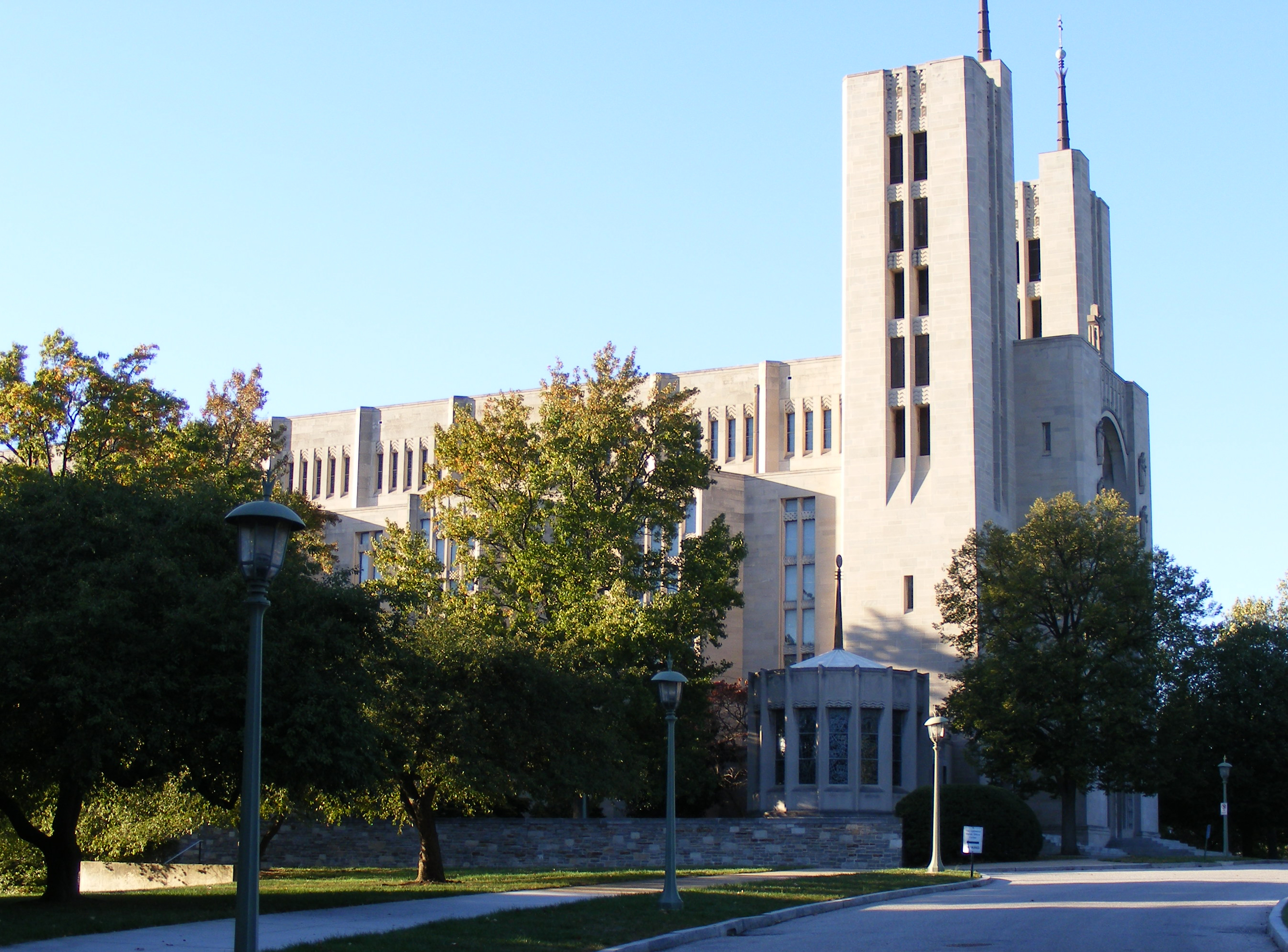
South view, Cathedral of Mary Our Queen (2008)

In October 1954, Archbishop Francis Patrick Keough broke ground for the new cathedral, as yet unnamed. Five years later, in October 1959, Auxiliary Bishop Jerome Sebastian of Baltimore consecrated Mary Our Queen. The archdiocese in 1960 moved the Saint Joseph’s Metropolitan School from its location in Baltimore to the grounds of the cathedral. It was renamed the Cathedral School of Mary Our Queen. Archbishop Karol Józef Wojtyła of the Archdiocese of Krakow in Poland visited Mary Our Queen in 1976. He would return as Pope John Paul II in 1995.

The archdiocese in September 2024, as part of its consolidation of parishes in Baltimore, announced the merging of St. Mary of Assumption Parish in the Govans district of Baltimore with the cathedral parish.In October 2024, the diocese completed a $2.75 million project to replace all the incandescent lighting inside the cathedral with LED lights and to upgrade the electrical circuits. The upgrades provided significant improvements in the illumination of the cathedral. They archdiocese also installed new glass doors at the cathedral's main entrance.

The archdiocese in November 2024 finished alterations to the high altar in the cathedral, allowing it to be used for masses again. After the Second Vatican Council in the early 1960s the normal practice became that priests should face the people during mass, which was not feasible with the layout of the high altar. The alterations installed a platform behind the altar that the priest could now face the congregation.

In April 2025, hundreds of mourners gathered outside the cathedral for a Mass of Remembrance for Pope Francis.

== Architecture ==
The archdiocese chose Maginnis, Walsh, and Kennedy, an architectural firm in Boston, Massachusetts, to design the new cathedral. Since 1905, the firm had designed dozens of Catholic churches, schools and cathedrals across the United States. They provide the archdiocese with three design themes to choose from: traditional, modified and modern.The archdiocese chose the modified design, which combined a Gothic Revival structure with Art Deco accents.

== Description ==
The cathedral was constructed of brick-faced limestone, using over three million bricks and 70,000 pieces of Indiana limestone. No structural steel was used in its construction. It has a classical east-facing cruciform floor plan. The cathedral measures 373 feet (114 m) long, 132 feet (40 m) wide and 163 feet (50 m) to the top of the two spires. It can accommodate 1,900 people. The cathedral contains four side chapels:

- Blessed Sacrament
- St. Joseph
- Our Lady
- St. Thomas More. More was the patron saint of the original benefactor of the cathedral, Thomas O’Neill.

Mary Our Queen features an extensive sculptural program executed by Joseph Coletti.

=== Towers ===
The cathedral has two towers. One of the tower is topped by the Chi-Rho symbol. It has four bells that ring three times per day. The other tower is topped by the metropolitan cross.

=== Crypt ===
The crypt below the main floor of Mary Our Queen serves as a burial place for the archbishops and auxiliary bishops of Baltimore.

- Auxiliary Bishop Jerome Sebastian, d. 1960
- Archbishop Francis Keough, d. 1961
- Cardinal Lawrence Shehan, d. 1984
- Auxiliary Bishop Thomas Murphy, d. 1991
- Auxiliary Bishop Philip Murphy, d. 1999
- Archbishop William Borders, d. 2010
- Auxiliary Bishop William Newman, d. 2017

== Organs ==
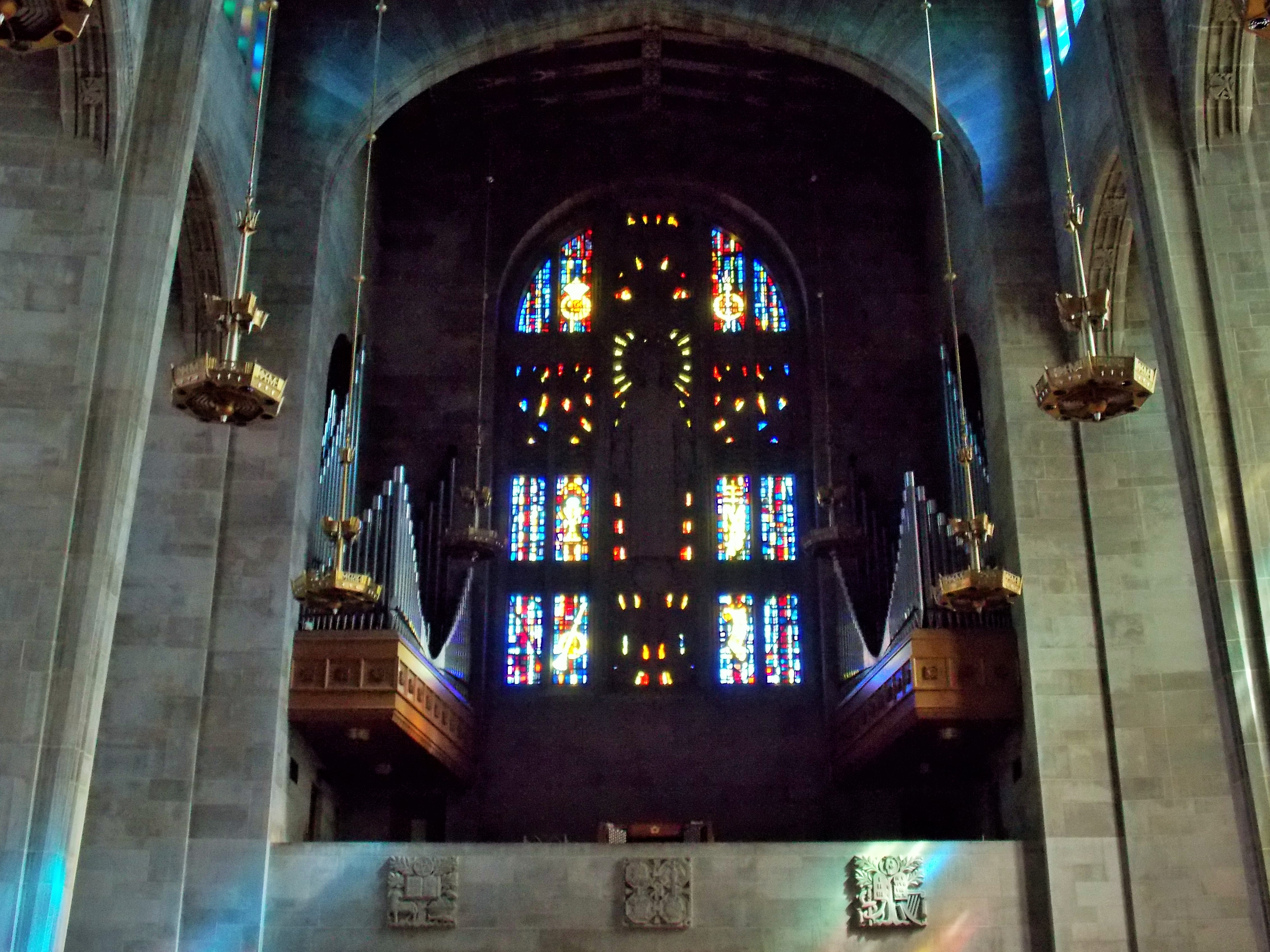
The rear gallery and organ pipes (2014)

Mary Our Queen has two organs: the Great Gallery organ and the chancel organ.. The original organs were Opus 9200 of the M. P. Moller Company of Hagerstown, Maryland. After 46 years of use and some considerable damage due to water and smoke, the archdiocese in 2005 decided to restore both organs. It chose Schantz Organ Co. of Ohio to restore and replace many parts of the original instruments. The restoration began with the Great Gallery organ, then continued with the chancel organ.

In addition to new pipe work, voice work, and new wind chests, Schantz built two new identical four-manual consoles—one for the gallery and one for the chancel—allowing the organist to control both organs from either location. The chancel console can be moved around the sanctuary to suit various needs. In the original Moller installation, the Great Gallery organ console had four-manuals and could control over both the gallery and sanctuary organs. The sanctuary organ console was two manuals, had complete control over the sanctuary organ and the gallery organ through "blind" controls. The sanctuary console was replaced in 1974 due to a fire in the console which caused smoke damage to both organs' pipework. After the renovations, the Great Gallery organ holds 100 ranks, and the sanctuary organ holds 27.

The first solo concert performance on the restored organ occurred in July 2007, by Cherry Rhodes during the closing ceremonies of the American Guild of Organists regional convention. The organ was played in recital during the Organ Historical Society Convention in July 2024.

== See also ==
- List of churches in the Archdiocese of Baltimore
- List of Catholic cathedrals in the United States
- List of cathedrals in the United States
