= MedStar Health =

American not-for-profit healthcare organization

- Type: Private, not-for-profit
- Industry: Health Care
- Founded: February 4, 1998; 28 years ago
- Headquarters: Columbia, Maryland, United States
- Number of locations: 10 hospitals and more than 500 care sites
- Area served: Baltimore–Washington metropolitan area
- Key people: Kenneth A. Samet, FACHE, President & CEO
- Revenue: ▲US$8.3 billion (2024)
- Net income: US$69.9 million (2012)
- Total assets: US$853.5 million (2012)
- Number of employees: 35,000
- Website: Homepage

MedStar Health is a not-for-profit healthcare organization. It operates more than 120 entities, including ten hospitals in the Baltimore–Washington metropolitan area of the United States. In 2011 it was ranked as the private sector employer with the largest number of local employees in the region.

MedStar Health pays approximately $111 million in payroll tax to the District of Columbia, Maryland and Virginia each year. Additionally, as of 2012, MedStar Health provided almost $312 million in charity care and community benefit on an annual basis.

== History ==
In 1998, Medlantic Healthcare Group merged with Helix Health, a group of four Baltimore, Maryland, hospitals. Helix/Medlantic was then renamed to MedStar Health on February 1, 1999.

On July 1, 2000, Georgetown University Hospital became part of MedStar Health.

On February 1, 2008, MedStar Health merged with Montgomery General Hospital, Montgomery County's oldest acute care hospital. Montgomery General was the eighth hospital in MedStar Health's network and the first hospital in Montgomery County to join the healthcare system.

In September, 2009, St. Mary's Hospital in Leonardtown, Maryland, merged with MedStar Health, becoming the ninth hospital in the system, and the first in Southern Maryland.

In December, 2012, MedStar Southern Maryland Hospital Center, located in Clinton, Maryland, merged with MedStar Health, becoming the tenth hospital in the system.

== General ==
MedStar Health's areas of clinical activity include cardiology, cardiac surgery, oncology services, rehabilitation, neurosciences, orthopedic surgery, women's services, and emergency and trauma services. MedStar has comprehensive services including primary, urgent and subacute care, medical education and research. Other health-related services include assisted living, home health and long-term care. MedStar also operate nursing homes, senior housing, adult day care, rehabilitation and ambulatory centers, as well as maintain MedStar Physician Partners, a comprehensive physician network in Maryland and the Washington, D.C., region. (MedStar does not have any hospitals or institutions in Virginia, but MedStar Visiting Nurses Association does serve some counties there.) MedStar Health is the official medical team of the Baltimore Ravens, the Washington Capitals, the Washington Wizards as well as other professional, college and recreational teams in the area.

Kenneth A. Samet is MedStar Health's president and chief executive officer.

== Facilities ==
=== MedStar Franklin Square Medical Center ===
MedStar Franklin Square Medical Center is an acute-care teaching hospital, located in the Rosedale area of Northeastern Baltimore County, offering a full range of services for children and adults. Founded in 1898, MedStar Franklin Square's primary service lines include medicine, oncology, surgical services, women and children's care, behavioral health, and community-based medicine. MedStar Franklin Square has been awarded the high-level designation of a Teaching Hospital Cancer Center by the American College of Surgeons, and was accredited as a Magnet hospital for nursing in 2008, with reaccreditation in 2013. It has been the recipient of the Delmarva Foundation's highest honor, the Excellence Award for Quality for Hospitals, in 2009, 2011 and 2012. U.S. News & World Report ranked the hospital as third best in Maryland and the Baltimore metropolitan area; it was also ranked among the nation's top 50 "Best Hospitals" in Gastroenterology and Digestive system (GI) surgery. This is the fourth consecutive year the hospital has been included in this ranking.

It is the third largest hospital in Baltimore, and its emergency department is the busiest in the state with almost 110,000 visits annually. In the fall of 2010, the hospital completed a major expansion project that includes a new seven-story Patient Care Tower, an expanded emergency department, and additional parking facilities.

=== MedStar Georgetown University Hospital ===
MedStar Georgetown University Hospital is a not-for-profit, acute care teaching and research hospital with 609 beds located in Northwest Washington, D.C. Founded in the Jesuit principle of cura personalis – caring for the whole person – MedStar Georgetown offers a variety of diagnostic and treatment options. MedStar Georgetown's "centers of excellence" include cancer, neurosciences, gastroenterology, transplant and vascular diseases.

=== MedStar Good Samaritan Hospital ===
MedStar Good Samaritan Hospital is a 303-bed community teaching facility located at the corner of Loch Raven Boulevard and Belvedere Avenue in northeast Baltimore. The original funds for the creation of Good Samaritan Hospital were donated by Baltimore Merchant, Thomas J. O'Neill Both a specialty facility and comprehensive community hospital, MedStar Good Samaritan has Centers for Excellence in Arthritis, Joint Replacement, Rehabilitation, Good Health Center, Spine Health, and Surgical Services.

For more than 30 years, the hospital has been affiliated with the Johns Hopkins School of Medicine, with special programs in physical and rehabilitation medicine, orthopedics, and rheumatology. MedStar Good Samaritan opened a full-service emergency department in 1990. Since then, it consistently has been one of the fastest-growing hospitals in Maryland.

In 2003, a new emergency department opened and fueled the ever-growing demand for the expert care provided by more than 2,000 associates. The emergency department is accredited as a primary stroke center.

In 2005, the hospital opened nine new operating rooms that are specially designed to enhance experiences for patients, surgeons and staff.

In 2006, a new 32-bed inpatient unit opened, one that is dedicated to orthopedic and surgical patients. This unit features mostly private rooms, decentralized nursing stations to keep caregivers closer to the patients and a large area for group physical therapy. All other hospital patient care units were recently renovated.

=== MedStar Harbor Hospital ===
MedStar Harbor Hospital was first established in 1903 as a small community clinic servicing the waterfront community in Baltimore. It has been the recipient of the Delmarva Foundation's highest honor, the Excellence Award for Quality for Hospitals, in 2001, 2006, 2007, 2008, 2010, 2011 & 2012.

=== MedStar Montgomery Medical Center ===
As Montgomery County's first acute-care hospital, MedStar Montgomery Medical Center is a community-based, 149-bed facility founded by Dr. Jacob Wheeler Bird. After 90 years, the hospital offers a range of wellness programs and outpatient services in addition to inpatient treatment.

=== MedStar National Rehabilitation Hospital ===
The MedStar National Rehabilitation Hospital (NRH) is a private facility located in Washington, D.C. offering inpatient, day treatment and outpatient programs specifically designed for the rehabilitation of people with disabling injuries and illnesses. For the 19th year, U.S. News & World Report ranked it one of the top rehabilitation hospitals in the country, being listed in 2013 at number 11 overall. It is ranked as the 3rd best hospital overall in the Washington, D.C. metropolitan area.

MedStar NRH is fully accredited by Commission on Accreditation of Rehabilitation Facilities, the only such specialty program for spinal cord injury and stroke in the region. Its spinal cord injury program has been designated one of fourteen Model SCI Systems of care in the US by the National Institute on Disability and Rehabilitation Research, a part of the United States Department of Education.

=== MedStar St. Mary's Hospital ===
MedStar St. Mary's Hospital is a not-for-profit, 103-bed full service hospital located in Leonardtown, St. Mary's County, Maryland. Serving the community since 1912, MedStar St. Mary's treats more than 104,000 patients each year and has been recognized for excellence in quality improvement by the Delmarva Foundation in 2012, 2011, 2010, 2009, 2008 and 2004. MedStar St. Mary's delivers emergency, acute inpatient, and outpatient care.

=== MedStar Southern Maryland Hospital Center ===
Founded in 1977, MedStar Southern Maryland Hospital Center is a 262-bed full service hospital in Clinton, Maryland serving the Washington, D.C., and Southern Maryland areas. Additionally, the hospital operates a 24-bed sub-acute unit.

=== MedStar Union Memorial Hospital ===
Located in the Central section of Baltimore, MedStar Union Memorial Hospital is a regional specialty and teaching hospital that has been caring for members of the community for more than 150 years. MedStar Union Memorial has been named one of the nation's top 100 hospitals for cardiovascular care by Thomson. The hospital was also named in U.S. News & World Report's annual list of top hospitals by ranking in cardiology and heart surgery, and orthopedics. MedStar Union Memorial also received high-performing scores in eight specialty areas: Diabetes and Endocrinology, Ear Nose and Throat, Gastroenterology, Geriatrics, Nephrology, Neurology & Neurosurgery, Pulmonology and Urology. MedStar Union Memorial is known nationally for the Curtis National Hand Center and for developing Maryland's leading hospital-based sports medicine program. The 283-bed hospital supports residency and fellowship training programs in orthopedics, general surgery, and internal medicine, and received the prestigious Excellence Awards for Quality Improvement for Hospitals from the Delmarva Foundation in 2008, 2009, 2010, 2011, and 2012.

=== MedStar Washington Hospital Center ===
MedStar Washington Hospital Center is a not-for-profit, 926-bed acute care teaching and research hospital based in Northwest Washington, D.C. It is the largest private hospital in Washington, D.C.and among the 25 largest hospitals in the mid-Atlantic region. It consistently ranks among the nation's top hospitals as measured by entities such as U.S. News & World Report, AARP and Consumer's Checkbook.

The hospital also operates the area's only adult burn center, its premier trauma center and surgical critical care center, providing major trauma resuscitation, surgery and care of critically ill or injured patients. It is a national leader in the research, diagnosis and treatment of cardiovascular disease.

== Other entities ==
MedStar Ambulatory Services provides outpatient services, including primary care practices.

MedStar Family Choice is a managed care organization serving the District of Columbia and Maryland. Coverage is provided for participants in DC, and Maryland.

- Maryland Children's Health Program

MedStar Health Research Institute (MHRI) offers research support for MedStar's medical and instructional services.

MedStar offers outpatient pharmacies in hospitals including Leisure World in Silver Spring, Maryland.

MedStar Physician Partners is a group of more 100 primary care physicians. It is part of the MedStar Medical Group that has over 5,600 affiliated physicians and 1,560 employed physicians across Maryland and the Washington, D.C., region.

MedStar Surgery Center is a stand-alone multi-specialty surgery center in Downtown Washington, D.C.

MedStar Visiting Nurse Association is the largest home healthcare provider in the Maryland, District of Columbia and Northern Virginia region. It provides in-home healthcare services for homebound patients who were recently discharged from the hospital. It also cares for those who are disabled or living with a chronic condition. According to the Centers for Medicare and Medicaid Services' Home Healthcare Compare website,
