= Henchir-Mâtria =

Archaeological and prehistoric site in Tunisia

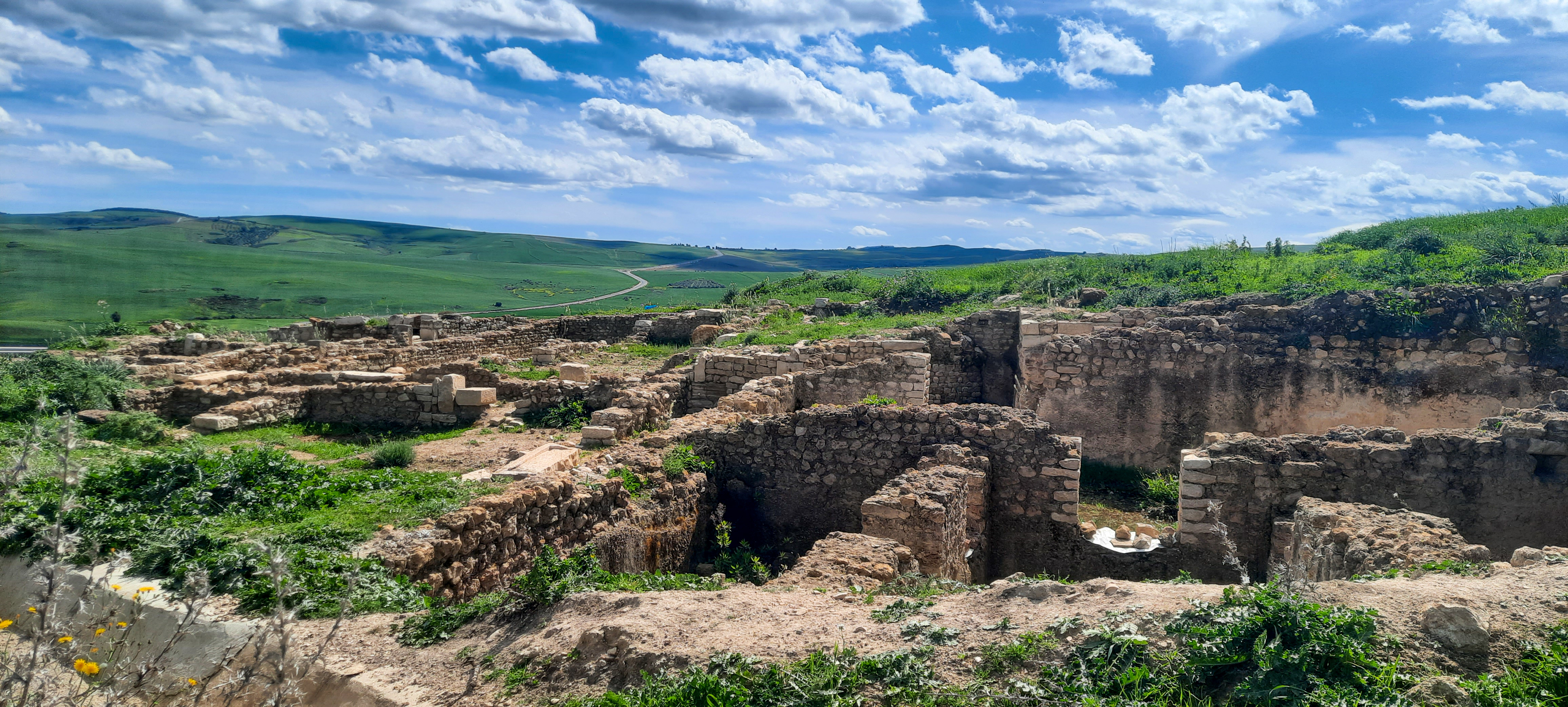
Numluli

Henchir-Mâtria is an archaeological and prehistoric site in northern Tunisia. Henchir-Mâtria is at 36°31′23.4″N 9°13′11.1″E, between Béja and Dougga and elevation of 407 metres (1,335 feet). It is on the Oued el Beida River.

== History ==
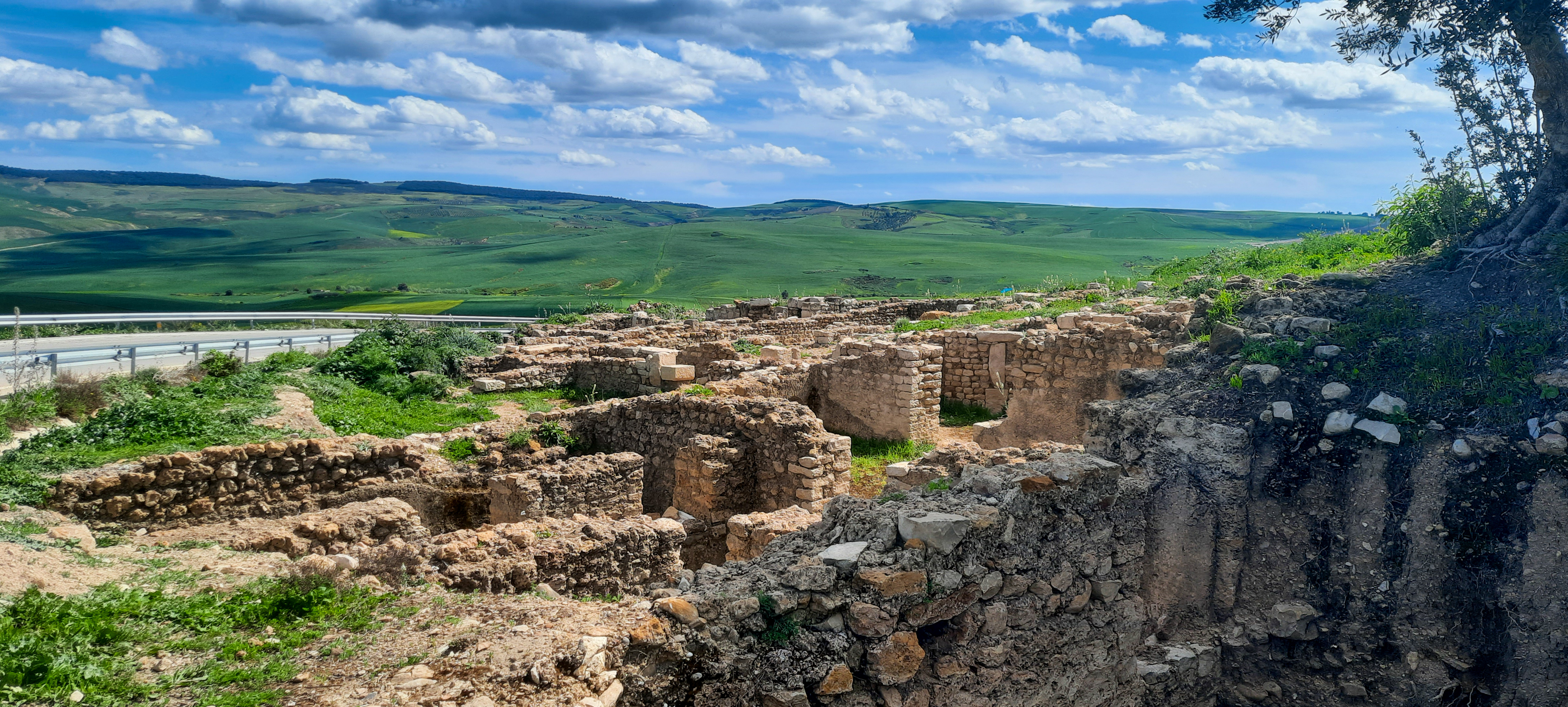

During the Roman Empire and late antiquity Henchir-Mâtria was a civitas in the Roman province of Africa Proconsolaris called Numluli.

Several structures have been uncovered there.

== Bishopric ==
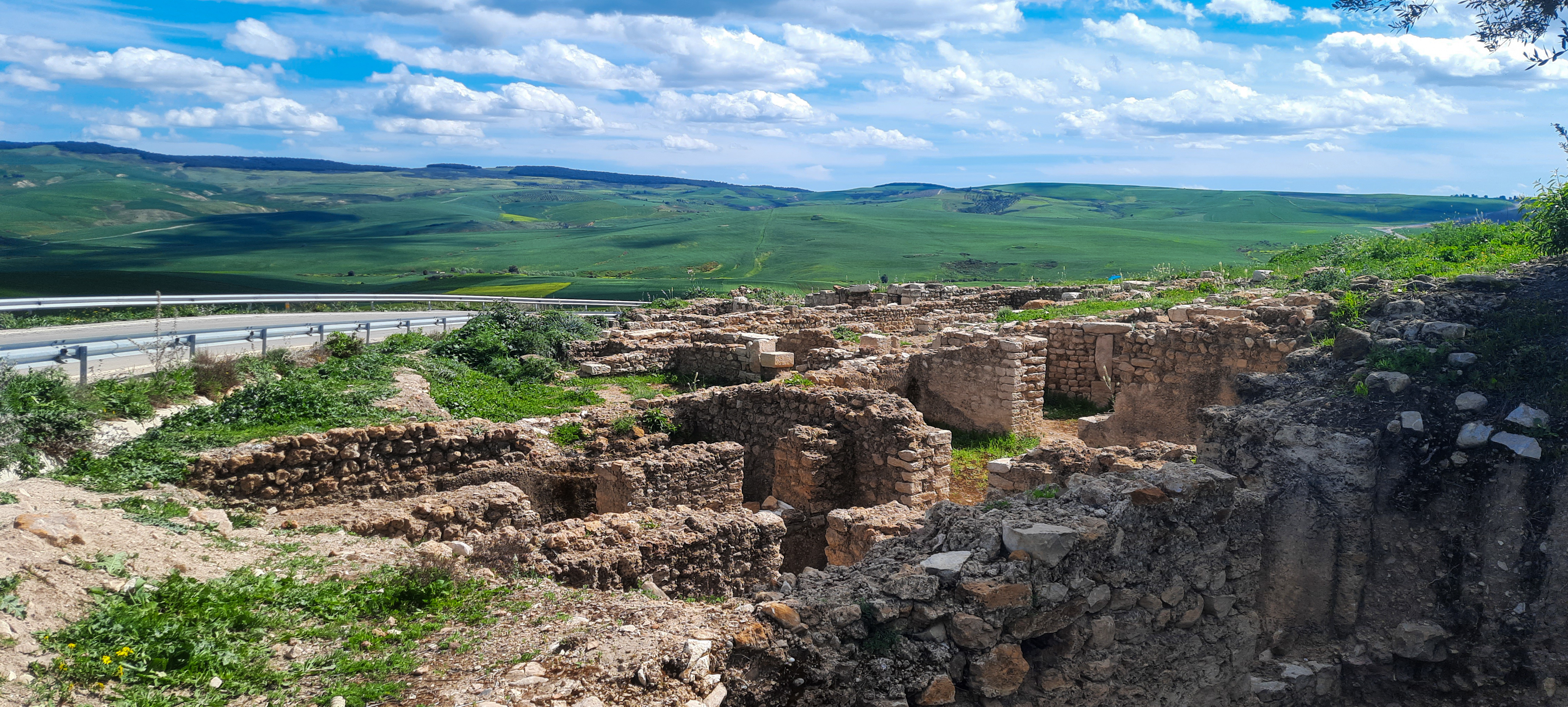

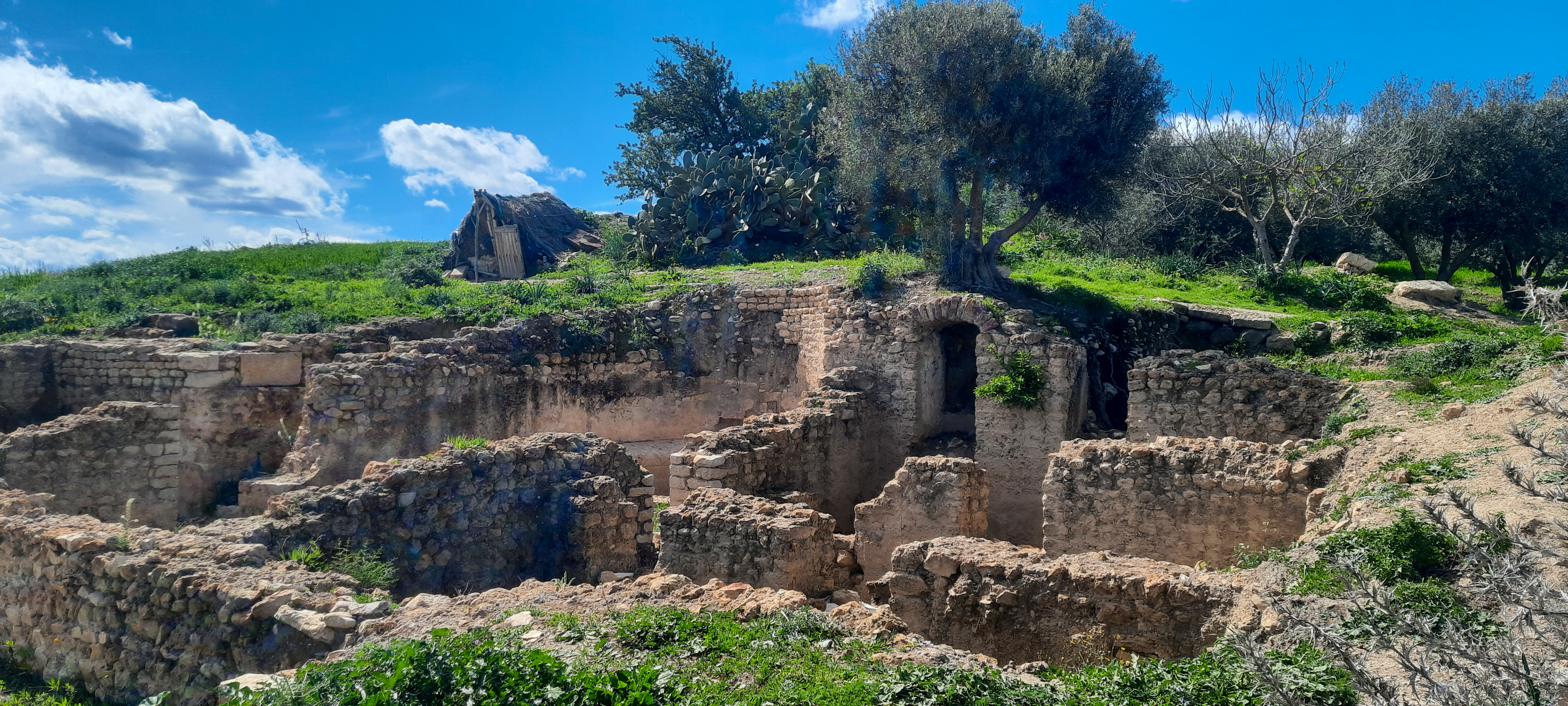

During antiquity Henchir-matria was also the seat of an ancient Christian Bishopric, suffragan to the Archdiocese of Carthage. History records two bishops of the town Aurelius a Catholic attendee at the Council of Carthage of 411, and the bishop Donatian who attended the anti monothetalism Council of 646. Today the diocese survives as titular see of the Roman Catholic Church. The Most recent Bishop was William Clifford Newman, of Baltimore, who died May 20th, 2017.
