= Our Lady of Sorrows Catholic Church, West River, Maryland =

Coordinates: 38°50′51″N 76°35′56″W

Our Lady of Sorrows
- Our Lady of Sorrows
- Location: West River, Maryland
- Country: United States
- Denomination: Roman Catholic
- Website: 22 July 2025

History
- Founded: 1866

Architecture
- Style: Colonial
- Years built: 1866
- Demolished: 1951, rebuilt

Our Lady of Sorrows is a historic Catholic Church located in West River, Maryland, United States.

== History ==
Our Lady of Sorrows was originally a country mission church, dedicated as Our Lady of Dolors, but was later anglicized as Our Lady of Sorrows. The original church was founded in 1866 and was built of wood-frame construction. It was staffed by Redemptorist priests until 1890 when the Marist Fathers took over. The church underwent a number of restorations and enlargements over the years but was eventually demolished in 1951 to make way for a new church, built of brick in the Georgian style.
