= Thomas Austin Murphy =

American bishop

His Excellency, The Most Reverend Thomas Austin Murphy
- Auxiliary Bishop of Baltimore
- Church: Roman Catholic
- Archdiocese: Roman Catholic Archdiocese of Baltimore

Orders
- Ordination: June 10, 1937 by Michael Joseph Curley
- Consecration: July 3, 1962 by Egidio Vagnozzi

Personal details
- Born: May 11, 1911 Baltimore, Maryland, US
- Died: November 17, 1991 (aged 80) Baltimore
- Education: St. Charles College; St. Mary's Seminary

Thomas Austin Murphy (May 11, 1911—November 17, 1991) was an American prelate of the Roman Catholic Church in the United States He served as an auxiliary bishop of the Archdiocese of Baltimore in Maryland from 1962 to 1984.

== Biography ==
=== Early life ===
Thomas Murphy was born on May 11, 1911, in Baltimore, Maryland, the second of five children of Thomas Andrew and Ella Cecilia (née Brady) Murphy. He received his early education at St. Martin parochial school, and graduated from high school in 1925. He attended St. Charles College in Catonsville and St. Mary's Seminary in Baltimore.

=== Priesthood ===
On June 10, 1937, Murphy was ordained to the priesthood for the Archdiocese of Baltimore by Archbishop Michael Joseph Curley at the Basilica of the Assumption of the Blessed Virgin Mary in Baltimore. After his ordination, the archdiocese assigned Murphy at St. Dominic Parish in Baltimore, then transferred to St. Rose of Lima Parish in Baltimore. In 1951, Murphy was appointed pastor of St. Rose. During this period, Murphy also served as director of the Legion of Decency in the archdiocese, moderator of the Archdiocesan Veteran Mission Crusade, and a member of the Archdiocesan Tribunal, Clergymen's Interfaith Committee on Human Rights, and Social Action Committee.

=== Auxiliary Bishop of Baltimore ===
On May 23, 1962, Murphy was appointed as an auxiliary bishop of Baltimore and titular bishop of Appiaria by Pope John XXIII. He received his episcopal consecration on July 3, 1962, from Archbishop Egidio Vagnozzi, with Bishops John Joyce Russell and Michael William Hyle serving as co-consecrators, at the Cathedral of Mary Our Queen in Baltimore. He remained as pastor of St. Rose until 1972, but continued his residence there.

=== Retirement and death ===
He continued to serve as an auxiliary bishop until his retirement on May 29, 1984. Murphy died in Baltimore on November 17, 1991 at age 80, and was buried in the crypt at the Cathedral of Mary Our Queen in Baltimore.

== See also ==
Catholic Church titles
Preceded by –	Auxiliary Bishop of Baltimore; 1962–1984	Succeeded by –
