= Thomas J. O'Neill =

Thomas J. O'Neill (November 11, 1849 – April 6, 1919) was an Irish-born American merchant and philanthropist. He was one of eight children of John and Anne Lynch O'Neill of County Cavan in north central Ireland. He died on April 6, 1919, of a sudden heart ailment in Baltimore, Maryland, at age 69. O'Neill arrived in Baltimore from Ireland at age 16 in 1866 "with only pennies in his pocket." Immediately, he hired himself out as an apprentice in a downtown linen shop.

== Early Life ==
Thomas O'Neill was born on November 11, 1849, to John O’Neill and Annie Lynch O’Neill in the town of Killeshandra, Cavan. His father John was a merchant and ran a store established in the Drapery trade. Thomas was the eldest of eight siblings: Francis (born 1851), Ann (born 1852), Joseph (born 1855), Ellen (born 1858), John (born 1860), Elizabeth (born 1861) and Ed (born 1865). Following his brother Ed’s birth, the family emigrated in 1866 to Baltimore, Maryland.

== O'Neill & Co. department store ==
In 1882, when he was 33 years old, he went into a brief partnership to establish his own dry goods store. Its twenty-foot front was located at Charles and Lexington Streets. Buying out his partner, O'Neill was soon in full command of his promising enterprise. His fortunes grew as his store eventually absorbed three adjacent buildings and expanded to branches in Dublin, London, and Paris, providing a livelihood for more than 500 employees.

== Great Baltimore Fire ==
On Sunday morning, February 7, 1904, what later became known as the Great Baltimore Fire began in the dry goods firm of John E. Hurst & Co., located on the south side of German Street between Hopkins Place and Liberty Street at the current site of the Royal Farms Arena. The first alarm was turned in at 10:20 a.m. but the blaze was out of control within minutes, fanned by a wind that pushed the fire east by northeast in the direction of O'Neill & Co, which was about 400 yards away. By afternoon, most of the buildings south of the department store in the block bounded by Hopkins Place and Redwood, Fayette and Charles streets had been destroyed. Meeting in the offices of Mayor Robert McLane, city engineers recommended dynamiting buildings in the path of the blaze so there would be nothing left to burn—the demolished lots would create an artificial firebreak that would stop the conflagration in its tracks. By 5 p.m., blasting had begun, bringing down J. W. Putts department store on the southwest corner of Charles and Fayette streets. The next large building slated for demolition was on the northwest corner of Charles and Lexington—O'Neill's department store. When firefighters rushed into the store to plant their charges, O'Neill reportedly told them, "Gentlemen, you'll have to blow me up, too!"

A devout Catholic, O'Neill had just rushed back from the Carmelite Convent on Biddle Street in east Baltimore, where he had gone to beg the nuns—including his sister—to pray for the safety of his store. When the 1904 fire broke out, the blank wall of the southernmost addition, which had been recently completed, was the area most directly threatened by the flames. At the same time, his workers stopped up exterior downspouts and drains, then flooded the roof with water from the building's rooftop water tank. Despite these efforts, the flames reached the exterior walls of the department store's southernmost building, igniting a portion of the cornice and then part of the roof. "In the fire of 1904, of the stores on Charles Street, O'Neill's alone remained untouched." At its peak, the temperature of the fire was estimated at 2500 degrees; buildings new and old in its path succumbed quickly to the flames. By the time it was brought under control the following day (February 8), the fire had destroyed much of central Baltimore, including over 1,500 buildings covering an area of some 140 acres (57 ha).

On his return from the convent—and after the confrontation with the would-be dynamiters—the wind suddenly shifted. The fire turned south and east, and the store was saved. O'Neill believed that prayer saved his store when waves of flame threatened.

== Closing of O'Neill's ==
O'Neil's closed in 1954, in part because of the coming of the new Charles Center redevelopment and partly because the company could not renegotiate the leases on the four properties it occupied. "When O'Neill died in 1918, his will included a $5 million bequest to build a new cathedral to replace Benjamin Latrobe's Basilica of the Assumption, along with funds to Loyola University Maryland to build a church (St. Ignatius) and monies to construct a hospital (MedStar Good Samaritan Hospital).

O'Neill's legacy: A new cathedral and a hospital After his death in 1919, O'Neill bequeathed $5 million to Cardinal James Gibbons and his successors to be used “as a nucleus for, and for the erecting of, a Catholic Church in the City of Baltimore.” The merchant had stipulated that the money was not to be used until after the death of his wife, Roberta. Although she died in 1936, the Great Depression and World War II delayed progress on the building and over time the original bequest to the cardinal had grown to $14 million. The sum was divided into $9 million for the new cathedral and adjacent buildings, and $5 million for a postgraduate hospital. Ultimately, the construction of the Cathedral of Mary our Queen, completed in 1959, used $8.5 million of that legacy.

== Will bequest ==
"... All the balance of my estate (including, after the death of my said sisters and brothers, the sum so as aforesaid put aside by my trustees to pay the annuities above mentioned) unto Most Reverend James Gibbons, Roman Catholic Archbishop of Baltimore for the time being, and his successors in the Archiepiscopal See of Baltimore, according to the discipline and government of the Roman Catholic Church, a Corporation Sole, as a nucleus for, and for the erecting of, a Cathedral Church in the City of Baltimore.... In testimony whereof I have hereunto set my hand and affixed my seal, and placing my signature on the margin of the four pages hereof this 10th day Of July A.D. 1912. His will provided an annual dividend pour his wife Roberta, his brother and four sisters (one of whom was a Sisters of Charity). It also offered his employees an opportunity to become shareholders and joint owners of his business. Every employee with at least two years of service received a bonus.

Normally, a church is not dedicated until it is paid for in full; because of O'Neill's bequest, the Cathedral of Mary Our Queen was the rare instance where the church was consecrated just before its formal opening. -THOMAS O'NEILL" (7) "It is the only cathedral in the 2,000 year history of the Church that was donated by a single individual". His bequest for a new Cathedral (some waggish Baltimoreans called it "O'Neill's Uptown" after it was built) completely paid for the building, but did not allocate a dollar for maintenance, and the will stated that the funds could be used only for the designated purpose of design and construction.

== Personal life ==
O'Neill married Roberta LeBrou, of a prominent Baltimore family, in 1890 at the Church of the Immaculate Conception in Baltimore (not to be confused with Immaculate Conception parish in Towson). The couple lived at 1731 Park Avenue, in Bolton Hill. They had no children, but Mr. O'Neill's sisters (and possibly one brother) shared the home. The house today has an historic plaque marking O'Neill's occupancy.

The O'Neills were members of the Corpus Christi parish in Bolton Hill. This church was originally called the Jenkins Memorial Church, one of a very few "memorial" Catholic churches in the U.S. dedicated to an individual or family. The Jenkins family was a socially prominent, wealthy old Maryland family.

A devout Catholic, O'Neill was said to attend Mass daily, and he became close friends with Archbishop (later Cardinal) James Gibbons, the best-known American Catholic leader in the early 20th century. One report has an employee of O'Neill's store recalling that the Cardinal would occasionally walk up Charles Street from the Basilica of the Assumption to visit with O'Neill.

O'Neill's ambition was matched by a personality of considerable charm. His bright red hair earned him the nickname "Pinky". He was known for standing at the front door of his store, attired in an elegant morning suit, greeting his customers by name and ensuring that each received outstanding service. He apparently retained a touch of Irish blarney and a hint of brogue throughout his life.

O'Neill became a prominent business leader in Baltimore, serving on many professional committees to advance the city's business interests. He made most of his fortune by astute real estate investments in the city center, including building The Professional Building at 329 North Charles Street. After his death, when the bulk of his estate was handed to the Archdiocese of Baltimore and held for decades until building of the new Cathedral began in the mid 1950s, the records held in the AOB archives show the O'Neill trust included multiple properties throughout the city.

O'Neill was also a generous donor to multiple causes, the majority connected to the Catholic Church, such as St. Mary's Industrial School, but also for organizations such as the Maryland School for the Blind. The Memorial Chapel in the Cathedral of Mary Our Queen includes an image of O'Neill in one window, holding his prayer book and a copy of his will, (the other is located in the corridor leading to the Sacristy) and a painting behind the altar that reflects elements of O'Neill's life, including the 1904 fire threatening his store, and two famous alumni of St. Mary's, Babe Ruth and Al Jolson.

== Death ==
After returning from Passion (now called Palm) Sunday Mass on April 6, 1919, O'Neill suffered a stroke. He died that evening at home. His funeral was held at Corpus Christi on Wednesday, April 9, and was attended by hundreds. His death and funeral prompted extensive coverage in the local papers.
