= St. Charles College (Maryland) =

Historic district in Maryland, US

- St. Charles College Historic District (Boundary Increase)
- U.S. National Register of Historic Places
- U.S. Historic district
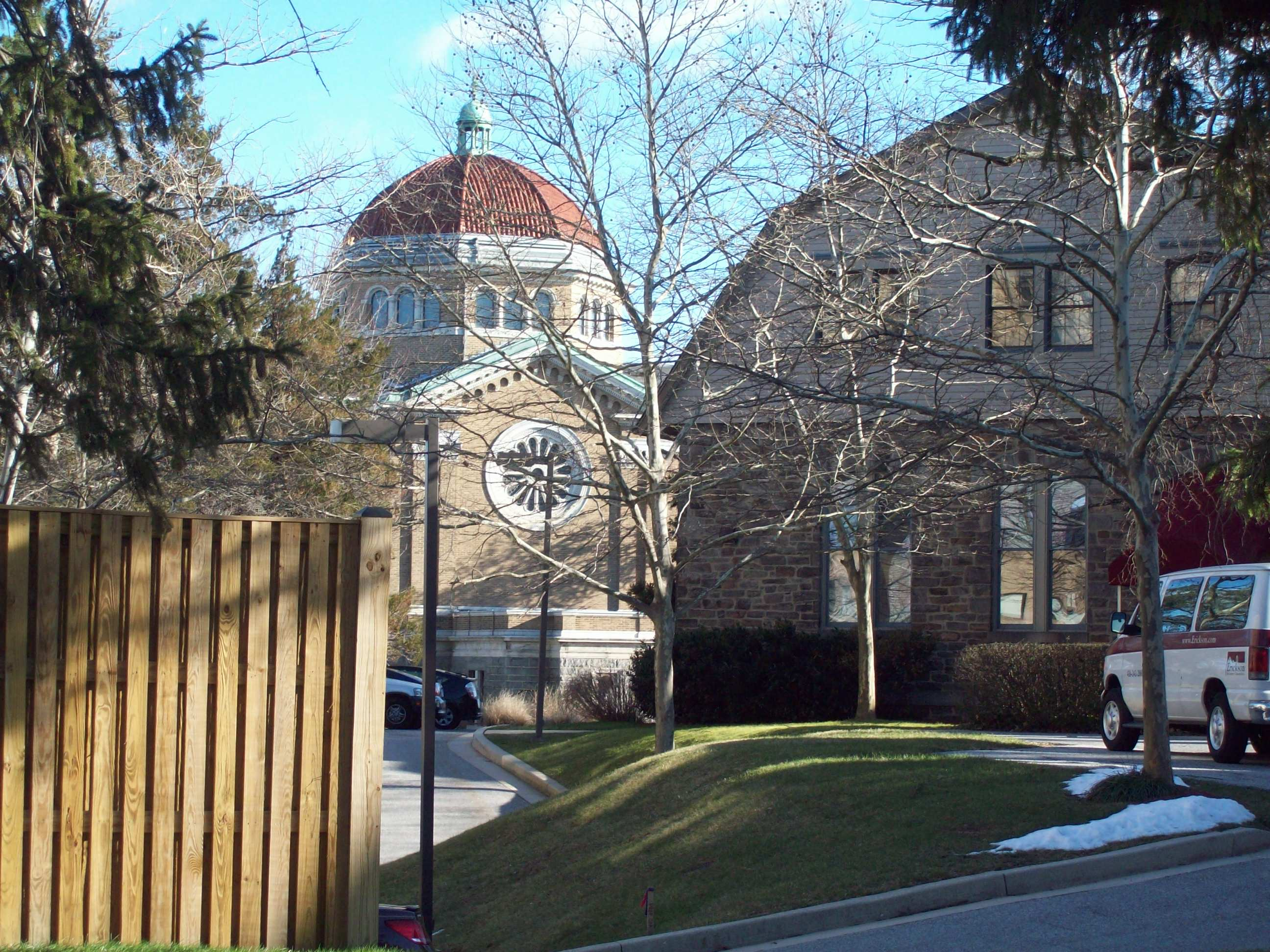
- St. Charles College Historic District, December 2009

- Location within Maryland Location within the United States
- Location: 711 Maiden Choice La., Catonsville, Maryland
- Coordinates: 39°16′6″N 76°42′3″W
- Area: 15 acres (6.1 ha), boundary increase 11 acres (4.5 ha)
- NRHP reference No.: 83002945, boundary increase 87002181
- Added to NRHP: September 30, 1983, boundary increase December 29, 1987

St. Charles College was a minor seminary in Catonsville, Maryland, originally located in Ellicott City, Maryland.

== History ==
Charles Carroll of Carrollton (1737–1832) was a signer of the Declaration of Independence for Maryland. One of the wealthiest men in the Americas at that time and a newly elected delegate to the Second Continental Congress and the only Catholic to vote on independence and sign the document, Carroll staked his fortune on the American Revolution. After the Revolution, Carroll became president of the Maryland Senate in the General Assembly and divided his time between the family mansion and estate Doughoregan Manor in western Anne Arundel County (later Howard County), near Ellicott Mills on the upper Patapsco River, and Annapolis. One of his most important tasks he said was when he helped lay the "first stone" for the new technology of transportation, the Baltimore and Ohio Railroad on Independence Day, July 4, 1828, west of the city near modern Halethorpe. At his death in 1832, he was the last surviving signer of the Declaration of Independence and was laid to rest with other Carrolls in the crypt at the family chapel at Doughoregan.

In 1784, Charles bought Marys Lott, a 75-acre (30 ha) farm from Jacob Burgoon, a Catholic immigrant from Alsace-Lorraine, France, who came to America in about 1745 and settled in Elkridge, Maryland. Jacob and his wife Elizabeth were indentured servants, Jacob working as a cordwainer (shoemaker). They had bought Marys Lott in 1762. They had eight children, and after selling Marys Lott they moved to a farm in what is now Carroll County, Maryland. Marys Lott became part of the land later given for St. Charles College.

Ambrose Maréchal (1764–1828), the future third Archbishop of Baltimore, and other Sulpician priests were frequent guests at Doughoregan, saying Mass there often and gaining the ear of the Charles Carroll. During subsequent years a request of land was made for a minor seminary. Carroll, however, denied the request because he felt he could not break up or donate any part of his patrimony.

In 1830, Emily Caton MacTavish, favorite granddaughter of the Signer and sister of the "Three American Graces", convinced Carroll to give 253 acres (1.02 km^{2}) to the Sulpician Fathers for the erection of a minor seminary — Saint Charles. She accomplished this by suggesting he donate land that he had bought during his lifetime. Included was Mary's Lott, aptly named for a gift to the Church, thought Carroll at the time. The college was incorporated on February 3, 1830, with the name "St. Charles" chosen for its benefactor, Charles Carroll.

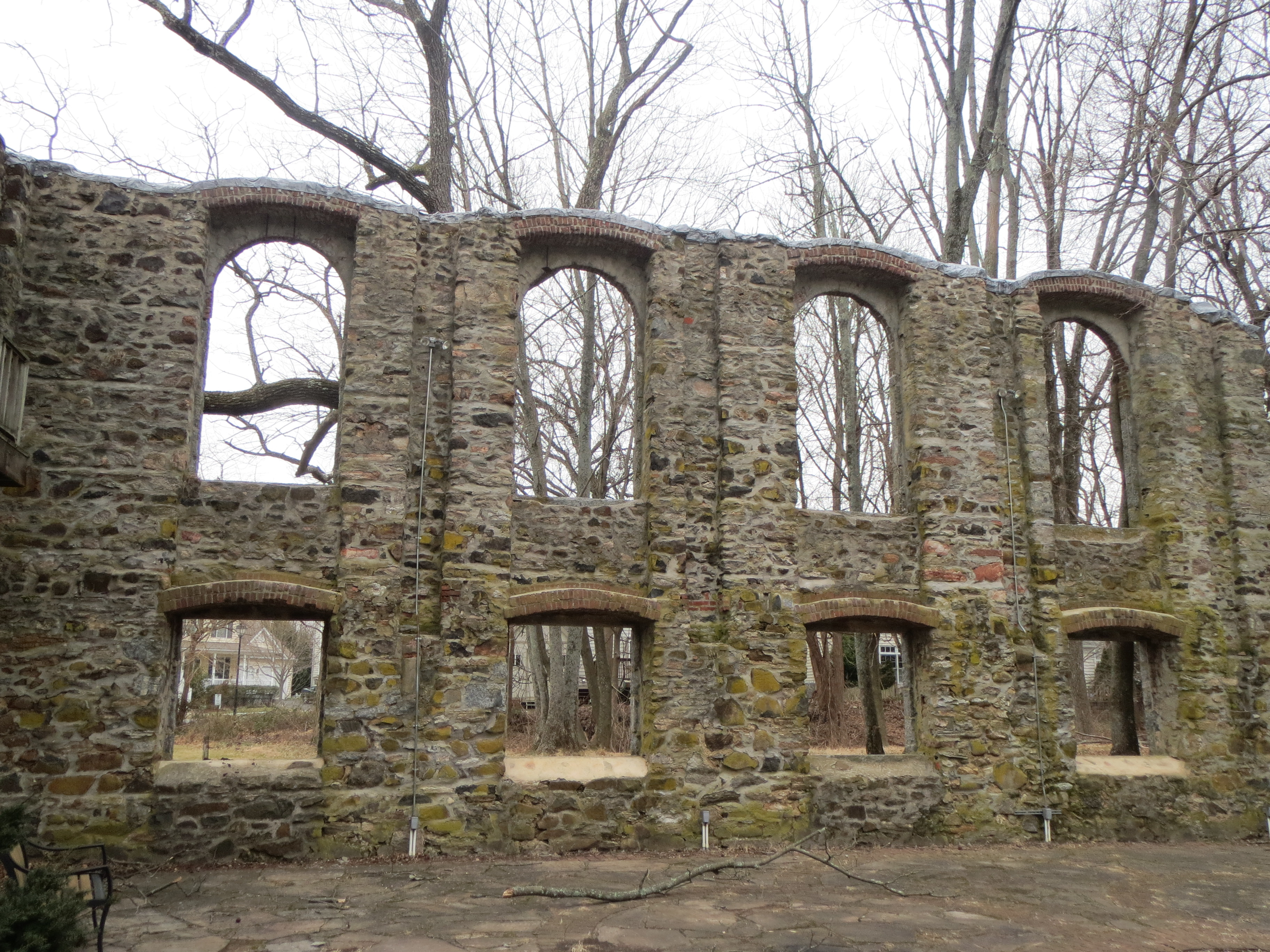
Ruins of the 1906 recreation hall

Construction started on the college building in 1831. The building would reach a size of 367 feet (112 m) in length, with 15 1/2-foot-tall (4.7 m) ceilings using gas lighting and radiant heat.

The first building of Saint Charles College (minor seminary) was completed in 1848, and the college opened on October 31 with two faculty: the president, Father Oliver Jenkins; a deacon, Edward Caton; and four students.

Two wings were added in 1859 and blessed by Francis Patrick Kenrick, Archbishop of the Archdiocese of Baltimore. "Our Lady of the Angels Chapel" was started at this time, but completion was delayed by the Civil War until 1866. An imitation of the Sainte-Chapelle in Paris, the building was 110 feet (34 m) long, 34 feet (10 m) wide and 50 feet (15 m) high. It was lavishly decorated mainly through the generosity of its first rector and president, Father Oliver Jenkins.

Two additional wings were added to the building in 1878 for a 190-person enrollment.

In 1898 a vastly enlarged Saint Charles College celebrated its 50th anniversary. The park-like grounds of St. Charles looked southeast towards the Frederick Road, later the eastern end of the historic National Road, the first federally sponsored interstate route begun in the early 1800s from Baltimore to Cumberland and on to the western states finally ending near the Mississippi River in Vandalia, Illinois, then the territorial capital of the Territory of Illinois. In later years the college would overlook Wilkens Avenue, which also runs southwestward out of the city near the intersection of Maiden Choice Lane.

On March 16, 1911, disaster struck: the college was completely destroyed by a fire that began in the chapel cellar. None of the 200+ faculty and students were killed or injured. Sacred vessels and vestments, along with thousands of priceless manuscripts and books were lost. The burned-out shell was pulled down, and the salvageable building materials were transported to Catonsville, where the college was quickly rebuilt. All that remained were standing ruins of the 1906 Recreation Hall. (Note: See and .)

After the fire, the heirs of the Carroll family requested that the 250 acres (100 ha) of land be returned, since it was not then used as a college, by selling off the land and dividing the profits among the family. The area was purchased by Howard County Planning Board member William Phillip Brendel, who ran Brendel Manor Park opening in 1942. Brendel's Manor Park (also known as Gospel Park) hosted the first Howard County Fair onsite in 1946 and 1950, with prison labor used to build structures. In the early 1970s, it was the home of Robert G. Millar's Christian Identity community. It has since been upzoned and developed into a suburban housing community. The property was subdivided several times, with Robert J. Lanceolott and Synergy Development Corp. developing over the historic ruins of the first college buildings in 1991 to build the "Terra Maria Community". The ruins of the old minor seminary's recreation hall and laundry are now located in the middle of Terra Maria Way circle with the grotto removed for a storm water retention pond.(39.287713°N 76.887635°W)

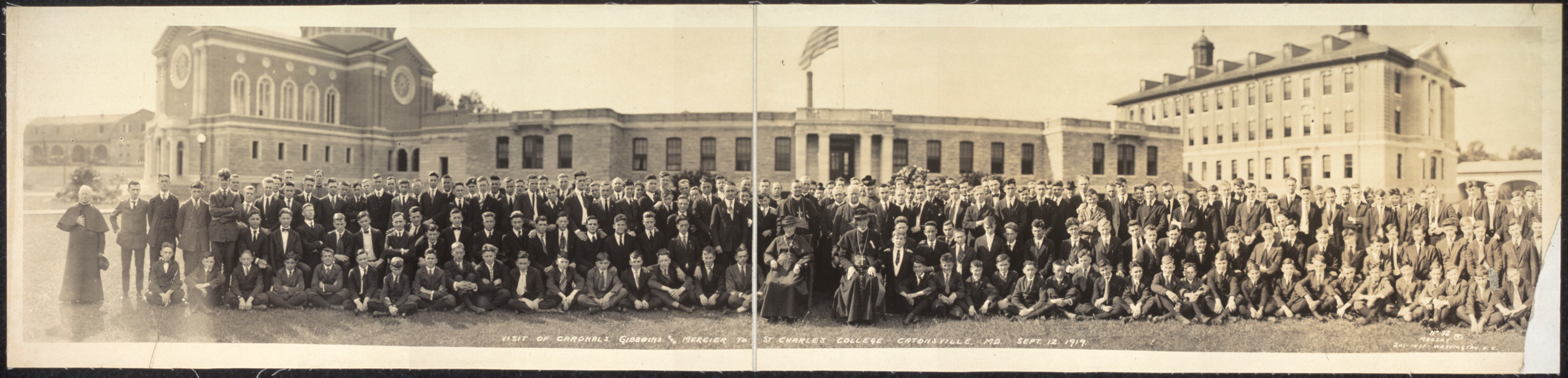
Cardinals James Gibbons (also Archbishop of Baltimore) and Désiré-Joseph Mercier, the Primate of Belgium, visit St. Charles College on September 12, 1919, eight years after the great fire, with only the lower level of the center section completed

In 1969, St. Charles' High School Department with boarding school was closed and the junior college merged with the upper college of St. Mary's Seminary and University now on Roland Avenue and Belvedere Avenue/Northern Parkway in the Roland Park neighborhood of north Baltimore (having moved there from North Paca Street by St. Mary's Street in the old Seton Hill neighborhood to new landmark buildings of Beaux Arts/Classical Revival style architecture on a new expansive park-like campus in 1929). The old St. Charles second campus was renamed "St. Mary's Seminary College" and continued its educational programs, now opened up to ecumenical participation.

In 1977, the college closed and the property was sold to Erickson Retirement Communities, Inc.; it is presently known as Charlestown Retirement Community.

== St. Charles College Historic District ==
St. Charles College Historic District is a historic Catholic church seminary and national historic district at Catonsville, Baltimore County, Maryland, United States. The main complex consists of six interconnected buildings, three of which form the central group: Chapel, Administration Building, and Old Dormitory. Each has a rusticated stone first floor and upper levels of buff brick with stone trim in the Italian Renaissance style. The complex includes three additional buildings: the Dining Hall, connected by a passageway; the Convent, physically attached to the Dining Hall, and the Power House. The chapel, designed by Murphy & Olmsted of Washington, D.C., was known as “Our Lady of the Angels” and was the gift of the Jenkins family, who also built Corpus Christi Church in Baltimore. It houses a pipe-organ built by Casavant Frères in 1919, its Opus. 808. The historic Casavant pipe organ was played in recital during the Organ Historical Society Convention in July 2024.

It was added to the National Register of Historic Places in 1983.

== Notable alumni ==
- Patrick Joseph Byrne, Maryknoll missionary who served as Apostolic Delegate to Korea
- John F. Collins (1872–1962), Mayor of Providence, Rhode Island 1939–1941
- George Sterling, poet and playwright
- Thomas Frederick Price, cofounder of Maryknoll
- John Surratt, conspirator in the assassination plot of 16th President Abraham Lincoln in 1865
- Louis J. Weichmann
- Venerable Aloysius Philip Schwartz, American Catholic priest, missionary, and founder of the Sisters of Mary
