= Phillips Library =

Phillips Library may refer to:

- Phillips Library (Massachusetts), a rare books and special collections library part of the Peabody Essex Museum (PEM).
- Phillips Library, a building on the campus of Aurora University
- Phillips Library, a building on the campus of The Orme School
- John Phillips Library, a building at the Kingswood campus of Western Sydney University
- Phillips Free Public Library in Phillipston, Massachusetts
- Phillips Memorial Library, a building on the campus of Providence College (Rhode Island)
