= Gley =

Gley may refer to:

- Eugène Gley (1857–1930), French physiologist and endocrinologist
- Gleysol, a type of hydric soil

== See also ==
- Glay (disambiguation)
