= Glay (disambiguation) =

Glay is a Japanese rock band.

Glay may also refer to:

- Glay (album), a 2010 album by Glay
- Glay, Doubs, a commune in France
- Marcel Le Glay (1920–1992), French historian and archaeologist
- Maurice Le Glay (1868–1936), French Army officer and author
- George Albert Glay, author of the 1955 novel Oath Of Seven, an Ace single volume
- Glay, a fictional character in the 1973 novel Trullion: Alastor 2262 by Jack Vance
- Glay Field, an athletic field at Providence College in Rhode Island, United States
