= List of Providence College buildings =

The following is a list of the buildings on the campus of Providence College located in Providence, Rhode Island.

== Academic and administrative buildings ==
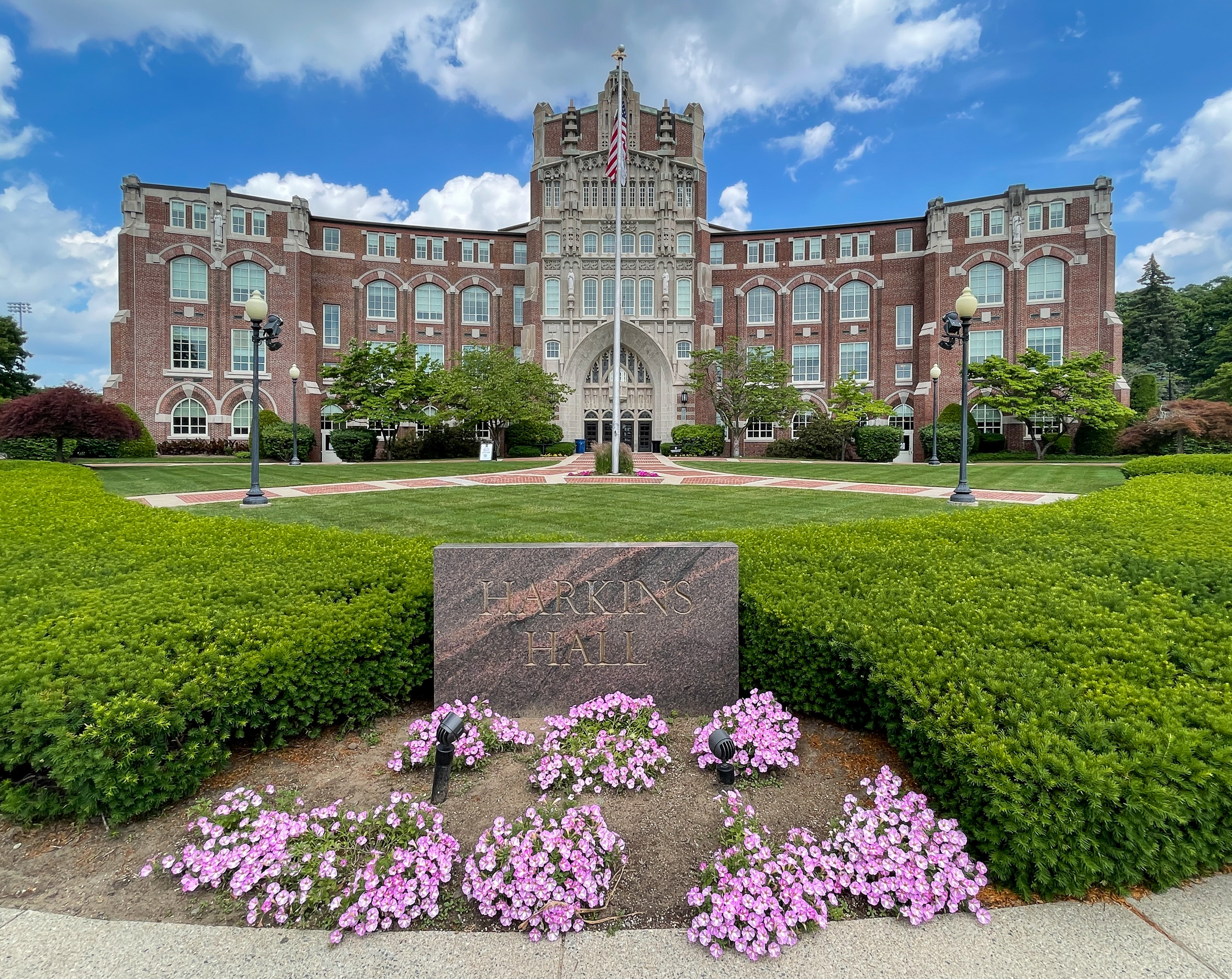
Harkins Hall

- Bishop Harkins Hall - Named for Bishop Matthew Harkins, the man responsible for the school's founding, Harkins is the school's original property and signature building (an image of one of its stained glass windows is used as the college's logo). Built in 1917 and annexed in 1929, the building houses the college's administrative offices, the Education department as well as classroom space on the third and fourth floors, a small chapel, the Blackfriars Theatre (the former main theater for the school, built in the school's original gymnatorium) and several other offices. The building faces the main entrance at Cunningham Square.

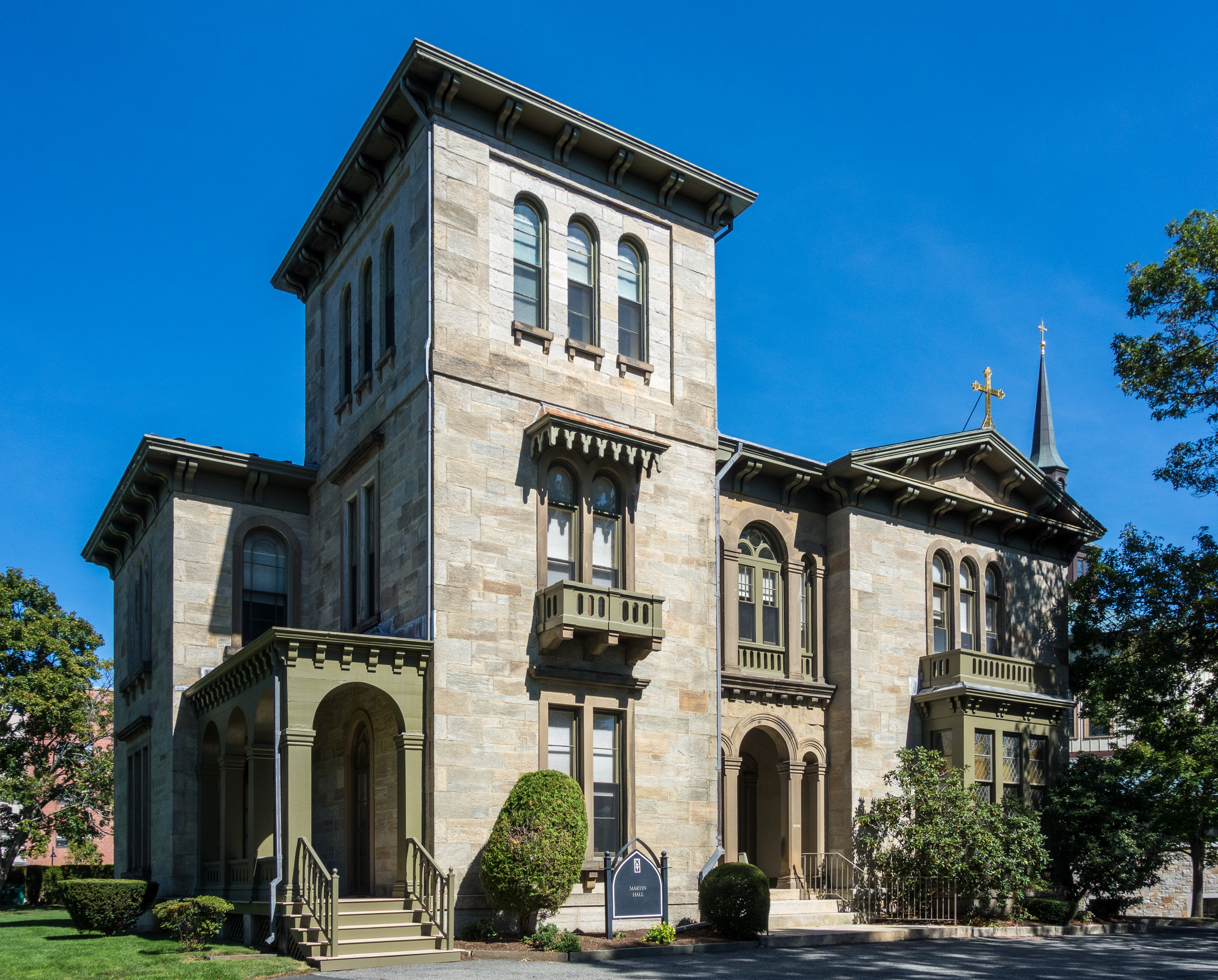
Martin Hall

- Saint Martin Hall - Designed by Thomas Tefft and built in 1850 as the George M. Bradley House, the building was purchased by the college in 1926. It was expanded to include a large dorm to its rear, and the entire building was dedicated as Guzman Hall, named for Saint Dominic de Guzmán, founder of the Dominican Order. It housed pre-ecclesiastical students for most of its life as a dorm. In 1962, a new Guzman Hall was opened next to Dominic House, and the building was restored to its original configuration, making room for neighboring McDermott Hall. It was renamed at that time for Saint Martin de Porres. Until 1994 it was the home of the College President. Currently it serves as the Office of Institutional Advancement.

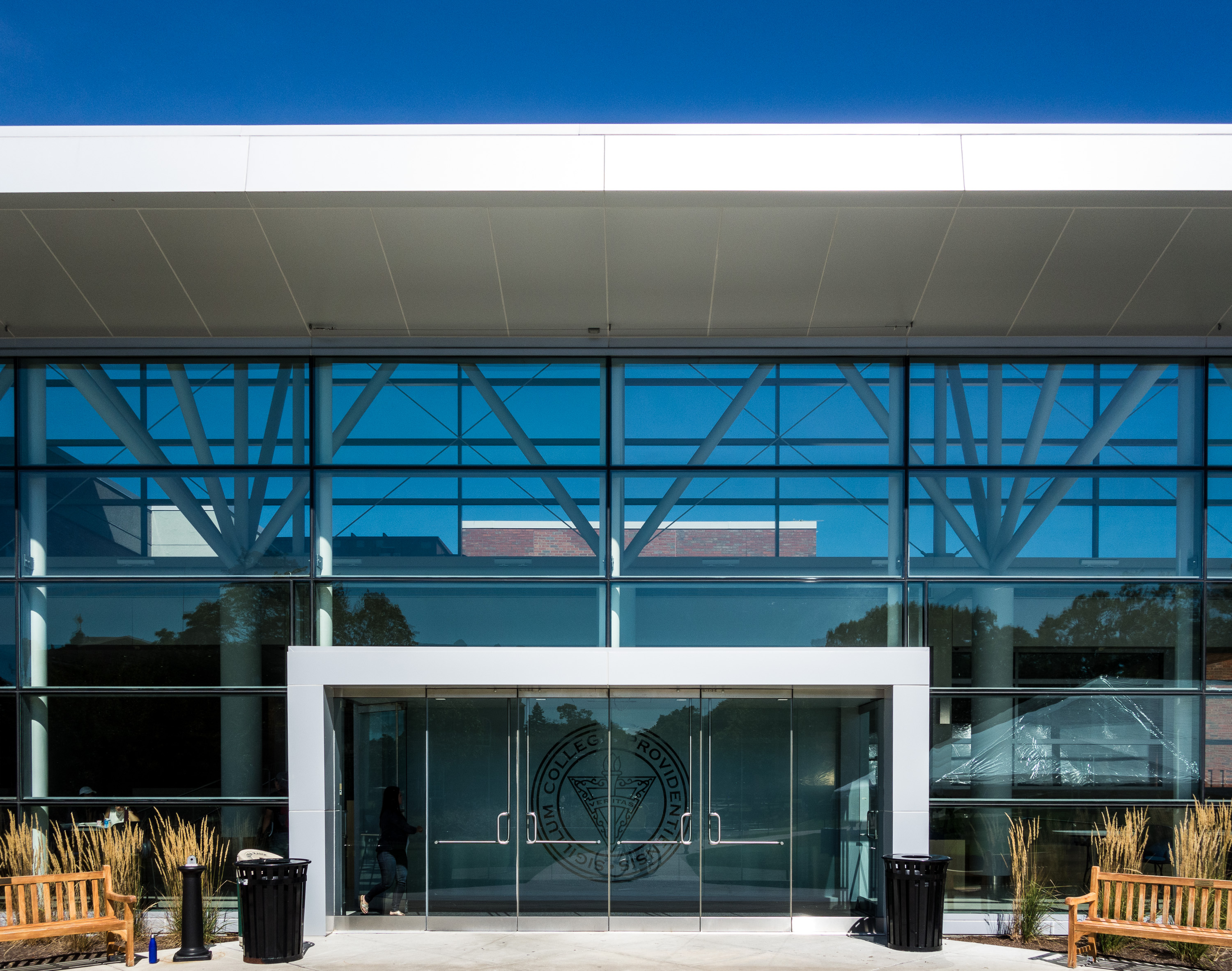
Slavin Center

- Slavin Center - The school's student union, which includes the school bookstore, McPhail's Entertainment Center, a large meeting hall (Class of '64 Hall), the studios of WDOM, 91.3FM, the school's radio station, the offices for the Board of Programmers, Board of Multicultural Student Affairs (BMSA), Friars Club, Veritas, the Cowl, Student Congress and other various student organizations. It was named for the former college President, the Rev. Robert J. Slavin, O.P. '28, and is connected to Alumni Hall and the Concannon Center.

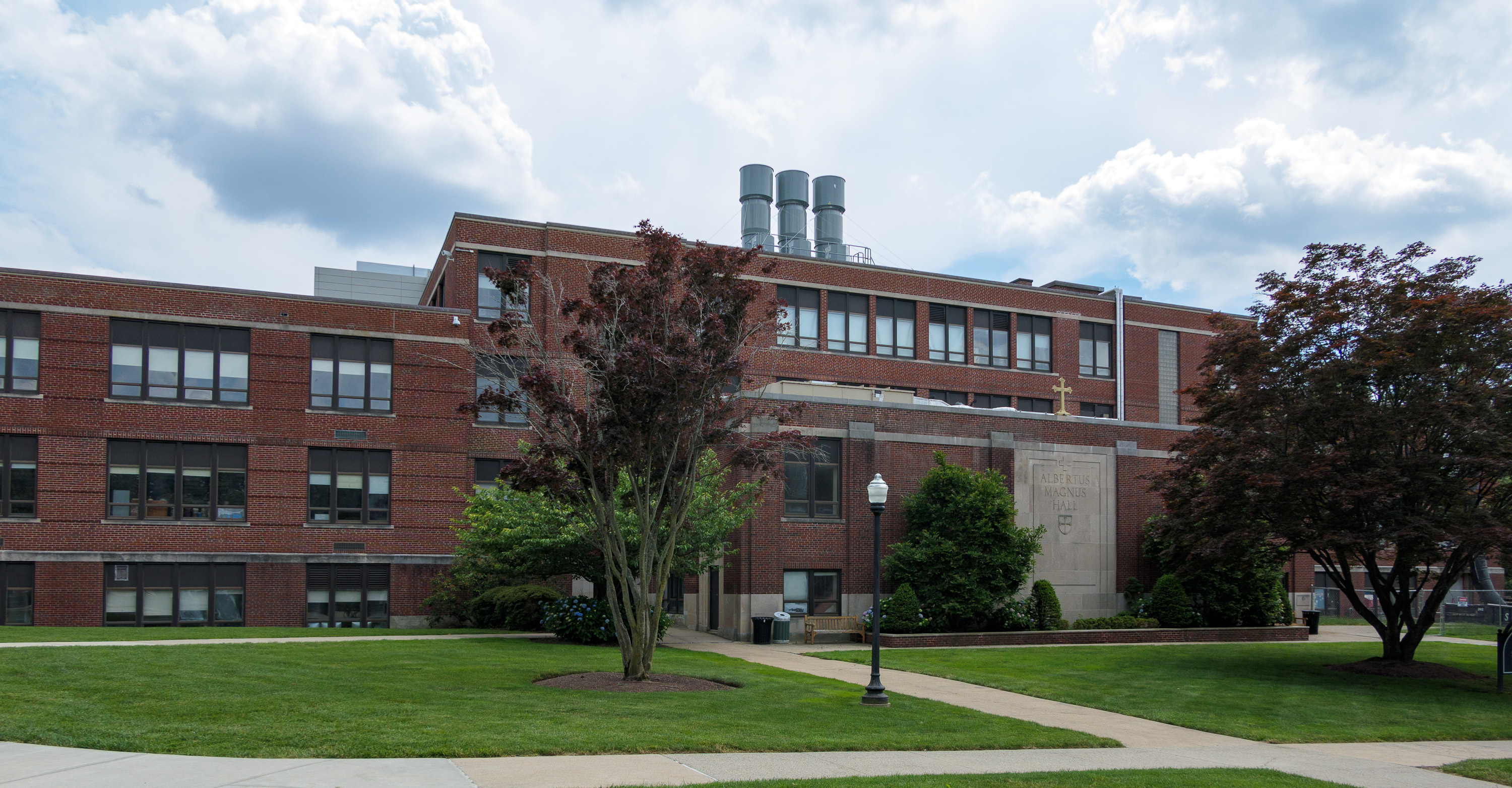
Albertus Magnus Hall

- Albertus Magnus Hall, Hickey Hall, and Sowa Hall - the science complex, located at the southwest corner of campus. Its three component buildings are:
  - Albertus Magnus Hall was opened in 1948 and houses the main science classrooms;
  - Hickey Hall was opened in 1962 and houses smaller advanced laboratory space and is named for Rev. Edward J. Hickey, O.P., a former science professor;
  - Sowa Hall was opened in 1989 to link the two buildings; it is named for its benefactor, Ferdinand B. Sowa '48, a local lawyer, Sowa mostly houses the science department offices.
- Moore Hall - The building was opened in 1947 as Antoninus Hall, and was home of the business department and several classrooms and labs. In 1988, it was remodeled and expanded to include three large lecture halls and several classrooms, all for use by the Development of Western Civilization Program. The remodeling was funded by the estate of Cornelius C. Moore, a Newport lawyer, and was named in his honor. Upon the completion of the Ruane Center for the Humanities, the Development of Western Civilization Program was moved out of Moore Hall.
- Accinno Hall - The school's main computer science building opened in 1992 and was named for benefactor John Accinno '46. It located on the west side of Huxley Avenue in a renovated former construction garage, originally part of the Good Shepherd property.

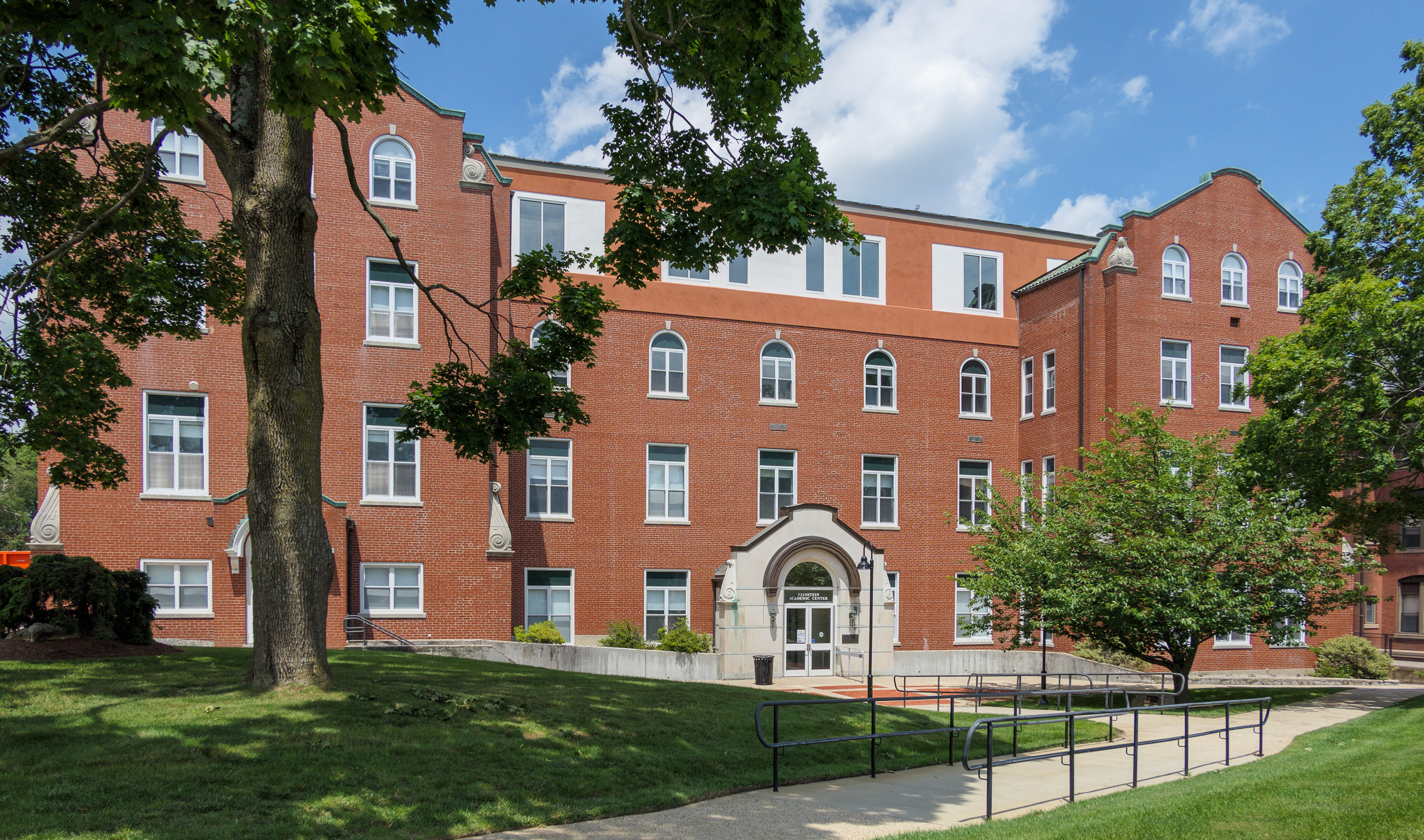
Feinstein Academic Center

- The Feinstein Academic Center - Along with Saint Joseph's Hall, Saint Dominic Hall and what is now Accinno Hall, it is one of the buildings acquired from the Good Shepherd convent property in 1955. Originally named Stephen Hall for the Rev. Terrence Stephen McDermott, O.P., the Dominican Provincial from 1930–55, it was used as dormitories until 1993, when it was renovated and expanded. Reopened in the fall of 1994 and named for Alan Shawn Feinstein, the building now houses classrooms, offices and a small reception hall, and is located between Saint Joseph's and Aquinas Halls near the center of campus.

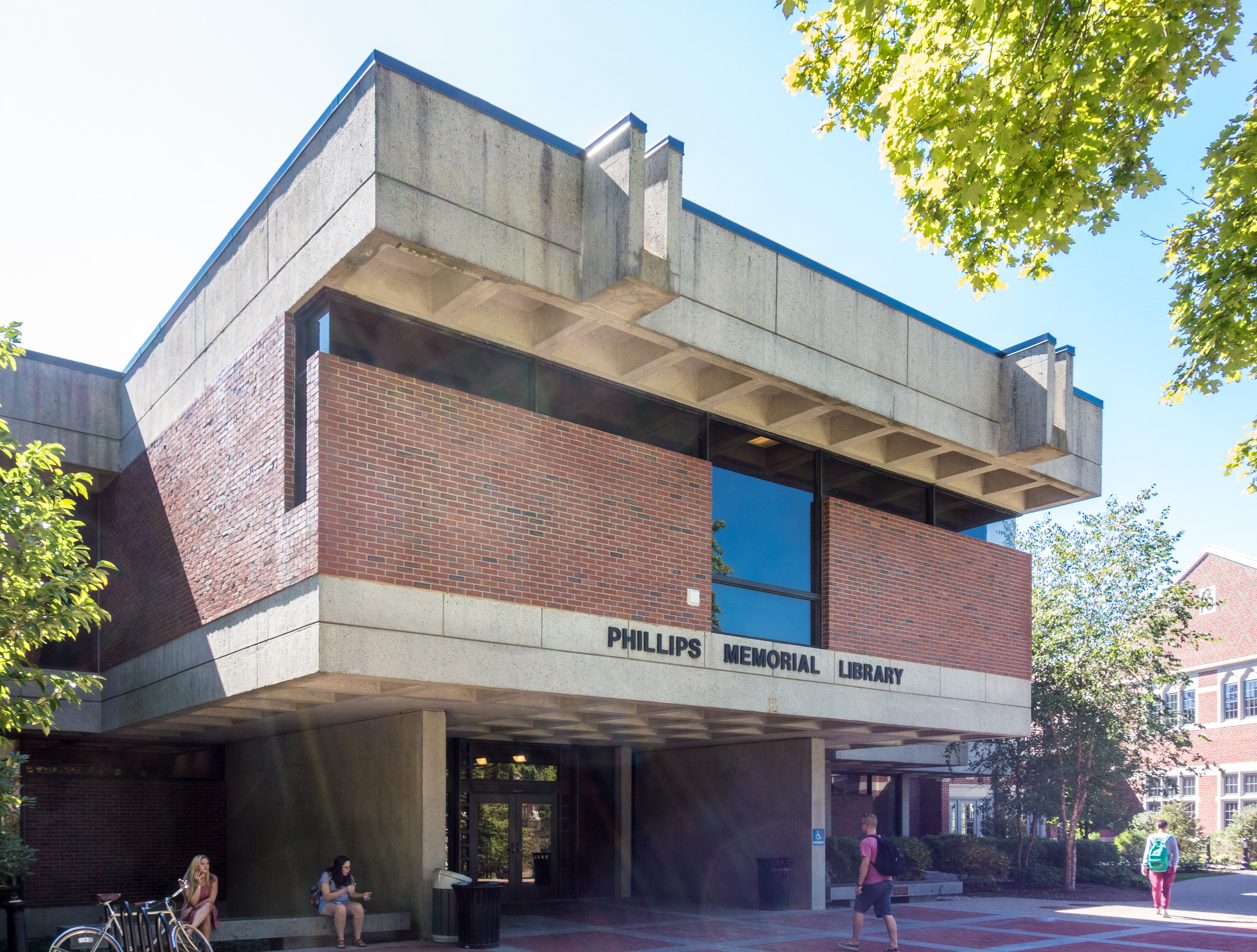
Phillips Memorial Library

- Phillips Memorial Library - The school's primary library, it was opened in 1969, and has over 3,000,000 volumes. The Providence College Archives and Special Collections department is located in the Lower Level. The building is located along Eaton Street, between the science buildings and the residential quad, and was named by benefactor Mary (Phillips) Pritchard to honor her family.
- Saint Dominic Chapel - The school's main chapel, dedicated in 2001, and also the home of the school's Campus Ministry and Pastoral Service Organization. The site of the chapel is the former site of the War Memorial Grotto of Our Lady of the Rosary, a large grotto which was built in 1948 as a site for worship and a memorial to the seventy-nine alumni who died in World War II. It served for many years as the site of commencement exercises and ROTC commissionings, but was closed to make way for the chapel. There is a smaller grotto on the side of the chapel which was built with some of the materials from the original.

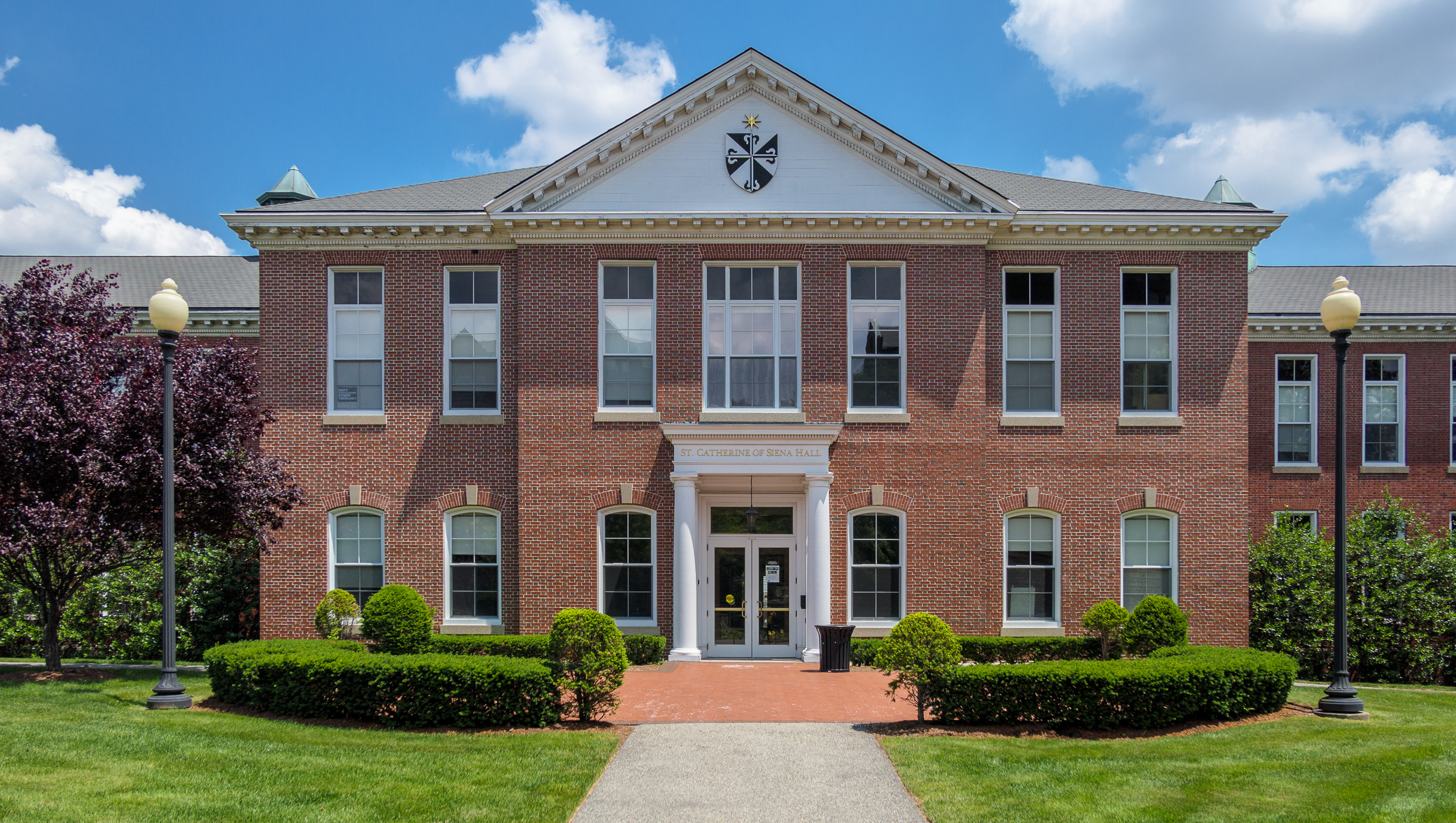
St. Catherine of Siena Hall

- Saint Catherine of Siena Hall - Formerly used for music department classrooms and performance space, now serves as the office building for the theology and philosophy departments; includes a library, chapel, and classroom space; formerly part of the Chapin Hospital property.

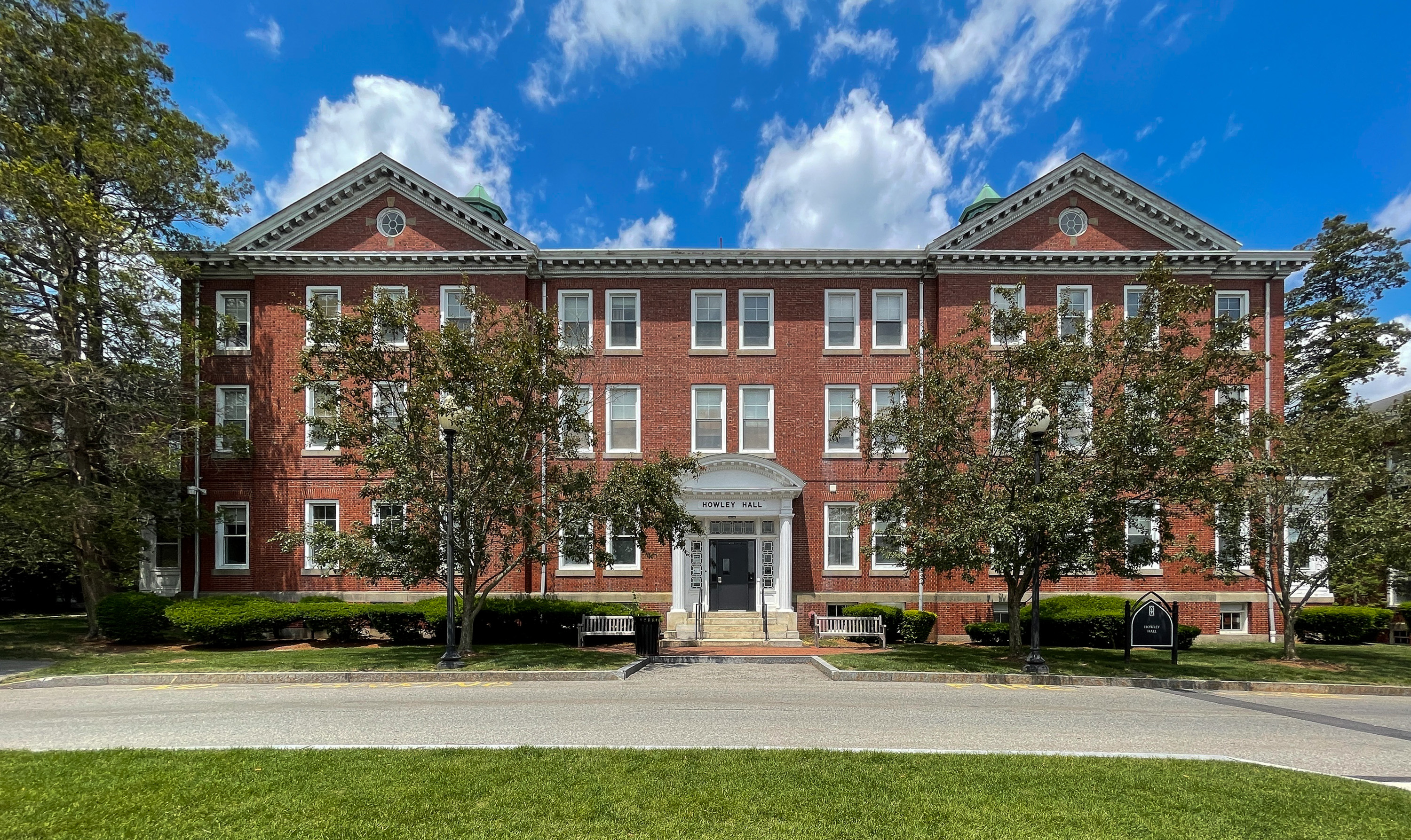
Howley Hall

- Howley Hall - Originally the central building of the Chapin Hospital property, Howley Hall (named for Rev. Francis A. Howley, O.P., an original faculty member) now houses offices for the Black Studies and Health Policy & Management programs, as well as the Political Science, Social Work, and Sociology departments. There is also an anthropology workshop and a political science data center in the building. Since 2004, Howley has been located at the high point of the new Lower Campus quad.
- Service Building - An annex to the rear of Howley Hall, the building now hosts part of the art and art history departments.
- Hunt-Cavanagh Hall - Located behind the Service Building, Hunt-Cavanagh Hall hosts galleries and other portions of the art and art history departments. It is named for Rev. Lawrence M. Hunt, O.P., an art history professor involved in the development of the department, and John Cavanagh, '35, a renowned liturgical artist and designer.

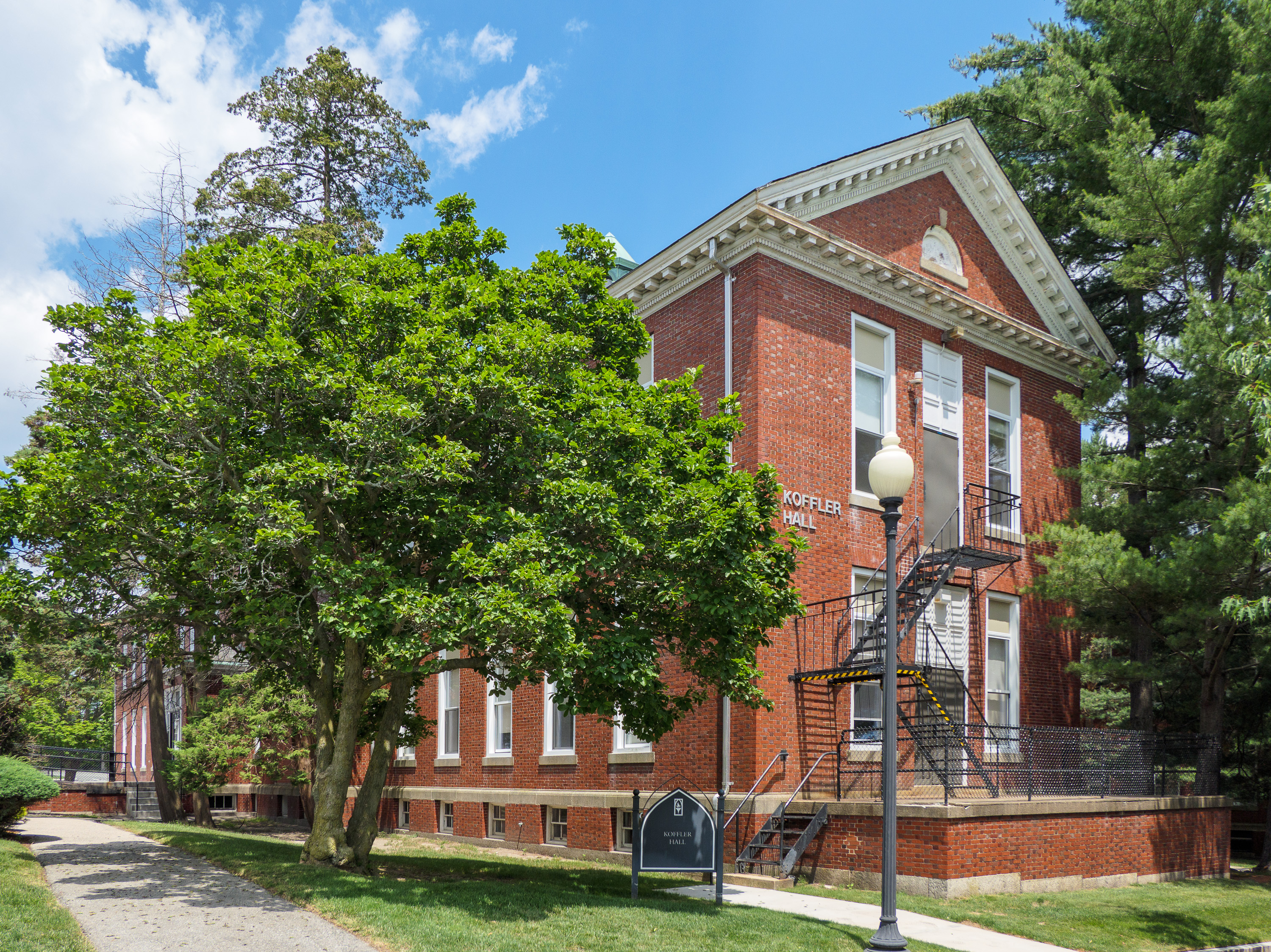
Koffler Hall

- Koffler Hall - Part of the Chapin property and originally a mirrored twin of Siena Hall (prior to that building's expansion), the building houses the departments of Accountancy, Finance, Management, and Marketing, as well as seminar rooms and a computer laboratory. It is named for Sol Koffler, a benefactor and member of the President's Council.
- Sullivan Hall - Part of the Chapin property, Sullivan Hall is the home of the Departments of Modern Languages and Economics, and also includes an office for the publication INTI, seminar rooms, and a foreign language resource center. It was the last of the Chapin properties to be renovated; originally as a dormitory (then known as Bedford Hall), and in 1994 as office space. It is named for benefactor Francis Sullivan '67.
- Ceramics Building - The easternmost of the Chapin buildings, the Ceramics Building is part of the art department, and also formerly included a dance studio.

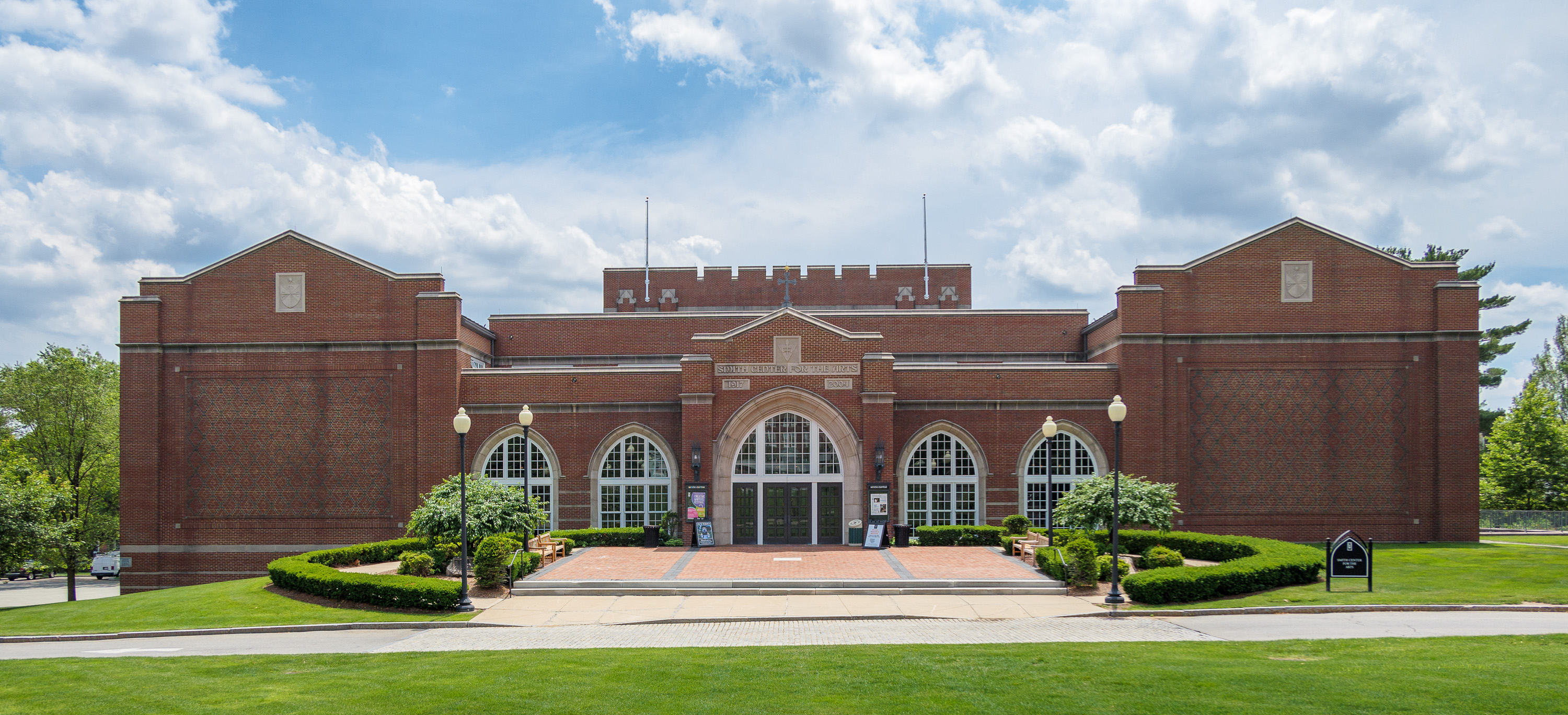
Smith Center for the Arts

- Smith Center for the Performing Arts - Home of the music and theater programs, the building also houses a theater and two recital halls. It opened in 2004, and was named for former school president Rev. Philip A. Smith O.P., and located at the southeastern corner of campus, on the former site of tennis courts and a former parking lot. The building is the anchor of the new Lower Campus quad.

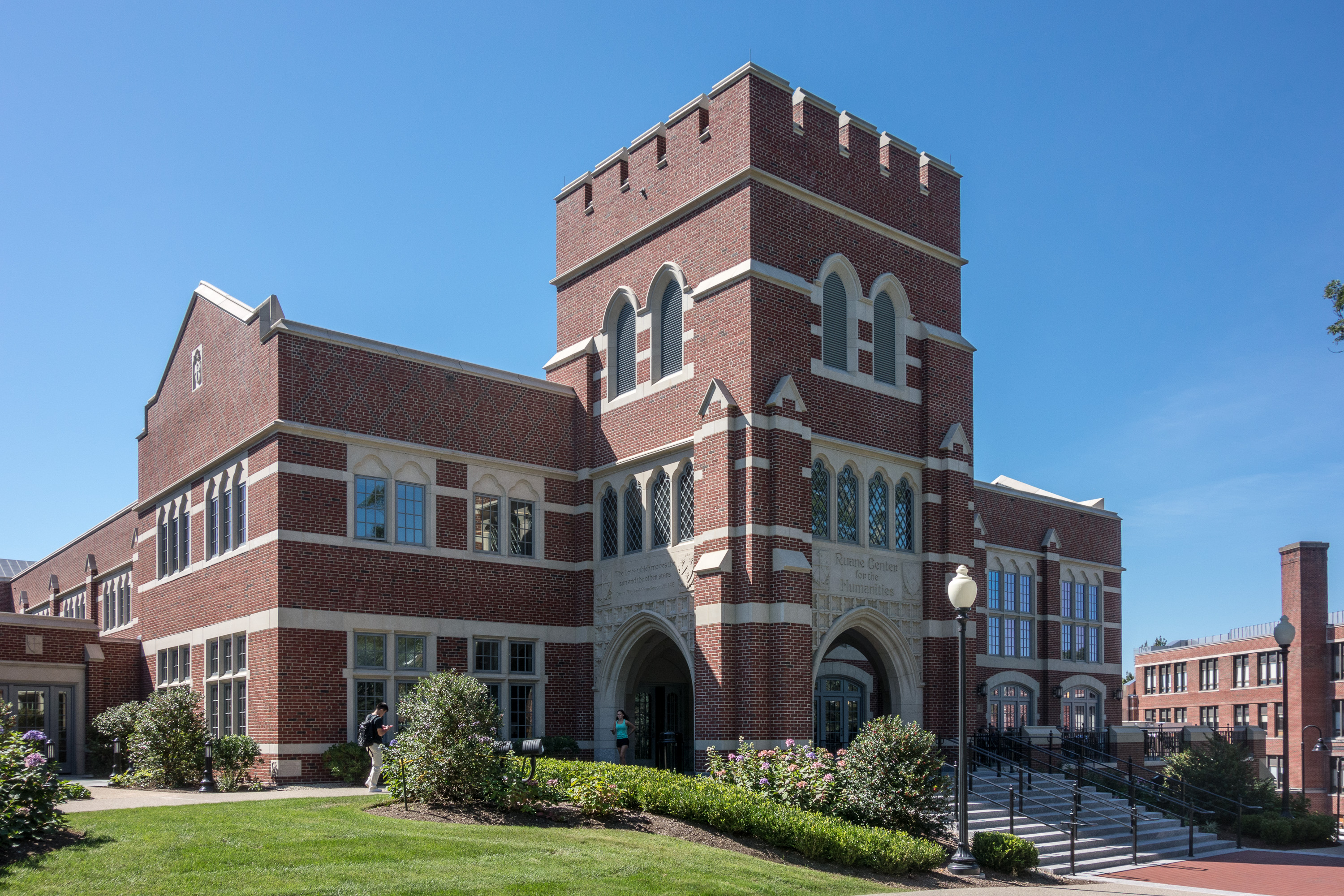
Ruane Center for the Humanities

- Ruane Center for the Humanities - Home of the History and English departments, the School of Arts and Sciences, the Liberal Arts Honors Program, and the Center for the Study of Humanities, this building serves as the instructional home of PC's signature Development of Western Civilization program and houses multiple lecture halls and small seminar rooms. PC's newest building, it opened in 2013, and was named for PC's former Board of Trustees Chairman Michael A. Ruane and his wife Elizabeth. It his located on the College’s main campus between the Phillips Memorial Library and the Albertus Magnus-Sowa-Hickey science complex. It is connected to Phillips Library by an enclosed walkway.

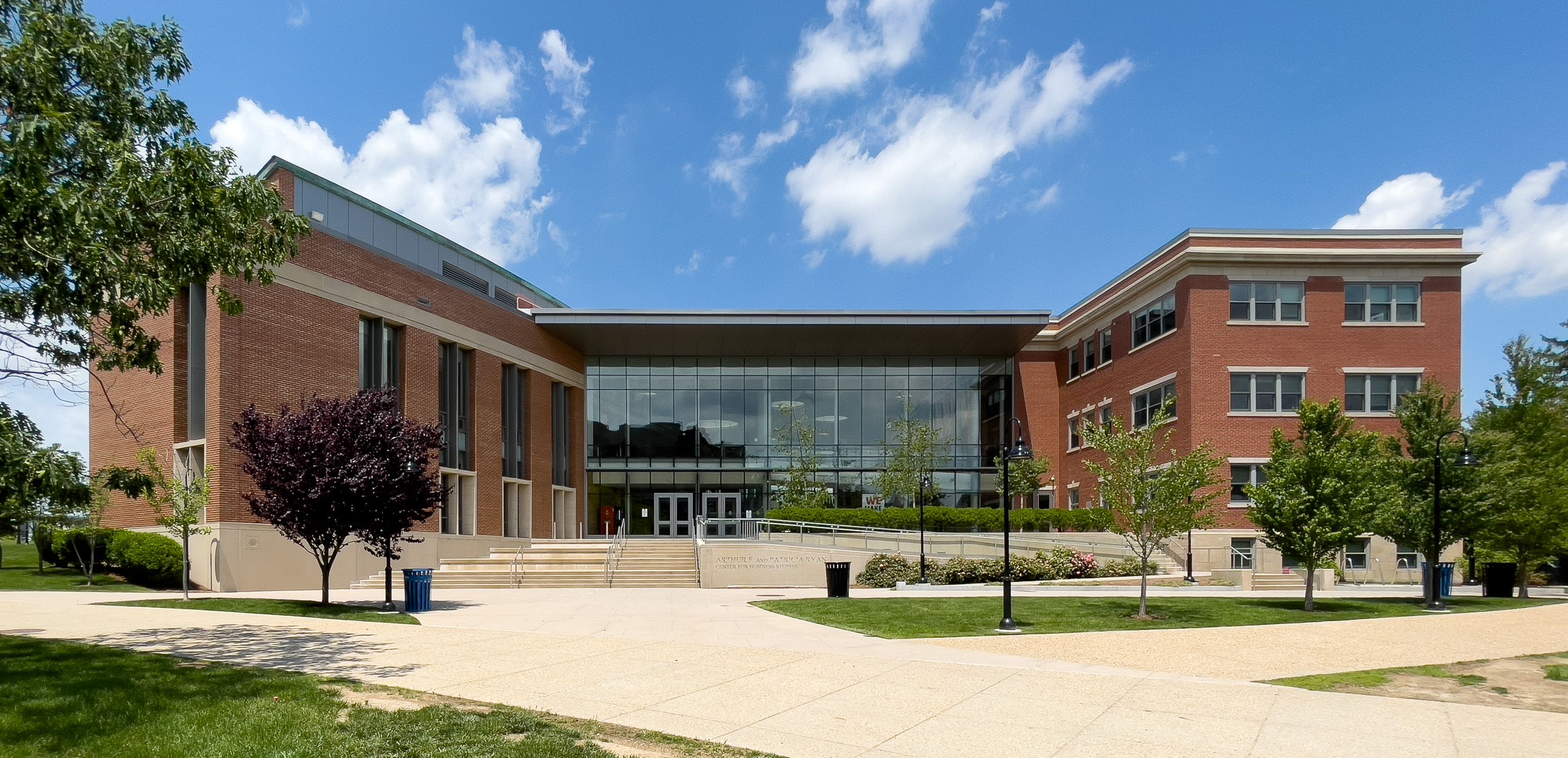
Ryan Center for Business Studies

- Ryan Center for Business Studies - home of the Providence College School of Business, opened January 2017.
- Ben Mondor Center for Nursing and Health Sciences - First opened in the Spring semester of 2025, it became the academic home for the nursing and health sciences program at Providence College. The facility includes clinical simulation and anatomy labs, a student resource center and café, as well as a chapel offered space for Mass, prayer, and reflection. It was built on the site of the old male dorm building Fennell Hall, which was demolished in the summer of 2023. The name of the new building reflects a $10 million donation by Madeleine Mondor in memory of her husband, Georges “Ben” Mondor ’04Hon., a Rhode Island industrialist and philanthropist remembered for his ownership of the Pawtucket Red Sox.

== Residential halls and apartments ==
There are eight traditional dormitories on campus:

- Aquinas Hall - Named for Saint Thomas Aquinas, and opened in 1939, Aquinas is the oldest remaining residential dormitory on campus. The building houses a large study hall and, formerly, the campus's main chapel and cafeteria. The building is the centerpiece of the residential quad, and is now co-ed (after being a female-only dorm since 1971, the first year women were admitted). The chapel was recently remodeled into the Center for Catholic and Dominican Studies.
- McDermott Hall and Meagher Hall- These two twinned dormitories are located west of Aquinas Hall on either side of the residential quad, and were built in 1965. Meagher (pronounced "Marr") is the northern of the two dorms, and was named for the Rev. James Raymond Meagher, O.P., Dominican provincial from 1913–1930, one of the key people in the founding of the college, and is now an all-female dorm after being male for many years. McDermott is the southern of the two dorms, located on the site of the original Guzman Hall (see below), and was named for the Rev. Terrence Stephen McDermott, O.P., Meagher's successor as provincial, and is an all-male dorm.
- McVinney Hall - Located to the north of Meagher Hall, the ten-story McVinney Hall opened in 1970 and sits atop Smith Hill, affording residents of the highest views in the city of Providence. The dormitory is named for Rev. Russell McVinney, the fifth Bishop of the Diocese of Providence and bishop at the time of the building's completion. It is an all-female dormitory.
- Saint Joseph Hall - Along with its neighbor, the Feinstein Academic Center, this building was originally a part of the Good Shepherd property before reopening in 1955 as a dormitory. This all-male dormitory, long the home of the men's basketball team and, formerly, WDOM, is also home of the Department of Theology and the Office of Residence Life.
- Raymond Hall - Home to the school's cafeteria and, since 1997, the school's post office, Raymond Hall opened in 1959. Above the cafeteria is an all-male dormitory. The building, named for Saint Raymond, is located near the center of campus, with the Huxley Gate facing its eastern corner.
- Guzman Hall - This all-male dormitory, located just west of Huxley Avenue was opened in 1962, and contains a small chapel. It replaced its namesake dormitory (likewise named for Saint Dominic de Guzmán, but also usually colloquially pronounced gʌz-mæn), the first dormitory on campus, and like its predecessor originally housed pre-ecclesiastical students.
  View from 4th Floor Shanley Window
  There is one unique semi-suite building on campus, built specifically for sophomore students. Each room consists of a four-person unit with two two-person bedrooms, and a connected corridor where the sink is located, with separate rooms for a shower and bathroom. The second floor of the building contains common study rooms as well as a lounge and a kitchen.
- Shanley Hall - First opened for the 2023 Fall semester, Shanley is a co-ed semi-suite building that houses sophomores, located on the campus' southern border with Eaton Street. It was named after the college’s 12th president, Rev. Brian J. Shanley, O.P. ’80, it was the first new residence hall built since McCarthy Hall opened in 2004. It is

There are three apartment buildings on the Upper Campus, all of which are six-person units (divided into three two-person bedrooms), and all of which were completed in 1988 near the corner of Huxley Avenue and Eaton Street on the Upper Campus side. Their completion was partially funded with money from the men's basketball team's 1987 Final Four appearance:

- Cunningham Hall was named in 1994 for Rev. John C. Cunningham, O.P., '50, upon his stepping down as tenth President of the college.
- DiTraglia Hall was named in 1990 for Frank DiTraglia, M.D., J.D., '40, a major benefactor of the college.
- Mal Brown Hall was named in 1992 for Malcolm Hollis "Mal" Brown, '33, a former athletic trainer who died in 1939 during a typhoid outbreak.

There are three apartment buildings on the Lower Campus along Huxley Avenue, both finished in 1994 with four-person units divided into two two-person bedrooms.

- McCarthy Hall - completed in 2004 along with the Smith Center, is a hybrid of the apartment and dormitory setup. Like the apartments, dormitory rooms share common living areas in groups; however, they do not have full kitchens. It is part of the new Lower Campus quad. Formerly known as Suites Hall, was renamed on October 1, 2021 in dedication to Trustee John R. McCarthy ’86, ’22P, ’23P and Amy C. McCarthy.
- Davis Hall was named for benefactor William Davis, '52, and has a small chapel dedicated to Saint Martin de Porres in the basement.
- Bedford Hall was named for former benefactor and trustee Howard Bedford. The Student Health Center is located in the basement, as well as the Personal Counseling Center, in the original location of McPhail's night club (then called Stuart's). (This is the second building on campus named for Bedford; his name previously graced Sullivan Hall while it was a dormitory.)

== Athletic facilities ==
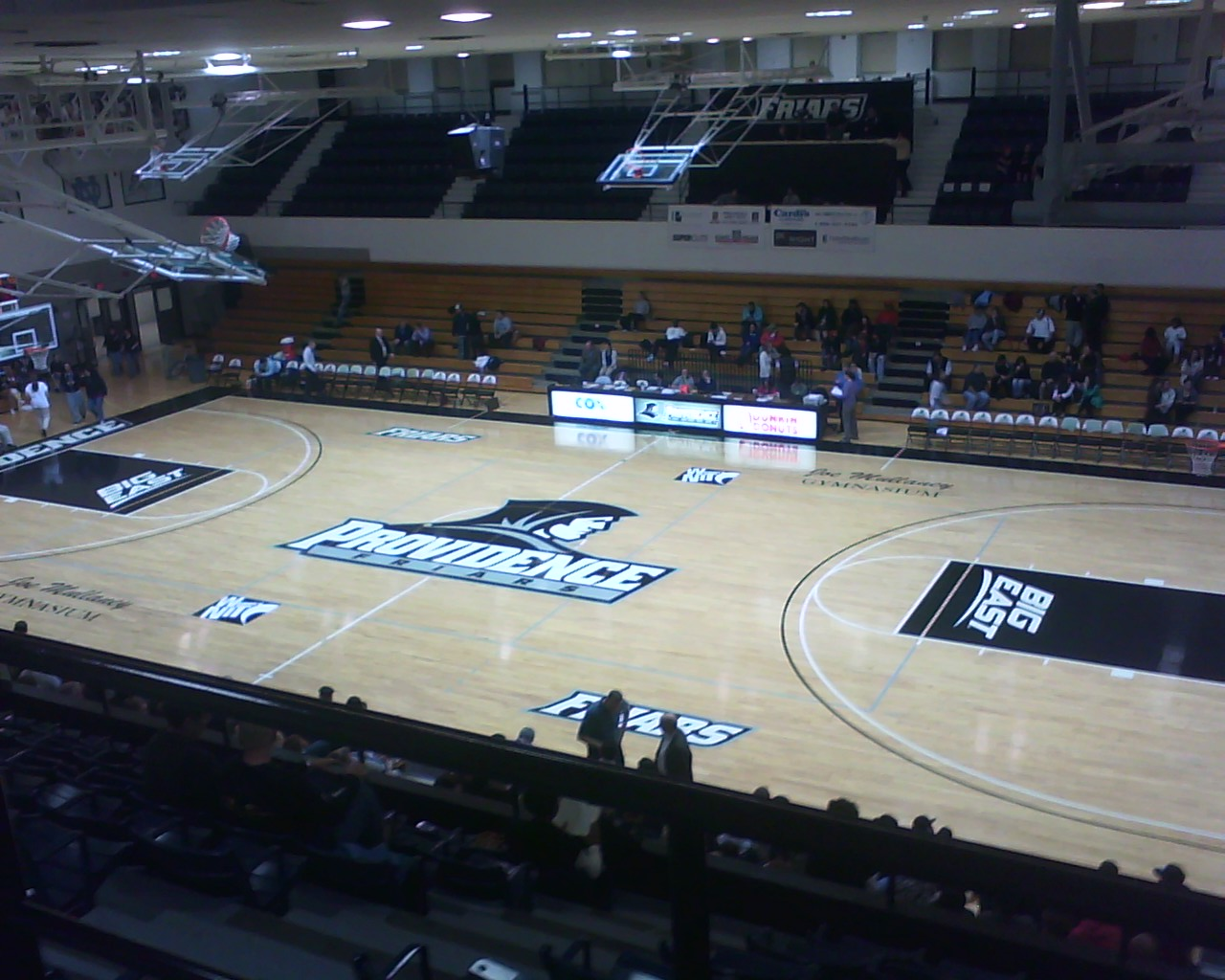
Interior of Alumni Hall

- Alumni Hall - Dedicated to alumni who served in World War II, Alumni Hall opened in 1955 and is the school's main on-campus gymnasium, seating 2,620. It is home to the athletic department and Hall of Fame, as well as the Friars women's basketball and volleyball teams. There is a large cafeteria in the basement, accessible from the Slavin Center lower level. In the early 1950s Father Robert J. Slavin felt in order for Providence College to be competitive in Men's Basketball, P.C. needed an on-campus basketball facility. Out of this belief came Alumni Hall, a 1.5-million dollar auditorium with a capacity of 2,620, which became the home of the Men's Basketball team. After 29 years of playing at various locations throughout Rhode Island, the Providence College Men's Basketball Team played its first game in Alumni Hall on December 3, 1955, beating rival Brown University, 77-55. The next 17 seasons saw the Friars post an impressive 179-27 (.869) record in Alumni Hall. In 1972, with the popularity of the men's program and the completion of the Providence Civic Center, the Friars played their last game in Alumni Hall in March, beating St. John's, 73-65. Alumni Hall became the practice facility for the men's team as they moved their home games to the Providence Civic Center - now known as the Dunkin' Donuts Center. Two years later, in 1974, Alumni Hall opened its doors to a new team - Providence College Women's Basketball. The facility remains the home court for the Women’s Basketball and Women’s Volleyball programs. In addition to being the home of the Friars, Alumni Hall has hosted many tournaments, including the opening rounds of the National Invitational Tournament (NIT) and the NCAA women's basketball tournament. In March, 1993, Providence hosted the 11th BIG EAST Women's Basketball Championship. It was the second time in conference history that the Tournament was held at Alumni Hall. PC was host of the inaugural championship in 1983. During the 2010 season, the Friars hosted two WNIT games at Alumni Hall; vs. Old Dominion (2nd Round) and vs. Miami (Quarterfinals). In the spring of 2012, the College began a $3 million overhaul of the storied facility, which includes seats backs, new lighting, air conditioning, video scoreboard and control room, media workspace, sound system and a host of other amenities. The renovation project was completed in October 2012. In 2017, LED lighting was installed in the facility.
- Concannon Fitness Center - Opened in the fall of 2007, the $15 million fitness center is over 14,000 square feet (1,300 m^{2}). It also contains a new lobby containing a unified entrance to the three main campus hubs: Slavin Center, Peterson Recreation Center, and Alumni Hall. It is named in honor of benefactor William F. Concannon, '77.
- Peterson Recreation Center - Includes a field house with an indoor track, indoor basketball courts, indoor tennis courts, racquetball courts, and the school's swimming pool, Taylor Natatorium. The Center is named for the Very Rev. Thomas R. Peterson, O.P., College President when the Center opened in 1981.
- Schneider Arena - Schneider Arena was dedicated and is named in memory of the late Reverend Herman D. Schneider, O.P., the founder of the Friars' highly successful hockey program and a long-time member of the school's faculty. For the Men's Ice Hockey program, since its opening night win, a 1-0 decision over the University of Pennsylvania on September 24, 1973, Schneider Arena has been the home of 428 Friar victories and a .608 winning percentage. At tournament time, either ECAC, Hockey East or NCAA, Providence has an impressive 30-13 mark in Schneider. The Friars' complete 44-year record stands at 428-249-61. Built at a cost of $1.8 million dollars in 1973, Schneider Arena also serves as the home of PC's Women's Ice Hockey team and also houses the Men's Lacrosse team. Schneider Arena recently underwent a massive renovation project that culminated in a Grand Reopening on Sept 27, 2013. The eight-month renovation project turned Schneider into one of finest on-campus facilities in the country. The Grand Reopening celebration included a ribbon cutting ceremony and a blessing of the building, featuring President Rev. Brian J. Shanley, O.P. '80, Athletics Director Bob Driscoll and distinguished guests. The renovation project was completed in just under eight months and included a 30,000 square-foot addition. Highlights of the addition and renovation include a new atrium, ticket office, concession stands, coaches offices, shooting room, locker rooms, meeting rooms, athletic training room, press box, five luxury suites, dasher boards, glass, video boards, video ribbon boards, scoreboards, a renovated Friends of Friar Room and a strength and conditioning facility. Schneider Arena is one of Providence College's buildings that is in constant use. It serves the needs of the Men's and Women's Ice Hockey programs as well as the Men's Lacrosse program. The Providence College club hockey team and intramurals also play at the arena. The building also serves as the home of many of Rhode Island's youth and high school hockey teams as well as junior hockey programs.
- Jimmy Walker Strength & Conditioning Center - Named after Friar basketball legend Jimmy Walker. Located in The Concannon Fitness Center, the varsity strength & conditioning facility is a 3,600 square foot area dedicated to the Friars' 19 intercollegiate athletic teams. The facility houses over 10 tons of free weights, including dumb bells ranging from five to 150 pounds and a full set of kettle bells. All hand weights, iron plates and bumper plate sets are engraved with one of the College's athletic logos. There are six Power Racks, each with an Olympic Weight-lifting platform. These training stations are extremely versatile and allow numerous athletes to perform a variety of exercises simultaneously. The facility also houses 'tools' such as stability balls, medicine balls, resistance bands, weighted vests, weighted jump ropes, plyometric jump boxes, dot drill mats, slide boards, lateral slant boards, lateral skaters, agility ladders, hurdles and numerous apparatuses to develop trunk strength and core stabilization. There also are two Woodway high performance treadmills that max out at 16.5 miles per hour.
- Taylor Natatorium - Located in the Peterson Recreation Center adjacent to Jimmy Walker Strength & Conditioning Center. "The Nat," as it is known on campus, is home to the Providence College Men's and Women's Swimming & Diving programs. The vast majority of Providence's 19 varsity athletic programs also use the facility for strength & conditioning workouts. The venue has a six-lane, 25-meter pool with a 1-meter diving board. The pool's depth ranges from 4 feet to 12 feet. Amenities inside the facility include a Coaches Suite, Varsity Team Room, Varsity Locker Rooms, general locker rooms, hot tub, CTS digital scoreboard, fold-away spectator bleachers, and flat screen TV's located near the diving board and starting blocks with instant replay capability. The venue was completely renovated during the summer of 2013 with new pool tiles, deck tiles, wedge starting blocks, seating, lighting, air flow, and Friars branding, among other improvements.
- Chapey Field at Anderson Stadium - the 2,500-seat stadium is home to the men's and women's soccer teams and the men's lacrosse team. The field is named after Mike Chapey for his donation of $1mil dollars, and stadium is named after Karl Anderson for his donation of $1.5mil It directly borders Schneider Arena and Huxley Avenue.
- Ray Tracey Track & Field Complex - the complex is the home of the schools national champion Track & Field and Cross Country teams. It is named after Ray Tracey, the school's Cross Country and Track & Field coach, who trained many national champions and olympians. The complex is on the previous site of Hendricken Field .
- Providence College Practice Basketball Facility - ... this will be the home of the Providence College men's basketball program and is set to open in 2018

In addition, the school has numerous outdoor facilities, including:

- Glay Field - the softball field, at the corner of Huxley and Eaton, on the Lower Campus. (formerly the soccer field prior to its move to Anderson Stadium in the Spring of 2016)
- Lennon Family Field - Built as part of the Concannon Center expansion, the turf field is located on the roof of a parking garage and is home to the Friar Field Hockey team.
- Tennis Courts - Situated atop a two-level parking garage adjacent to Chapey Field at Anderson Stadium, the Providence College Tennis facility consists of six courts with custom-branded umpire chairs and player benches. The facility also provides spectator seating for 200 fans. The playing surface was completely renovated and resurfaced during the 2018-19 school year.

The golf team practices at local courses, the sailing team practices at the Rhode Island Yacht Club and the Ultimate Disc team rotates their practice locations.

== Other buildings and facilities ==
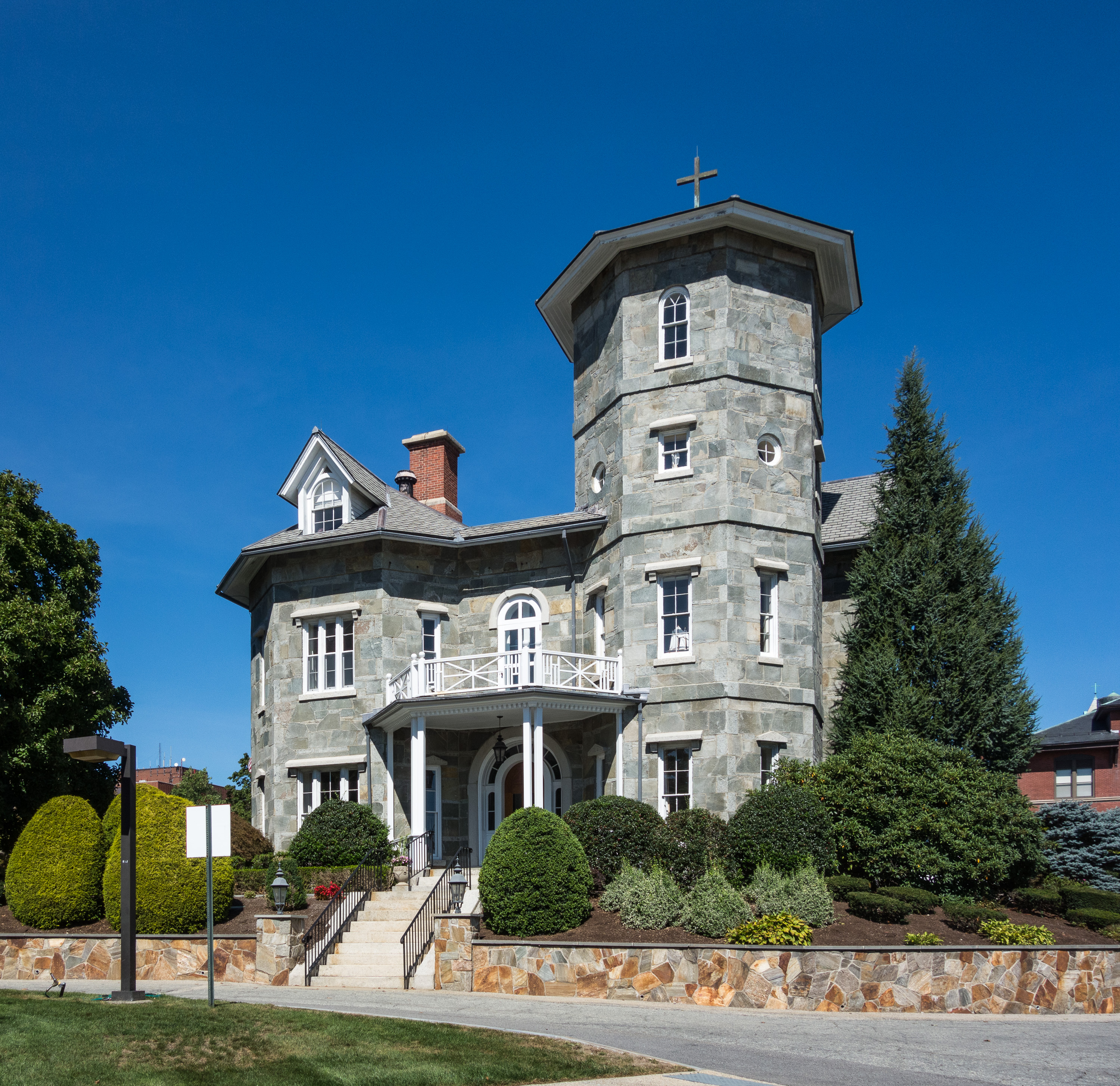
Dominic Hall

- Dominic Hall - Dominic Hall, built circa 1850, was a part of the Good Shepherd property, like its neighbors, Saint Joseph's Hall and the Feinstein Academic Center. Since Father Smith became College President in 1994, it has been the home for the President of Providence College. It had previously been the Vice-President's house, but Father Smith decided to keep it his house upon promotion to President.
- Saint Thomas Aquinas Priory / Gragnani Dominican Center - Opened in 1984, the Priory is the modern home to most of the college's Dominican clergy. Located across the main drive from Harkins Hall and Albertus Magnus Hall, it was named for Saint Thomas Aquinas and Frank ('40) and Charlotte Gragnani, major benefactors of the college.
- Dominican Community Cemetery - Located just north of McVinney Hall, the cemetery is the final resting place of many of the school's former teachers and presidents.

Additionally, there is a Power Plant located on upper campus (next to the Peterson Recreation Center), a Physical Plant located on the Lower Campus (in the far northeastern corner, behind Hunt-Cavanaugh Hall and the Ceramics Building), and the Security Office, located next to the Huxley Gate. Prior to the completion of the Concannon Center and the Friar Field Hockey & Lacrosse Complex and its corresponding parking lot redesign, a small white house, known as the Thomas House, was located next to the cemetery, near where the intersection of Annie Street and Wardlaw Avenue would have been. This house was long used as the host building for the commencement speaker.

Another house, the Antoninus House, is located across Eaton Street from Cunningham Hall. It is owned by the college and used for alumni events and other purposes.
