= Deputy governor of Oyo State =

Second highest-ranking official in the executive branch of Oyo State in Nigeria

Deputy Governor of Oyo State
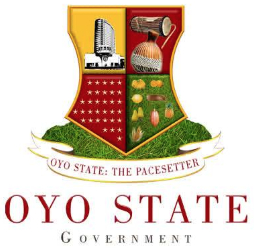
- Seal of Oyo State

- Flag of Oyo State
- Incumbent; Bayo Lawal since 18 July 2022
- Executive Branch of the Oyo State Government
- Style: Deputy Governor (informal); His Excellency (courtesy)
- Status: Second highest executive branch officer
- Member of: Oyo State Executive Branch; Oyo State Cabinet
- Seat: Ibadan
- Nominator: Gubernatorial candidate
- Appointer: Direct popular election or, if vacant, Governor via House of Assembly confirmation
- Term length: Four years renewable once
- Constituting instrument: Constitution of Nigeria
- Inaugural holder: Iyiola Oladokun (Fourth Republic)
- Succession: First
- Website: oyostate.gov.ng

The deputy governor of Oyo State is the second-highest officer in the executive branch of the government of Oyo State, Nigeria, after the governor of Oyo State, and ranks first in line of succession. The deputy governor is directly elected together with the governor to a four-year term of office.

Bayo Lawal is the current deputy governor, having assumed office on 18 July 2022, following the impeachment of his predecessor, Rauf Olaniyan.

== Qualifications ==
As in the case of the Governor, in order to be qualified to be elected as deputy governor, a person must:

- be at least thirty-five (35) years of age;
- be a Nigerian citizen by birth;
- be a member of a political party with endorsement by that political party;
- have School Certificate or its equivalent.

== Responsibilities ==
The deputy governor assists the governor in exercising primary assignments and is also eligible to replace a dead, impeached, absent or ill Governor as required by the 1999 Constitution of Nigeria.

== List of deputy governors ==
Name	Took office	Left office	Time in office	Party	Elected	Governor
Sunday Afolabi (1931–2004)	1 October 1979	1982	2–3 years	Unity Party of Nigeria	1979	Bola Ige
Adebisi Akande (born 1939)	1982	1 October 1983	0–1 year	Unity Party of Nigeria		Bola Ige
Olatunji Mohammed (1938–2000)	1 October 1983	31 December 1983	91 days	National Party of Nigeria	1983	Victor Omololu Olunloyo
Ahmed Gbadamosi	2 January 1992	17 November 1993	1 year, 319 days	Social Democratic Party	1991	Kolapo Ishola
Iyiola Oladokun	29 May 1999	29 May 2003	4 years	Alliance for Democracy	1999	Lam Adesina
Adebayo Alao-Akala (1950–2022)	29 May 2003	12 January 2006	2 years, 228 days	Peoples Democratic Party	2003	Rashidi Ladoja
Hazeem Gbolarumi (born 1957)	23 January 2006	7 December 2006	318 days	Peoples Democratic Party		Adebayo Alao-Akala
Adebayo Alao-Akala (1950–2022)	7 December 2006	29 May 2007	173 days	Peoples Democratic Party		Rashidi Ladoja
Taofeek Arapaja (born 1958)	29 May 2007	29 May 2011	4 years	Peoples Democratic Party	2007	Adebayo Alao-Akala
Moses Alake Adeyemo (born 1950)	29 May 2011	29 May 2019	8 years	All Progressives Congress	2011; 2015	Abiola Ajimobi
Rauf Olaniyan (born 1960)	29 May 2019	18 July 2022	3 years, 50 days	Peoples Democratic Party	2019	Seyi Makinde
Bayo Lawal (born 1954)	18 July 2022	Incumbent	4 years, 51 days	Peoples Democratic Party	2023	Seyi Makinde

== See also ==
- List of governors of Oyo State
