= Alao (name) =

Alao is a surname, middle name, and given name. It may refer to:

- Bose Alao
- Ibiyinka Alao
- Jaiyegbade Alao
- Ayodeji Olamijuwonlo Alao
- Abiodun Alao
- Halima Tayo Alao
- Abimbola Alao
- Zaka Alao
- Shittu Alao
- Nurudeen Oladapo Alao
- Samuel Ekundayo Alao

== As a middle name ==
- Olamijuwonlo Alao Akala
- Rashid Olatokunbo Oladobe Alao Yussuff

== As a given name ==
- Alao Fatai Adisa
