= 2003 Oyo State gubernatorial election =

2003 gubernatorial election in Oyo State, Nigeria

- (Nigeria)
- April 19, 2003
Nominee	Rashidi Ladoja	Lam Adesina
Party	PDP	AD
Running mate	Adebayo Alao-Akala
Popular vote	636,212	381,310
Governor before election
Lam Adesina
AD
Elected Governor
Rashidi Ladoja
PDP

The 2003 Oyo State gubernatorial election occurred on April 19, 2003. PDP's Rashidi Ladoja won election for a first tenure, defeating Incumbent Governor, AD's Lam Adesina and three other candidates.

Rashidi Ladoja emerged winner in the PDP gubernatorial primary election. His running mate was Adebayo Alao-Akala.

== Electoral system ==
The Governor of Oyo State is elected using the plurality voting system.

== Results ==
A total of five candidates registered with the Independent National Electoral Commission to contest in the election. PDP candidate Rashidi Ladoja won election for a first tenure, defeating AD Incumbent Governor, Lam Adesina, and three other candidates.

The total number of registered voters in the state was 2,209,953. However, only 51.4% (i.e. 1,130,142) of registered voters participated in the excerise.

Candidate	Party	Votes	%
Rashidi Ladoja	People's Democratic Party (PDP)	636,212	62.53
Lam Adesina	Alliance for Democracy (AD)	381,310	37.47
C. O. Obisesan	All Nigeria Peoples Party(ANPP)		
United Nigeria People's Party (UNPP)			
Femi Aborishade	National Conscience Party (NCP)		
Total		1,017,522	100.00
Registered voters/turnout		2,209,953	–
Source: Gamji, Africa Update, Dawodu
