= 1983 Oyo State gubernatorial election =

1983 gubernatorial election in Oyo State, Nigeria

- August 13, 1983
Nominee	Victor Omololu Olunloyo	Bola Ige
Party	NPN	UPN
Running mate	Olatunji Mohammed
Popular vote	1,603,267	1,095,877
Governor before election
Bola Ige
UPN
Elected Governor
Victor Omololu Olunloyo
NPN

The 1983 Oyo State gubernatorial election occurred on August 13, 1983. NPN's Victor Omololu Olunloyo won election for a first term, defeating main opposition UPN candidate, Bola Ige, and other party candidates in the contest.

Victor Omololu Olunloyo emerged winner in the NPN gubernatorial primary election. His running mate was Olatunji Mohammed.

== Electoral system ==
The Governor of Oyo State is elected using the plurality voting system.

== Results ==
There were five parties registered by the Federal Electoral Commission (FEDECO). The NPN candidate, Victor Omololu Olunloyo, was announced by the returning officer, Daniel Adopoju Lapade Laniran, to have defeated the Incumbent Governor, UPN's Bola Ige to win the contest. There was a total of 3,004,715 vote cast.

Candidate	Party	Votes	%
Victor Omololu Olunloyo	National Party of Nigeria (NPN)	1,603,267	59.40
Bola Ige	Unity Party of Nigeria (UPN)	1,095,877	40.60
Great Nigeria People's Party GNPP)			
People's Redemption Party (PRP)			
Nigeria Advance Party (NAP)			
Total		2,699,144	100.00
Source: Lawyer Online
