= Olunloyo =

Olúnlọ́yọ́
- Gender: Male
- Language: Yoruba

Origin
- Origin: Nigerian
- Meaning: He is a lord at Ọ̀yọ́.
- Region of origin: South West, Nigeria

Olúnlọ́yọ́ audio is a Nigerian surname. It is a male name and of Yoruba origin, which means "He is a lord at Ọ̀yọ́.". The name Olúnlọ́yọ́ is common among the Oyo people of the Southwest, Nigeria.

== Notable individuals with the name ==
- Folake Olunloyo, Nigerian politician
- Kemi Omololu-Olunloyo (born 1964), Nigerian journalist, blogger, and activist
- Victor Omololu Olunloyo (1935–2025), Nigerian mathematician
