= 1999 Oyo State gubernatorial election =

1999 gubernatorial election in Oyo State, Nigeria

- January 9, 1999
Nominee	Lam Adesina
Party	AD	PDP
Popular vote	454,680	219,200
Governor before election
Kolapo Ishola
SDP
Elected Governor
Lam Adesina
AD

The 1999 Oyo State gubernatorial election occurred in Nigeria on January 9, 1999. The AD nominee Lam Adesina won the election, defeating the PDP candidate.

Lam Adesina emerged AD candidate.

== Electoral system ==
The Governor of Oyo State is elected using the plurality voting system.

== Primary election ==
=== AD primary ===
The AD primary election was won by Lam Adesina.

== Results ==
The total number of registered voters in the state was 2,397,270. Total number of votes cast was 714,312, while number of valid votes was 693,349. Rejected votes were 20,963.

Candidate	Party	Votes	%
Lam Adesina	AD	454,680	67.47
People's Democratic Party	219,200	32.53	
Total		673,880	100.00
Valid votes		673,880	96.98
Invalid/blank votes		20,963	3.02
Total votes		694,843	100.00
Registered voters/turnout		2,397,270	28.98
Source: Nigeria World, IFES, Semantics Scholar
