= Abdulmojeed Mogbonjubola =

Nigerian architect and politician

Commissioner for Public Works, Infrastructure, and Transport, Oyo State
- Incumbent
- Assumed office 2025
- Governor: Seyi Makinde

Commissioner for Environment and Natural Resources, Oyo State
- In office 2023–2025
- Governor: Seyi Makinde

Deputy Chief of Staff to the Governor of Oyo State
- In office 2019–2023
- Governor: Seyi Makinde

Personal details
- Born: Oyo State, Nigeria
- Party: Peoples Democratic Party
- Education: Obafemi Awolowo University
- Occupation: Architect, businessperson, politician

Abdulmojeed Mogbonjubola is a Nigerian architect, businessperson, and politician who has served as Commissioner for Public Works, Infrastructure, and Transport in Oyo State since 2025. He previously served as Deputy Chief of Staff to the Governor of Oyo State from 2019 to 2023, and as Commissioner for Environment and Natural Resources, Oyo State from 2023 to 2025.

== Education ==
Mogbonjubola studied architecture at Obafemi Awolowo University.

== Career ==
Mogbonjubola has worked for more than a decade as an architect and is a principal partner of Cadarch Limited. Before his appointment as Deputy Chief of Staff to the Governor of Oyo State, Seyi Makinde, he was Executive Director with Trèvo LLC.

Mogbonjubola is a member of the Peoples Democratic Party in Oyo State.

In 2019, he was appointed Deputy Chief of Staff to Governor Seyi Makinde. In 2023, during Makinde’s second term, Mogbonjubola was appointed Commissioner for Environment and Natural Resources. In May 2025, he was redeployed to the Ministry of Public Works, Infrastructure, and Transport, a position he continues to hold.
