= 1991 Oyo State gubernatorial election =

1991 gubernatorial election in Oyo State, Nigeria

Oyo gubernatorial election
- December 14, 1991
Nominee	Kolapo Ishola
Party	SDP
Elected Governor
Kolapo Ishola
SDP

The 1991 Oyo State gubernatorial election occurred on December 14, 1991. SDP candidate Kolapo Ishola won the election.

== Conduct ==
The gubernatorial election was conducted using an open ballot system. Primaries for the two parties to select their flag bearers were conducted on October 19, 1991.

The election occurred on December 14, 1991. SDP candidate Kolapo Ishola won the election.
