= Ogbomosho =

Ogbomosho Ògbómọ̀ṣọ́ (Yoruba)
- City
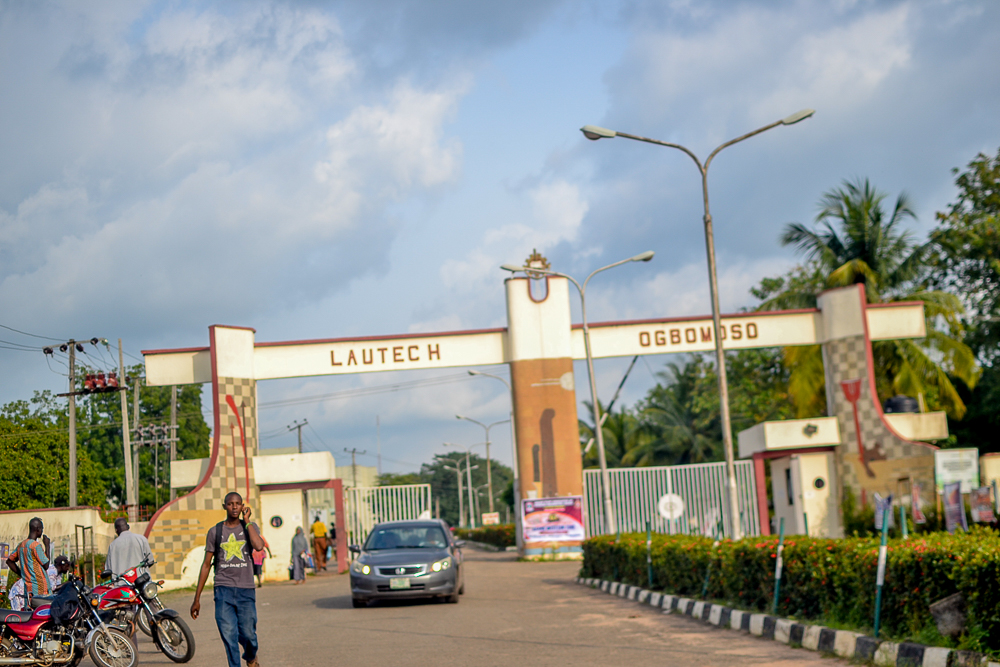
- Ladoke Akintola University of Technology
- Nickname: Mosh Town
- Ogbomosho shown within Nigeria
- Coordinates: 8°08′N 4°15′E
- Country: Nigeria
- State: Oyo State
- LGAs: North; South; Surulere; Ogo-oluwa; Oriire
- Elevation: 347 m (1,138 ft)

Population
  - Urban: 554,690 (2,006 census)
  - Urban density: 2,110/km^{2} (5,500/sq mi)
  - Metro: 2,752,000
- Time zone: UTC+1 (WAT (UTC+1))
- Climate: Aw
- National language: English
- Website: ogbomosoinsightonline.com.ng

Ogbomosho (also known as Ogbomoso and Ògbómọ̀ṣọ́) is a city in Oyo State, south-western Nigeria. It was founded in the mid 17th century. The urban population was approximately 744,835 in 2024. It is the second largest city in Oyo State and among the most populated in Nigeria. It is the 3rd most populated city in South Western Nigeria after Lagos and Ibadan. The City itself has 5 local governments(12 LCDA's), which makes it one of the largest cities in Nigeria. Although the principal inhabitants of the city are the Yoruba people, there are people from other parts of Nigeria and other West African countries who are residents in the city.

== History ==
Ọlábánjọ Ògúnlọlá Ògúndìran was of Ibariba descent. He and his wife, Esuu, built their hut by the side of the Àjàgbọn tree.

According to an early missionary, "Ògbómọ̀ṣọ́ in 1891 was a walled city, the gates of which were closely watched by day and securely closed by night. The town, picturesque and well watered was isolated from the rest of the Yoruba towns. Political relations were maintained with the Ibadans, for the country depended on its security on the warriors of Ògbómọ̀ṣọ́ and Ikirun...The strength of Ògbómọ̀ṣọ́ lay in the wall and moat surrounding the town, and the warriors made full use of it by sitting close and tight.."

The city of Ogbomoso was founded in the mid-17th century AD by Ogunlola, a skilled and courageous hunter of Ibariba origin. Historians do not know his real name, but early Yoruba settlers called him "Ogunlola" because he was a hunter and adventurer. (Historically, the important Ibariba ethnic group lived in northern Benin, especially in Borgu, an artificially divided area on the border between Benin and Niger in Nigeria today, their people are spread between Kwara State and the Borgu section of Niger State, of Sudanese origin and call themselves "Batono" meaning people, and their society is class-based and traditionally slave-owning)_ according to a brief history of Ogbomoso by J. M Adeoye.

The area that is called Ògbómọ̀ṣọ́ today is between Igbọ́n and Ìrẹṣà—Arẹṣà to the west; Oníkòyí to the East; Olúgbọ́n to the north; and Tìmì of Ẹdẹ to its south direction—according to Ògbómọ̀ṣọ́ History and Origin Documentary by Israel Ayanwuyi.

Ògúnlọlá (later Ṣọ̀ún) noticed smoke oozing from some nearby locations. He took courage and approached these places and discovered other hunters. There is no more Baálẹ̀ Akandíẹ̀.

Ogunlola, after the discovery of these hunters, took the initiative to invite them to form the Alongo Society. The primary objectives of the society were defence against Sunmoni (slave prowlers) raids, group hunting of wild animals, and mutual assistance. After each day's hunting, they retired to Ogunlola's hut where they were treated to beans and other meals and were served with Sekete wine brewed by Ogunlola's wife from fermented guinea corn. They also engaged in discussing current affairs and planning.

Esuu, the wife of Ogunlola, introduced the worship of Orisapopo to Ogbomosho. The worshippers were distinguished by white beads worn round their necks and wearing of white dresses only. Drinking of palm wine was forbidden to them. The name Orisapopo was probably derived from the fact that Ogunlola's hut was on the northsouthern route, therefore the Orisala being worshipped in the hut was named "Orisapopo" (idol by the highway). The importance and influence of 'Orisapopo' among the citizens of Ogbomoso is immense. It can be described as the patron Òrìṣà of Ògbómọ̀ṣọ́.

Devastating havoc was brought upon the Oyo people when the Ibaribas, under Elemoso's leadership attacked Oyo-Ile near Ilorin city. He consequently took total siege on Oyo, causing famine and hardship in the State.

Alaafin was so impressed by Ogunlola's prowess that he, the Alaafin, requested Ogunlola to stay in the capital (Oyo-Ile) instead of returning to his settlement. Ogunlola politely declined saying "Ejeki a ma se ohun" meaning "let me manage that place." His majesty, the Alaafin, granted Ogunlola's wish to return to his settlement. This was later contracted to Ogbomoso.

Eventually, the authority of Ogunlola became greater and more respected. His compound by the Ajagbon tree then became the Soun's palace and a rallying point for all Ogbomoso citizens.

Ogbomosho, because of her strategic location, quickly grew from a village status to a medium size town. Her people were also renown warriors. During the Fulani wars of the 19th century, many towns and villages (about 147) were deserted while their people took refuge in Ogbomosho. The influx of people further enhanced the size and strength of the town.

=== Alagba the sacred tortoise ===
Alagba is believed to have been born in the year 1675 in the old Oyo town, which is now being referred to as Ogbomoso. He was reputedly said to have been brought from the forest by the third Soun of Ogbomoso, Oba Ikumoyede who ruled from 1770 until 1797.In deference to its age, it is called Alagba, which means "the elderly one" in Yoruba. In Ogbomoso, where the legendary tortoise lumbers about in the palatial grounds of the king, it is almost a sacrilege to refer to Alagba as a mere tortoise. The tortoise played host to many monarchs in Ogbomoso in the past.

The sacred tortoise, which was believed to be the oldest in Africa, was sick for a few days before her demise on 5 October 2019.

The palace household, Ogbomoso community and stakeholders in the tourism sector are reportedly mourning Alagba's passage because of the great impact left behind. Plans are underway to preserve Alagba's body for historical records.( by Timothy copy )

== List of Monarchs ==
The founder of Ogbomoso, Soun Olabanjo Ogunlola Ogundiran, was the first Soun of Ogbomoso. He had 5 sons, Lakale, Kekere, Esuo, Eiye and Jogioro. He was later succeeded by his youngest son, Erinbaba Alamu Jogioro, who was the second Soun.

== Traditional council ==
The traditional council in Ogbomosho comprises seven esteemed leaders, with diverse perspectives represented and they are headed by the Areago.

The council include:

Areago, Jagun, Bara, Ikolaba, Abese, Balogun and Iyalode

The traditional council of Ogbomoso, known as Ilus (the citizenry), is composed of seven principal officeholders—six male and one female—who collectively represent the political, military, social, and economic interests of the community, led by the Arãago.

The council includes key offices: the Arãago (who serves as deputy to the Soun and guarantor of political continuity); The Jagan (a warrior-administrator and local authority); The Bara (a senior chief and policy shaper); The Ikolaba (a ministerial officer overseeing internal governance); The Abese (a trusted advisor on strategic and external affairs); The Balogun (the commander of the town’s armies and symbol of protection); And The Iyalode (the highest-ranking female leader and institutional representative of women’s interests).

== Education ==
Ogbomosho has four degree-awarding institutions of higher learning. Ladoke Akintola University of Technology (LAUTECH) is named for the Ogbomosho son and Premier of the old Western Nigeria, Samuel Ladoke Akintola (SLA). LAUTECH is ranked at the top of the later generation universities in Nigeria. It awards degrees in science, engineering, technology and medicine.This university has a teaching hospital named Lautech Teaching Hospital.

The Nigerian Baptist Theological Seminary (NBTS), one of the oldest institutions of higher learning in Nigeria and the first to award degrees offering programs in theology, sociology and philosophy in Nigeria. The Seminary serves the Baptist Church in Nigeria, The Nigerian Baptist Convention (NBC), which also has its headquarters in Ibadan, Oyo State.

Bowen University Teaching Hospital Ogbomoso- (BUTH) A Christian Teaching hospital training doctors and other medical professionals. Originally established in March 1907 as a missionary medical facility and through the years developing into the Baptist Medical Centre and later transformed to a Teaching Hospital in 2009. BUTH now boasts of over 400 Bed Capacity, over 800 Staff and Students, Multidisciplinary Facility, Family Medicine Residency Programme, Nursing and Midwifery Courses, 50,000 Outpatients and 10,000 Inpatients, fully Accredited Training Programmes which includes; B.Sc. Anatomy, B.Sc. Physiology and MB/BS.

The Federal Government of Nigeria recently approved the establishment of Federal Polytechnic, Ayede, a satellite town of Ogbomosho. Learning and research activities will soon commence in this institution.

Recently, the federal government also approved the establishment of one of the four campuses of the National Academy for Cultural Studies (NACUS) in Ogbomosho. Plans are in advanced stages for the establishment of a community owned, multi-campus, private university. The headquarters of the renowned SQI College of ICT are located in the city. Other higher institutions in the city are Best Legacy College of Education, Bethsaida College of Health Technology, and Covenant College of Health Technology.

The federal government-owned Federal Government College, Ogbomosho and Nigerian Navy Secondary School, Ogbomosho are located in the city. There are numerous private secondary schools all over the city, some of which are Pine Valley High School, Gomal Baptist College (GBCO), Victory Model College, Faith Academy, VISTO Group of Schools, Smith International Baptist Academy, George Green Baptist College, Zoe Schools, Maryland Catholic High School, Anglican Model College, Lautech International College, Royal International College, Zion Christian Academy, and Command Secondary School, Gambari.

== Economy ==
Ogbomosho has about 257 surrounding villages and emerging towns which amalgamated to the rulership of Soun. The major economy in the land is Agriculture: Cashew plantations are widely distributed across the land, In addition, Mango plantations are widely distributed too. Ogbomosho is one time the largest planter of cassava across the globe. The people of the land also engage in trading, and rearing of domestic animals like goats and sheep. Also, a very prominent veterinary hospital exists in Ogbomosho for the vaccination of livestock. The people are widely traveled.

Other industries include trading, banking, small-scale manufacturing, and construction. There are five radio stations namely Brave FM, Parrot FM, Lautech Radio, Ogoilu FM, and Ajilete FM, and a television station, NTA Ogbomosho.

Inadequate government investment in infrastructural facilities and policy guidance for local initiatives have undermined the economic growth and development of the town. The location of the town on terrain unattractive to manufacturers and investors, with the road network being poor.

== Cityscape ==
Ogbomosho is connected by roads from cities such as Ilorin, Osogbo, and Ibadan. One of the prominent landmarks is the central mosque at Oja-Igbo, which towers over the traditional walled compounds of private houses and the parts of the old wall that remain. Okelerin Baptist church also serve as one of the oldest churches and building in the town. Other prominent landmarks are Ogbomosho Recreation Club, Ladoke Akintola University of Technology,Lautech's College of Health Sciences,Nigerian Baptist Theological Seminary, Bowen University Teaching HospitalLautech Teaching Hospital, Heroes Arcade and Soun Stadium.

Ogbomosho has other mosques, several churches, estates, and business complexes littered all over the city. Ogbomosho Recreation Club has meeting halls, an indoor sports hall and a golf course. The headquarters of the American Baptist Church of Nigeria and its theological seminary are located in the city. The closest airport to Ogbomosho is Ilorin Airport which is approximately 52 kilometers away.

== Climate ==
Precipitation is most common from May to October. It is more cloudy during the wet season (May to October).

== Religion ==
The three main faiths in Ogbomoso are Christianity, Islam, and traditional African religions.

== Notable people ==
- Chief Samuel Ladoke Akintola, a lawyer, politician, aristocrat,and former Premier of the old western region. He was murdered during the Nigeria first coup of January 1966.
- Maj. Gen. Oladayo Popoola OFR. Former Military Governor, Oyo State . Former Military Governor, Ogun State . Chairman/CPO, Daybis Ltd.
- Christopher Adebayo Alao-Akala, Former executive governor of Oyo State.
- Col. Ibrahim Taiwo, former military governor of Kwara State
- Dayo Okeniyi, Hollywood Actor
- Alexander Abolore, Nigerian Artiste
- Lt. Col. Shittu Alao, former Air Force's Chief of the Air Staff.
- Oyeronke Oyewumi, esteemed theorist in African Gender Studies
- Ayankola Ayanwuyi nigerian documentary filmmaker and author
- Lekan KingKong, Nigerian content creator and entrepreneur

== Bibliography ==
- Pinnock, Samuel George (1917). The romance of missions in Nigeria. Richmond, Va.: Educational department, Foreign mission board, Southern Baptist convention. (index, Ogbomosho: pp. 174-175)
