= Emmanuel Ayankanmi Ayandele =

Emmanuel Ayankanmi Ayandele (born 12 October 1935), was a Nigerian historian, academic administrator, and scholar known for his contributions to African historiography and the study of colonial and missionary influence in Nigeria. He was widely recognized for his work on Nigerian history, nationalism, education, and elite society. Ayandele served in major academic leadership positions, including at the University of Ibadan and the University of Calabar.

== Early life and education ==
E. A. Ayandele was born in October 1935 in Ogbomosho, Oyo State, Nigeria. He attended Baptist Boys High School in Oyo between 1948 and 1953. He later studied at the Nigerian College of Arts, Science, and Technology, Ibadan, from 1954 to 1956 before he proceeded to the University of London from 1961 to 1963.

== Academic career ==
Ayandele started his academic career as a lecturer in history at the University of Ibadan in the early 1960s. He later became a senior Lecturer and subsequently a professor of history. His scholarship focused on the political, social, and cultural transformations of Nigeria during the colonial and post-colonial eras. Also he held several administrative positions in Nigerian higher education, Ayandele served as acting Principal and later Principal of the Jos Campus of the University of Ibadan, which later became the University of Jos. He subsequently became acting Vice-Chancellor and later Vice-Chancellor of the University of Calabar.
