= Olusegun Muniru Olagunju =

Nigerian jurist

Hon. Justice Olusegun Muniru Olagunju

Judge of the High Court of Oyo State
- Incumbent
- Assumed office 4 January 2006
- Appointed by: Rashidi Ladoja

Personal details
- Born: September 11, 1958 (age 67) Ibadan, Oyo State, Nigeria
- Education: University of Lagos (LL.B)
- Occupation: Jurist

Olusegun Muniru Olagunju (born 11 September 1958) is a Nigerian jurist who has served on the bench of the High Court of Oyo State since 2006. He currently sits in the Ibadan Judicial Division.

== Early life and education ==
Olagunju was born on 11 September 1958 in Ibadan, Oyo State. He attended Fatima College, Ikire, for his secondary education and later studied at the College of Arts and Science, Ile‑Ife, where he completed his A‑Levels.

He proceeded to the University of Lagos, graduating with a Bachelor of Laws (LL.B) degree in 1983. He then attended the Nigerian Law School and was called to the Bar in 1984.

== Career ==
=== Legal career ===
Olagunju began his professional practice as a junior counsel in the chambers of Chief Agbo Olaleye, where he worked until 1986. He later joined Chief M.L. Lagunju Chambers, serving there between 1986 and 1988.

In 1988, he established his own law firm, Segun Lagunju & Co., where he was Principal Counsel until his appointment to the judiciary in 2006.

=== Judicial career ===
On 4 January 2006, Olagunju was sworn in as a Judge of the High Court of Oyo State by Governor Rashidi Ladoja.
