= Oladayo =

Oladayo is both a given name and a surname. Notable people with the name include:

- Oladayo Popoola (born 1944), Nigerian major-general
- Isiaka Oladayo Amao (born 1965), Nigerian air marshal
