= Ayodeji Olamijuwonlo Alao =

Nigerian politician (born 1984)

Representative
- In office 2023–2027
- Constituency: Ogbomoso North, South, and Oriire Federal Constituency

Ayodeji Olamijuwonlo Alao (born September 9, 1984) is a Nigerian politician and a current member of the House of Representatives in the 10th National Assembly, representing the Ogbomoso North, South, and Orire Federal Constituency since June 2023. He is a member of the All Progressives Congress (APC).

== Early life and education ==
Olamijuwonlo was born into the family of Christopher Adebayo Alao-Akala, a former governor of Oyo State on September 9, 1984, in Lagos State, Nigeria.

== Career ==
Olamijuwonlo has embarked on various professional endeavors before venturing into politics. Early in his career, Olamijuwonlo started off as the Chief Executive Officer at TDB Global Venture, he also served as the Chairman of Parrot FM Radio Station.

Olamijuwonlo's entry into politics was marked by his election as the Executive Chairman of Ogbomoso North Local Government in Oyo State in 2018. However, his term was interrupted by a suspension in 2019 over allegations of anti-party activities.

In the 2023 general elections won a seat in the green chamber to represent Ogbomoso North, South, and Oriire Federal Constituency under the umbrella of the All Progressive Congress (APC). He serves as the Chairman of the House Committee on Youth in Parliament.
