= 1979 Oyo State gubernatorial election =

1979 gubernatorial election in Oyo State, Nigeria

- July 28, 1979
Nominee	Bola Ige
Party	UPN
Elected Governor
Bola Ige
UPN

The 1979 Oyo State gubernatorial election occurred on July 28, 1979. UPN candidate Bola Ige won the election.

== Results ==
Bola Ige representing UPN won the election. The election held on July 28, 1979.
