= 1992 Nigerian Senate elections in Oyo State =

1992 Nigerian Senate election in Oyo State

The 1992 Nigerian Senate election in Oyo State was held on July 4, 1992, to elect members of the Nigerian Senate to represent Oyo State. Ayantayo Ayandele representing Oyo North, Rasheed Ladoja representing Oyo South and Wande Abimbola representing Oyo Central all won on the platform of the Social Democratic Party.

== Overview ==
Affiliation	Party		Total
Affiliation	SDP	NRC	Total
Before Election			3
After Election	3	0	3

== Summary ==
District	Incumbent	Party	Elected Senator	Party
Oyo North			Ayantayo Ayandele	SDP
Oyo South			Rasheed Ladoja	SDP
Oyo Central			Wande Abimbola	SDP

== Results ==
=== Oyo North ===
The election was won by Ayantayo Ayandele of the Social Democratic Party.

1992 Nigerian Senate election in Oyo State
Party	Candidate	Votes	%
SDP	Ayantayo Ayandele		
Total votes			
SDP hold			

=== Oyo South ===
The election was won by Rasheed Ladoja of the Social Democratic Party.

1992 Nigerian Senate election in Oyo State
Party	Candidate	Votes	%
SDP	Rasheed Ladoja		
Total votes			
SDP hold			

=== Oyo Central ===
The election was won by Wande Abimbola of the Social Democratic Party.

1992 Nigerian Senate election in Oyo State
Party	Candidate	Votes	%
SDP	Wande Abimbola		
Total votes			
SDP hold			
