= Abdulkareem Adisa =

Nigerian military officer (1948–2005)

Major General Abdulkareem Adisa

Military Governor of Oyo State
- In office August 1990 – January 1992
- Preceded by: Colonel Sasaenia Oresanya
- Succeeded by: Chief Kolapo Olawuyi Ishola

Personal details
- Born: 22 August 1948
- Died: 25 February 2005 (aged 56)

Military service
- Allegiance: Nigeria
- Branch/service: Nigerian Army
- Years of service: 1970 – 1997
- Rank: Major General

Abdulkareem Adisa (Yoruba pronunciation; August 22, 1948 – February 25, 2005) was a Nigerian major general who was military governor of Oyo State (August 1990 – January 1992) during the military regime of General Ibrahim Babangida. He was convicted for involvement in an attempted coup against military head of state General Sani Abacha in 1997, and was on death row when Abacha died in June 1998. He was subsequently pardoned.

== Early years and education ==
Abdulkareem Adisa was born in Ilorin, now in Kwara State.

He attended Quranic School in Ilorin between 1951-1953 and received his elementary education at Catholic Primary School, Ibuso Gboro Ibadan from 1953 to 1958. He got his secondary education at Nigerian Military School, Zaria from 1962 to 1965, and started his time in the Nigerian Army as an officer cadet in 1967 with the Nigerian Defence Academy, Kaduna where he graduated from in 1970.

== Military career ==
As a Lieutenant during the Nigerian Civil War, he was captured by Biafran forces in August 1967, and was detained until January 1970.

Abdulkareem Adisa was appointed military governor of Oyo State in August 1990 by the military president, General Ibrahim Babangida, holding office until January 1992. He was a 'no nonsense' governor and was well respected generally by the citizens.

While governor of Oyo State, Adisa erected a statue of the unknown soldier in front of government house, Ibadan. This statue was destroyed and replaced with a statue of Obafemi Awolowo by Governor Lam Adesina. The second statue was pulled down a few days after Governor Adeshina left office.

== Minister of Works and Housing ==
General Sani Abacha, who became head of state in November 1993, appointed him Minister of Works and Housing. He investigated the conduct of his predecessor at the ministry, Lateef Jakande, and absolved him of any wrongdoing. He continued the National Housing Policy initiated by Lateef Jakande, which planned to build affordable units across Nigeria, but more than doubled the price of each type of house. During his term of office, deposits for the houses were used to award contracts for infrastructure to the sites. As a result, many years later a considerable number of depositors had not got houses or refunds of their deposits.

Adisa directed that the Federal School of Surveying should channel the evolution from analogue to digital methods.

== Coup attempt and trial ==
In December 1997, Abdulkareem Adisa was arrested on charges of participating in a coup attempt against General Sani Abacha, along with Lt-General Oladipo Diya, Major-General Tajudeen Olanrewaju and others. He was tried and found guilty on 28 April 1998. In June 1998, he was on death row when Abacha died suddenly. In March 1999, Nigeria's outgoing military government granted state pardons to Adisa and the others convicted of the coup attempt.

He appeared before The Human Rights Violation Investigation Commission of Nigeria (also known as Oputa Panel) confirming that he heard of the four point agenda, just nine days before his arrest for participating in a coup, from Gen Oladipo Diya and was informed about the coup by nobody else apart from him. He also confessed that he begged for mercy to save his life from Major Hamza al-Mustapha.

== Later career ==
After the return to democracy in 1999, Adisa ventured into publishing with a paper The People's Advocate based in Ilorin. The paper was the target of a N250 million libel action from the Kwara State Governor, Mohammed Lawal, which was later withdrawn.

In 2003, Adisa said he would not accept a pardon from President Olusegun Obasanjo, who had himself participated in a coup attempt in 1995. In April 2004, he was active in the People's Democratic Party (PDP) in Kwara State. One PDP group suspended the Minister of State for Women Affairs, Miss Funke Adedoyin, but another group of PDP elders, led by Adisa, voided Adedoyin's suspension. Adisa also became vice-chairman of the Kwara Progressive Movement (KPM).

Adisa was leader of a movement to elect General Ibrahim Babangida as president in 2007. He published an attack on the National Democratic Coalition (NADECO) in The Guardian of 28 April 2004, warning the group not to try to prevent the Babangida's presidential election. He said the Yoruba would vote for Ibrahim Babangida despite his role in annulling the June 12, 1993 presidential election won by the Chief MKO Abiola.

Adisa died in a London hospital on February 25, 2005 from injuries sustained in a car accident. His body was returned for burial in Ilorin, the Kwara State capital on 27 February 2005, in a ceremony attended by many prominent people including three former state governors and General Ibrahim Babangida. On 23 June 2009, President Umaru Yar'Adua granted a presidential pardon posthumously to Abdulkareem Adisa and others convicted of treason for the Sani Abacha coup attempts.
