= Olamijuwonlo Alao Akala =

Nigerian politician and philanthropist

Honourable Olamijuwonlo Alao Akala
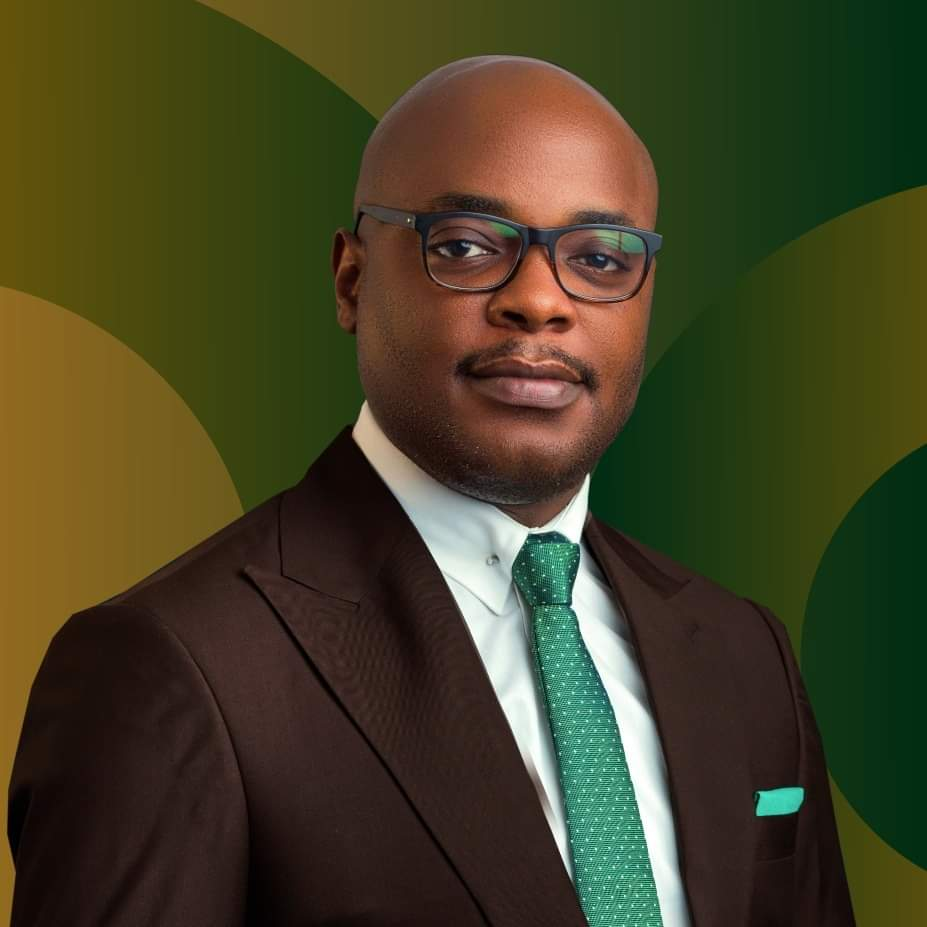
- Born: 9 September 1985 (age 40); Ogbomoso, Nigeria
- Occupation: Politician
- Political party: All Progressives Congress (APC)

Olamijuwonlo Alao Akala (born 9 September 1985) is a Nigerian politician and a current House of Representatives member in the 10th National Assembly, representing Ogbomoso North, South, and Orire Federal constituency since June 2023. He is the Chairman, House of the Representatives Committee on Youth in Parliament. Olamijuwonlo, who is also the son of former Oyo State Governor Adebayo Alao-Akala, served as the Chairman of Ogbomoso North Local Government from 2018 to 2019.

== Early life and education ==
Olamijuwonlo Alao-Akala, the first son of the late Otunba Adebayo Christopher Alao-Akala, a former Governor of Oyo State in southwest Nigeria, pursued his education at Federal Government College, Ogbomoso, and Rainbow College, Surulere, Lagos State. He later earned a bachelor's degree in Computer and Information Science from Lead City University, Ibadan, in 2008. Subsequently, he obtained a master's degree in Service Management from the University of Buckingham, United Kingdom. He is married to Hadiza Okoya, the daughter of a businessman Chief Razaq Akanni Okoya.

== Political career ==
Olamiju's political prominence emerged in 2017 when he was appointed as the Caretaker Chairman of Ogbomoso North Local Government by the former Governor of Oyo State, Late Senator Abiola Ajimobi. He subsequently contested and won the position of substantive Local Government Chairman on May 12, 2018. In 2023, Olamiju was elected to the National Assembly, representing Ogbomoso North, South, and Orire Federal Constituency in the House of Representatives, where he serves as the Chairman of the House Committee on Youths in Parliament.
