= Sunday Afolabi =

Sunday Afolabi may refer to:

- Sunday Afolabi (politician) (1931–2004), Nigerian politician
- Sunday Afolabi (footballer) (born 1999), Nigerian footballer
