= Adegboye Ayinla Gbolagunte =

Nigerian jurist and journalist

Hon. Justice Adegboye Ayinla Gbolagunte

Judge of the High Court of Oyo State
- In office 4 January 2006 – 24 June 2024
- Appointed by: Rashidi Ladoja

Personal details
- Born: December 10, 1959 Lagos State, Nigeria
- Died: June 24, 2024 (aged 64) Ibadan, Oyo State, Nigeria
- Education: University of Lagos (B.Sc), University of Ibadan (LL.B)
- Occupation: Jurist, lecturer

Adegboye Ayinla Gbolagunte (10 December 1959 – 24 June 2024) was a Nigerian jurist who served as a Judge of the High Court of Oyo State from 2006 until his death in 2024. Before his judicial appointment, he worked as a journalist and lecturer.

== Early life and education ==
Gbolagunte was born in Lagos State on 10 December 1959. He was originally from Eruwa in the Ibarapa area of Oyo State. His father, Davidson Mokolade Gbolagunte, was Speaker of the Oyo State House of Assembly during the Second Republic (1979–1983).

He attended Lagos Municipal Primary School in Surulere and Lagos Progressive Primary School. For his secondary education, he studied at Birch Freeman High School, Surulere, and later completed his A‑Levels at the Federal School of Arts and Science, Lagos.

In 1982, he graduated from the University of Lagos with a Bachelor of Science degree in Mass Communication. He subsequently studied law at the University of Ibadan, earning his LL.B. He attended the Nigerian Law School and was called to the Bar in 1987.

== Career ==
Before entering full legal practice, Gbolagunte taught law and communication courses at The Polytechnic, Ibadan, the Nigerian Institute of Journalism, Ogba, Lagos, and the Radio Nigeria Training School, Lagos.

On 4 January 2006, Gbolagunte was appointed to the High Court of Oyo State by Governor Rashidi Ladoja. He served in the Ibadan Judicial Division until his death in 2024.

== Death ==
Gbolagunte died on 24 June 2024 at the age of 64 in Ibadan. A valedictory court session in his honour was held on 22 July 2024, presided over by the Chief Judge of Oyo State, Justice Iyabo Yerima. He was buried in Ibadan after funeral rites, including a service on 26 July 2024 at the New Reservation Area Baptist Church, Iyaganku.
