= Adeniyi Olabode Adebisi =

Nigerian politician and businessman

Hon. Adebisi Adeniyi Olabode

Commissioner for Trade, Industry, Investment, and Cooperatives, Oyo State
- Incumbent
- Assumed office 2023
- Governor: Seyi Makinde

Commissioner for Agriculture and Rural Development, Oyo State
- In office 2021–2023
- Governor: Seyi Makinde

Commissioner for Trade, Industry, Investment, and Cooperatives, Oyo State
- In office 2019–2021
- Governor: Seyi Makinde

Personal details
- Born: 1971 (age 54–55) Saki West, Oyo State, Nigeria
- Education: Ekiti State University
- Occupation: Politician, businessman

Adebisi Adeniyi Olabode (born 1971) is a Nigerian politician and businessman. He has held several political offices in Oyo State and is the Commissioner for Trade, Industry, Investment, and Cooperatives. He has also served as Commissioner for Agriculture and Rural Development.

== Early life and education ==
Olabode was born in 1971 in Saki West Local Government Area of Oyo State. He studied Technical Education at the University of Ado‑Ekiti (now Ekiti State University), graduating with a bachelor's degree in 2002. He later obtained a Diploma in Project Management Essentials from the Management and Strategic Institute in the United States.

== Career ==
Olabode's political involvement began at the local level. Between 1999 and 2000, he served as party secretary for the Alliance for Democracy in Saki West Local Government. He later became party secretary for Oyo North Senatorial District under the same party. In 2003, he was appointed Auditor for the Alliance for Democracy. He also held positions connected to national campaigns, including State Secretary for the Atiku Abubakar Presidential Campaign Committee in 2007 and Coordinator of Grassroots Mobilisation for Atiku Abubakar's 2019 presidential bid.

In 2019, he was nominated by the Oyo State governor as a commissioner and subsequently appointed Commissioner for Trade, Industry, Investment, and Cooperatives.

He has also held the portfolio of Commissioner for Agriculture and Rural Development in Oyo State.
