= Mohammed Shata =

Nigerian politician

Minister of National Planning
- Incumbent
- Assumed office July 1999

Minister of Internal Affairs
- Preceded by: Sunday Afolabi
- Succeeded by: Iyorchia Ayu

Personal details
- Born: 15 January 1950 (age 76)

Mohammed Shata is a Nigerian politician who served in the cabinet of President Olusegun Obasanjo between 1999 and 2003.

== Obasanjo cabinet ==
In July 1999 the Senate cleared the appointment by President Olusegun Obasanjo of Shata as Minister of National Planning.

As Minister of State for Internal Affairs, in September 2000 Shata said that one-third of the 44,000 people awaiting trial in Nigeria were in jail. He said 9,707 prison service officers had been promoted to enhance productivity.

In October 2001 Shata said that Niger and Nigeria would soon launch joint border patrols along their borders to check trans-border crimes.

In November 2001 Shata said the government was planning to issue special identity cards to foreigners living in the country to improve security due to the 11 September attacks in the US.

As Minister of Internal Affairs, in January 2003 Shata blamed "mischief makers" for a report that immigration service officers were planning to go on strike.

The same month, he said preparations for the launch of the national identity card system on 18 February were going on smoothly, with 10 billion naira in funding to pay subcontractors.

In May 2003 Shata announced that Nigeria's population was between 160 and 170 million, rather than the projected 120 million, based on matching voter registration and ID card registration numbers.

== Later career ==
After he left office, Shata, along with his predecessor as Internal Affairs Minister Sunday Afolabi and former Labour Minister Hussaini Akwanga were arraigned for alleged corruption related to the National Identity Card plan. They were granted bail in December 2003. The first National Secretary of the Peoples Democratic Party (PDP), former Governor of Enugu State, Okwesilieze Nwodo and the Permanent Secretary of the Ministry of Internal Affairs were also granted bail.
