= Odolaye Aremu =

Nigerian artist

Alhaji Odolaye Aremu Mohammodu Odolaye Aremu
- Born: 1943; Ilorin
- Origin: Ilorin
- Died: 1997 (aged 53–54)
- Genres: Dadakuada
- Occupations: Folks Musician, Praise Singer
- Instruments: Gangan, Bata Talking Drum
- Label: Olatubosun Records

Mohammodu Odolaye Aremu (1943-1997) was an Ilorin-born Dadakuada artist who sang in many Yoruba cities and recorded many albums until he died in 1997. During his life, he lived in many places including Ibadan, Ilorin, Abeokuta, Okeho, Shaki and Lagos. However, he spent most of his time in Ibadan.

== Early life ==
Odolaye Arẹmu was a renowned Yoruba oral poet and musician from Ilorin, Nigeria. Born and raised in Ilorin, he later based himself in Ibadan during the 1960s and 1980s.

== Musical career ==
Like many Yoruba musicians, he sang praises of many important and famous people in society. This includes Dr. Olusola Saraki, Chief Alhaji Abdul-Azeez Arisekola Alao; Alhaji Jimoh Saro, Chief Meredith Adisa Akinloye, Oba Lamidi Adeyemi III, Chief Ladoke Akintola, Ariyibi Adedibu and many others.

== Music and style ==
Odolaye was a prominent exponent of Dadakuada music, a traditional Yoruba genre. His songs combined oriki (praise songs) and owe (proverbs and epigrams), addressing social, political, economic, and cultural issues.

== Historical significance ==
Odolaye's music serves as a valuable historical resource, providing insights into Yoruba oral literature and historical events.

== Themes and commentary ==
Odolaye's songs entertained, educated, and mobilized his audience, tackling issues like national unity and survival. He presented himself as informed about Nigeria and its problems, often commenting on contemporary events.

== Legacy ==
As a partisan poet, Odolaye supported various political parties during Nigeria's First, Second, and aborted Third Republics. His music remains an important part of Yoruba cultural heritage, offering unique perspectives on Nigerian history and society.

== Discography ==
• Olowe Mowe

• Alakori Alakowe

• Eniyan Nlanla Lo

• Ilorin Lawa
