= 2007 Oyo State gubernatorial election =

Nigerian state election

- 14 April 2007
Nominee	Christopher Alao-Akala	Abiola Ajimobi
Party	PDP	ANPP
Popular vote	357,972	239,189
Governor before election
Rasheed Ladoja
PDP
Elected Governor
Christopher Alao-Akala
PDP

The 2007 Oyo State gubernatorial election was the 6th gubernatorial election of Oyo State. Held on 14 April 2007, the People's Democratic Party nominee Christopher Alao-Akala won the election, defeating Abiola Ajimobi of the All Nigeria Peoples Party.

== Results ==
A total of 15 candidates contested in the election. Christopher Alao-Akala from the People's Democratic Party won the election, defeating Abiola Ajimobi from the All Nigeria Peoples Party. Registered voters was 1,793,476.

2007 Oyo State gubernatorial election
Party	Candidate	Votes	%	±%
PDP	Christopher Alao-Akala	357,972		
ANPP	Abiola Ajimobi	239,189		
PDP hold				
