= Sunday Afolabi (politician) =

Nigerian politician (1931–2004)

Minister for Internal Affairs
- In office June 1999 – 29 May 2003
- President: Olusegun Obasanjo
- Succeeded by: Mohammed Shata

Minister of Education
- In office October 1983 – December 1983
- President: Shehu Shagari

Deputy Governor of Oyo State
- In office 1 October 1979 – 1982
- Governor: Bola Ige
- Succeeded by: Adebisi Akande

Personal details
- Born: 1931
- Died: 10 May 2004 (aged 72–73) London, United Kingdom
- Party: Unity Party of Nigeria (1979–1982); National Party of Nigeria (1982–1983); Social Democratic Party (1991–1993); Peoples Democratic Party (1998–2004)
- Occupation: Politician

Chief Sunday Afolabi (1931 – 10 May 2004) was a Nigerian politician who served in the cabinet of President Olusegun Obasanjo as Minister of Internal Affairs from 1999 to 2003. He also served as Minister of Education in the cabinet of President Shehu Shagari from 1982 to 1983. He previously served as deputy governor of Oyo State from 1979 to 1982 under Governor Bola Ige.

== Background ==
Sunday Afolabi was born in Iree, Osun State, of Yoruba origin.

His traditional titles are Oloye Bada of Ile-Ife and Oloye Asiwaju Apesin of Oshogbo.,

Afolabi attended Offa Grammar School in Kwara State (1948–1950) and Baptist Boys High School, Abeokuta (1951–1953). He became an Accounts Clerk at United African Company (1953–1954), then worked at Bank of British West Africa, later called Standard Bank and now First Bank of Nigeria (1954–1961). He was Chief Accountant at the University of Ibadan (1961–1978).

== Early political career ==
Afolabi became a member and leader of the Action Group, Osun Division. In the Nigerian Second Republic (1979–1983) Afolabi was a member of Chief Obafemi Awolowo's Unity Party of Nigeria (UPN). He served as deputy governor of Oyo State when Bola Ige was governor. Later he moved over to the National Party of Nigeria (NPN), and became Minister of Education in the Shehu Shagari government.

Afolabi was a member of the defunct Social Democratic Party in the lead-up to the abortive Third Nigerian Republic (1989–1993), and the Peoples Democratic Movement led by Shehu Musa Yar'Adua. He became a member of the Peoples Democratic Party (PDP) in 1998 in the lead up to the Fourth Nigerian Republic.

== Fourth Republic ==
Afolabi backed Olusegun Obasanjo's successful bid for presidency in 1999.

He was appointed Minister of the Interior in June 1999.

He said he did not beg to serve in the government, but the president voluntarily asked "me to pick any ministry of my choice". However, his appointment may have been because he was one of the few Yoruba supporters of Obasanjo.

He worked with Bola Ige to create the pro-Obasanjo Yoruba Council of Elders to support Obasanjo's bid for reelection in 2003.

As Minister of Interior, Afolabi reported that the government allocated NGN2.4 billion for prison reforms in 2001.

He was strong proponent of the National Identity Card project, to be used for the 2003 Federal and State elections.

The Independent Corrupt Practices Commission (ICPC) arrested Afolabi on 5 December 2003 during the Commonwealth Heads of Government Meeting.

In December 2003 Afolabi stood trial along with his successor as Internal Affairs minister Mohammed Shata, former Labour Minister Hussaini Akwanga and others on charges that they had sought bribes worth some $2m from the French firm, Sagem in connection with the $214m contract to produce identity cards.

He and the other accused were granted bail on 31 December 2003.

Afolabi died of a kidney related illness in London in May 2004 at the age of 73. In June 2004, the court dropped all charges against him.
