= List of Nigerian bloggers =

This is a list of notable Nigerian bloggers.

- Luvvie Ajayi
- Tosin Ajibade
- Judith Audu
- Noble Igwe
- Linda Ikeji
- Chude Jideonwo
- Tolu Ogunlesi
- Japheth J. Omojuwa
- Kemi Omololu-Olunloyo
- Seun Osewa
- Uche Pedro
- Kola Tubosun
- Myne Whitman
- Adebola Williams
