= Paul Tarfa =

Nigerian military officer (born 1941)

Major General Paul C. Tarfa CON

Commandant of the Nigerian Defence Academy
- In office January 1984 – December 1985
- Preceded by: Brig-Gen Abdullahi Shelleng
- Succeeded by: Maj-Gen Peter Adomokai

Governor of Oyo State
- In office July 1978 – October 1979
- Preceded by: David Jemibewon
- Succeeded by: Bola Ige

Personal details
- Born: 6 August 1941 (age 85) Garkida, Northern Region, British Nigeria (now in Adamawa State, Nigeria)
- Education: Nigerian Defence Academy; Royal Canadian School of Infantry

Military service
- Allegiance: Nigeria
- Branch/service: Nigerian Army
- Years of service: 1962–1988
- Rank: Major General

Paul Chabri Tarfa CON (born 6 August 1941) is a retired Nigerian army major general who was appointed Governor of Oyo State, during the military regime of General Olusegun Obasanjo, handing over to the elected civilian governor Bola Ige.

== Early life ==
He was appointed commandant of the Nigerian Defence Academy, Kaduna. Under the military rule of General Murtala Mohammed (July 1975 – February 1976), Lieutenant-Colonel Tarfa became provost marshal general and was responsible, reporting to General Theophilus Danjuma, for the clean-up campaign in the four divisions of the army. He was then given the almost impossible task of reducing traffic congestion in Lagos. He was appointed Governor of Oyo State from July 1978 to October 1979. When Ernest Shonekan came to power in November 1993, the Federal Government set up the Major-General Paul Tarfa Panel to undertake a one-year probe of the activities of the Nigeria Customs Service.

== Bibliography ==
- Paul C. Tarfa, Olugbemiga Akin-Williams (2007). Profile in courage. Spectrum Books. ISBN 978-029-796-0.
