= Dadakuada =

Music genre

Dadakuada is a type of Yoruba performance art form which originated from and is popular among the people of Kwara.

== History and Performance ==
Dadakuada started about three hundred years ago, according to folktales. Its lyrics basically are made of eulogy, ballad (ijala), incantation, invocation and some abusive words or some fun words. It is a folk genre of music similar to juju music and other types of folk music. Dadakuada is very rich in beats which are derived from traditional instruments like talking drum, bata, gangan and agogo. Its singers are always in a band or what seems like a band, it contains a lead singer and others who support him as he is singing. The supporters are the accompanist, lead drummer, drummer, money-keeper and assistant vocalist. They are always seated in a semi-circle and they perform in any event, ranging from naming ceremonies to funeral. Later on the music genre spread to other south-western parts of Nigeria. They have an apprenticeship program where an upcoming dadakuada singer follows a professional singer to any function he has. Notable dadakuada musicians: Odolaye Aremu, Aremu Ose, Jiayegbade Alao, Baba Eyin Oke, Balu Iyabo.
