= Rauf Olaniyan =

Nigerian politician and engineer (born 1960)

Deputy Governor of Oyo State
- In office 29 May 2019 – 18 July 2022
- Governor: Seyi Makinde
- Preceded by: Moses Alake Adeyemo
- Succeeded by: Bayo Lawal

Personal details
- Born: Rauf Aderemi Olaniyan; 25 February 1960 (age 66)
- Party: All Progressives Congress
- Spouse: Bolanle Olaniyan
- Education: University of Nigeria
- Occupation: Politician; engineer; farmer

Rauf Aderemi Olaniyan (born 25 February 1960) is a Nigerian politician, civil engineer and farmer who served as the deputy governor of Oyo State from 2019 to 2022 when he was impeached following misconduct and a series of allegations leveled against him. He was elected deputy governor as the running mate of Seyi Makinde in the 2019 Oyo State gubernatorial election. He usually spoke on behalf of the governor on matters arising within the state for national interest.

Rauf was born into the family of late Pa Adeleke Olaniyan and Alhaja Sabiatu Olaniyan of Igboho in Oyo State. He is the managing director of WestMidland Construction Company and chairman and chief executive officer of BlueLine Construction Services, Ibadan.

== Early life and education ==
Rauf Olaniyan began his Primary School Education at Baptist Primary School, Igboho; and proceeded to Irepo Grammar school, Igboho for his Secondary school Education. He moved to the East for his University Education at the University of Nigeria, Nsukka, then Anambra State. Olaniyan studied Civil Engineering. He graduated with the class of 1985. He left Nigeria to continue his studies in the United Kingdom, Belgium and the United States of America.

== Political career ==
Olaniyan has served in various offices at the local, state and federal levels of government in Nigeria. For about three decades, he has worked in the civil service of Oyo State for different administration.

Olaniyan served during Projects like the Oyo North Agricultural development Project ONADEP (a World Bank Financed Project), Multi-State Roads Projects also financed by World Bank. His background in Civil Engineering led to his appointment as the pioneer general manager of Oyo State Road Maintenance Agency (OYSROMA) where he later became Permanent Secretary of the Agency.

He retired in 2011 as a Permanent Secretary in Oyo State civil service.

== Deputy governor ==
Olaniyan was elected deputy governor of Oyo State in 2019. He was impeached on 18 July 2022 based on allegations of gross misconduct.

== Professional affiliation ==
Rauf Olaniyan has professional qualifications in Management, Irrigation & Water Resources and in Conflict and Dispute Resolutions.

- Fellow of the Institute of Public Administration.
- Fellow Civilian Institute of Democratic Administration.
- Fellow Nigeria Society of Engineers (FNSE).
- Member of the Council for the Regulation of Engineers in Nigeria, COREN.

== Personal life ==
Olaniyan is married to Prof Bolanle Olaniyan with three children, namely Kayode Olaniyan, Zainab Olaniyan and Ridwan Olaniyan

== Achievements and awards ==
- Awarded "HOPE OF THE MASSES" by the National Youth Council of Nigeria in recognition of his service to the youths of the nation.

== See also ==
- List of Yoruba people
