= Tunji Olurin =

Nigerian politician and general (1944–2021)

Brigadier General Tunji Olurin

Administrator of Ekiti State
- In office 19 October 2006 – 27 April 2007
- Preceded by: Ayo Fayose (as governor)
- Succeeded by: Tope Ademiluyi (acting)

Commander, ECOMOG Peacekeeping Force, Liberia
- In office December 1992 – October 1993
- Preceded by: Maj-Gen. I. Bakut
- Succeeded by: Maj-Gen. J. Shagaya

Military Governor of Oyo State
- In office September 1985 – July 1988
- Preceded by: Lt. Col. Oladayo Popoola
- Succeeded by: Col. Sasaenia Oresanya

Personal details
- Born: 3 December 1944 Ilaro, Southern Region, British Nigeria (now in Ogun State, Nigeria)
- Died: 20 August 2021 (aged 76)
- Party: Peoples Democratic Party
- Occupation: Politician; military officer
- Awards: Knight Commander HOAR

Military service
- Allegiance: (Nigeria)
- Branch/service: Nigerian Army
- Years of service: 1967–1993
- Rank: Brigadier General
- Unit: Commander, 1st Mechanized Brigade, Minna; GOC, 3rd Armoured Division, Jos
- Commands: ECOMOG Peacekeeping Force
- Battles/wars: First Liberian Civil War

Adetunji Idowu Ishola Olurin mni (Yoruba: Adétúnjí Ìdòwú Ìṣọ̀lá Olúrìn; 3 December 1944 – 20 August 2021) was a Nigerian general who served as the military Governor of Oyo State from 1985 to 1988 and Field Commander of ECOMOG Peacekeeping Force in Liberia from 1992 to 1993 during the First Liberian Civil War. Olurin retired from service in 1993, and was a member of Peoples Democratic Party (PDP). He was administrator of Ekiti State from 19 October 2006 until 27 April 2007.

== Birth and education ==
Tunji Olurin was born at Ilaro to Chief M. A. O. Olurin, the Agoro of Ilaro, and Madam Abigail Fola Olurin. He was educated at Egbado College (now Yewa College), and attended the Technical College, Ibadan (now Ibadan Polytechnic) in 1966. He became a trainee at the Times Press in Apapa, Lagos. In 1967, he entered the Nigerian Defence Academy (NDA), Kaduna, where he obtained his NDA Certificate of Education. He attended many professional courses during his army career. He was a graduate of the School of Infantry, Quetta, Pakistan, the Command and Staff College, Jaji, Kaduna and the National Institute for Policy and Strategic Studies, Kuru, Jos.

== Military career ==
Olurin enrolled into the Nigerian Army in 1967 as an officer cadet of the 3rd Regular Course where he obtained his NDACE (Nigerian Defence Academic of Education) and was commissioned a Second Lieutenant in the Nigerian Army in March 1970. He became the Brigade Battalion commander in Kainji in 1973, and was the Deputy Assistant Quartermaster General of the Nigerian Defence Academy, Kaduna.

He was Deputy Defence Adviser to the Nigerian High Commission in India (1975–1978) with the rank of major. After attending Staff College in 1978, he was deployed to the United Nations Peace Keeping Operation in Lebanon, where he commanded the Nigerian troops in the United Nations Interim Force in Lebanon (UNIFIL). His battalion was deployed between the Palestinian and Israeli forces. In 1981, as General Staff Officer Operations at Army Headquarters, he mobilized the OAU peacekeeping force in Chad. This force included troops from Nigeria, Senegal, Kenya and Zaire. Also in 1981, he conducted operations in Kano to suppress rebels led by religious fundamentalist.

At the time of the August 1985 coup, when Major General Muhammadu Buhari was removed form office, Lt. Col. Olurin was Commander of the 1st Mechanized Brigade, Minna. He was "aware" but not "active" in the coup. After the coup, he was appointed the Military Governor of Oyo State (1985–1988). During his tenure as governor, he was a member of the National Council of States. In 1987, he set up a committee that in 1988 recommended the establishment of what became the Ladoke Akintola University of Technology.

In 1990, Olurin became the General officer commanding the 3rd Armoured Division in Jos and a member of the Armed Forces Ruling Council. He served as a Field Commander in the ECOMOG Peacekeeping Force in Liberia from December 1992 to September 1993, when he was relieved by Brigadier General John Nanzip Shagaya. He used his trusted relationship with the Nigerian head of state, General Ibrahim Babangida, to obtain more troops for the mission, and by January 1993 had 16,000 troops under his command of whom 12,000 were Nigerian. Olurin was determined to force Charles Taylor onto the defensive. His aggressive tactics were militarily successful, forcing the NPFL to open negotiations by July 1993, although he was accused of showing favoritism to certain Liberian political groups.

== Later career ==
On 9 March 2002, Tunji Olurin was elected President of the Yewa Group (YG), formed to develop Yewaland in Ogun State.

On 26 September 2006, the Ekiti State House of Assembly impeached the governor, Ayodele Fayose and his deputy Abiodun Christine Olujimi, alleging gross misconduct. On 19 October 2006, President Olusegun Obasanjo declared a State of Emergency in Ekiti State and suspended the governor, deputy governor and House of Assembly of the state. He appointed Tunji Olurin, as "Sole Administrator" on Ekiti State. The State of Emergency was ratified by the National Assembly on 26 October. Soon after being appointed, Olurin dissolved the local government councils, who were under investigation by the Economic and Financial Crimes Commission (EFCC) for allegedly misappropriating about 7.3 billion naira.

In March 2007, Tunji Olurin ordered the Ekiti State radio and television stations not to broadcast programs of the Action Congress (AC) candidate for the state governorship, Kayode Fayemi, while allowing broadcasts by the PDP. Olurin remained in charge until he was replaced by Tope Ademiluyi on 27 April 2007. He has since remained in political oblivion following his loss at the Ogun State Governorship Election in 2011.

== Awards and honours ==
Olurin has lectured on peacekeeping at the International Peace Academy, the National War College, and United Nations seminars in Ghana, Nigeria, and Senegal. In 2006, he was appointed the Chancellor of the First University of Education in Nigeria, TASUED by Governor Gbenga Daniel of Ogun State.

Olurin has been the recipient of many honours, including the United Nations Peace Medal and the Knight Commander of the Humane Order of African Redemption (KCHOAR), Liberia's highest national honour award. He was an honorary paramount chief in the Republic of Liberia.

Tunji Olurin died on 21 August 2021.
