= Luvvie Ajayi =

Author

- Born: Ifeoluwa Ajayi; January 5, 1985 (age 41); Nigeria
- Education: University of Illinois at Urbana–Champaign
- Occupations: Author, digital strategist
- Notable work: I'm Judging You: The Do-Better Manual; Professional Troublemaker: The Fear Fighter Manual; Rising Troublemakers: A Fear-Fighter Manual for Teens
- Website: awesomelyluvvie.com

Luvvie Ajayi (born Ifeoluwa Ajayi on January 5, 1985), also known as Luvvie Ajayi Jones, is a Nigerian–American author, speaker, and digital strategist. Her book, I'm Judging You: The Do-Better Manual, was a New York Times best-seller.

== Early life ==
Ajayi was born in Nigeria; she moved to Chicago with her family when she was nine. She attended Whitney M. Young Magnet High School in Chicago, then the University of Illinois at Urbana-Champaign, studying psychology.

== Career ==
Ajayi began her career in marketing and digital strategy, and started blogging in 2003. Her site AwesomelyLuvvie.com amassed a following, particularly for Ajayi's recaps of television shows like Scandal, drawing the attention of Scandal showrunner Shonda Rhimes. In 2016, The New York Times reported that Ajayi had an audience of approximately 500,000 between her personal Twitter feed and the Awesomely Luvvie website.

Ajayi published her first book, I'm Judging You: The Do-Better Manual, with Henry Holt & Co in September 2016; it debuted at number five on the New York Times best-seller list. Ajayi has said the inspiration for the book came after she learned a journalist had plagiarized several paragraphs of her writing—and when confronted, he said he was unaware he should have credited her work. Consequently, a "return to ethics—a return to a higher level of behavior for oneself and others—becomes the central idea of Ajayi’s book," in The Root's description, but the "collection of witty essays is less about pointing fingers and more about building a positive, healthy self and society." The Chicago Tribune called the book "whip-smart, take-no-prisoners hilarious." Shonda Rhimes and Betsy Beers have acquired I'm Judging You to adapt as a cable comedy series through their company Shondaland and ABC Signature.

In 2016, Ajayi was the first writer invited to speak at the National Museum of African American History and Culture, and her event sold out.

In 2018, Ajayi launched two podcasts: "Rants and Randomness with Luvvie Ajayi" and "Jesus and Jollof," cohosted by Yvonne Orji.

In 2021, she published Professional Troublemaker: A Fear-Fighter Manual, another New York Times best seller and then published Rising Troublemaker a teens version of her best seller in 2022

In 2023, she published Little Troublemaker makes a mess her first children's book

Ajayi was selected to be the opening speaker for the 2022 Public Library Association conference and was the closing speaker for the 2022 American Library Association conference.

== Personal life ==
Ajayi is a member of Delta Sigma Theta and the International Academy of Digital Arts and Sciences.

== Bibliography ==
- I'm Judging You: The Do-Better Manual (2016, Holt McDougal)
- Professional Troublemaker: A Fear-Fighter Manual (2021, Penguin Life)
- Rising Troublemaker: A Fear-Fighter Manual for Teens (2022, Philomel Books)

== See also ==
- List of Nigerian bloggers
- List of Nigerian writers
