= Executive Council of Oyo State =

Executive arm of a state government in Nigeria

The Oyo State Executive Council (informally, the Cabinet of Oyo State) is the highest formal governmental body that plays important roles in the Oyo State Government headed by the Governor of Oyo State. It consists of the Deputy Governor, Secretary to the State Government, Chief of Staff, Commissioners who preside over ministerial departments, and the Governor's special aides.

== Functions ==
The Executive Council exists to advise and direct the Governor. Their appointment as members of the Executive Council gives them the authority to execute power over their fields.

== Current cabinet ==
The current Executive Council is serving under the Engineer Seyi Makinde administration. He was elected as governor of Oyo State at the gubernatorial election of 9 March 2019. He was sworn in as the 18th Governor of Oyo State on 29 May 2019.

Office	Incumbent
President of the Executive Council and Governor	Engineer Seyi Makinde
Deputy President of the Executive Council and Deputy Governor	Barr. Bayo Lawal
Secretary to the State Government	Prof. Musibau Babatunde
Chief of Staff	Hon. Akinwale Solomon Akinwole
Head of Service	Mrs. Adenike A. Fasina mni
Commissioner for Environment and Natural Resources	Hon. Ademola Temitayo Aderinto
Commissioner for Budget and Economic Planning	Barr. Ayobami Oluwaseun Ojo
Commissioner for Special Duties	Dr. Lateef Idowu Oyeleke
Commissioner for Education, Science and Technology	Hon. Olusegun Olayiwola
Commissioner for Justice	Barr. Abiodun Aikomo
Commissioner for Lands, Housing & Urban Development	Mr. William Akin-Funmilayo
Commissioner for Local Government and Chieftaincy Matters	Hon. Ademola Ojo
Commissioner for Energy and Mineral Resources	Prof Kehinde Dahud Sangodoyin
Commissioner for Agriculture and Rural Development	Barr. Olasunkanmi Olaleye
Commissioner for Trade, Industry, Investment and Cooperatives	
Commissioner for Information, Culture and Orientation	Prince Dotun Oyelade
Commissioner for Finance	Mr Akinola Ojo
Commissioner for Health	Dr. Oluwaserimi Adewumi Ajetunmobi
Commissioner for Establishment and Training	Prof. Solihu Abdulwaheed Adelabu
Commissioner for Youth & Sports	Hon. Wasilat Adegoke Adefemi
Commissioner for Public Works, Infrastructure and Transport	Hon. Abdulmojeed Mogbonjubola
Commissioner for Women Affairs and Social Inclusion	Hon. (Alhaja) Faosat Joke Sanni

=== Special Advisers ===
Incumbent	Office
Mr. Bolaji Olajide Ajani	Special Adviser, Media
Mr. Olasunkanmi Adebowale Akande	Special Adviser, Agric Business
Mr. Samuel Ademola Adejumobi	Special Adviser, Legislative Matters
Alhaji Omokunmi Mustapha	Special Adviser, Political Matters
Fatai A Owoseni	Special Adviser, Oyo state Security Trust Funds
Chief. Adeyemi Aderibigbe	Special Adviser, Local Government and Chieftaincy Matters
	Special Adviser, Economic Affairs
Engr. Adepoju Simiyu Adekola James	Special Adviser, Infrastructure
Akinsete Olakunle	Special Adviser, Housing and urban development

=== Senior Special Assistants ===
Office	Incumbent
Senior Special Assistant To The Executive Governor On Students Affairs	Hon. Olojede Victor Dideoluwa (OVD)
Senior Special Assistant To The Executive Governor (Domestic)	Mr. Tolulope Oladiran Kuku
Senior Special Assistant To The Executive Governor on Project	Abiodun Oluwaseun (LAUREL)
Senior Special Assistant for Better Education Service Delivery For All	Mr. Moses Sunday Adeyanju
Senior Special Assistants on Economic Planning	Mr. Kehinde Oluwaseyi Ogunsanya
