= Victor Omololu Olunloyo =

Nigerian politician (1935–2025)

Governor of Oyo State
- In office 1 October 1983 – 31 December 1983
- Deputy: Olatunji Mohammed
- Preceded by: Bola Ige
- Succeeded by: Oladayo Popoola

Personal details
- Born: Victor Omololu Sowemimo Olunloyo; 14 April 1935 Ibadan, Colony and Protectorate of Nigeria
- Died: 6 April 2025 (aged 89)
- Party: National Party of Nigeria (1979–1983); Peoples Democratic Party (1998–2012); Action Congress of Nigeria (2012–2013)
- Spouses: Olufunmilayo Olaitan Olunloyo; Aderonke Omololu-Olunloyo
- Children: 10, including Kemi
- Education: University of St Andrews
- Occupation: Politician

Victor Omololu Sowemimo Olunloyo (14 April 1935 – 6 April 2025) was a Nigerian mathematician and politician who served as the governor of Oyo State from 1 October 1983 to 31 December 1983, when the military regime of General Muhammadu Buhari took power. He later became a power in the Peoples Democratic Party (PDP) in Oyo State.

== Background ==
Victor Omololu Sowemimo Olunloyo was born in Ibadan on 14 April 1935. His father, Horatio Olunloyo was Christian and his late mother Alhaja Bintu Tejumola Abebi Olunloyo who died October 2013 at 102 years old was Muslim. His father died in December 1948 when Victor Olunloyo was 13 years old. Olunloyo gained a PhD from St. Andrews University in 1961. His thesis was on the Numerical Determination of the Solutions of Eigenvalue Problems of the Sturm–Liouville Type. He published several other papers on number theory and applied mathematics.

Olunloyo was appointed Commissioner for Economic Development for the Western Region in 1962 at the age of 27, in the cabinet of Dr. Moses Majekodunmi. He was re-appointed when Colonel Adeyinka Adebayo was appointed military governor of Western State. Other positions included Commissioner for Community Development, Education (twice), Special Duties, Local Government and Chieftaincy Affairs which includes crowning of two of Nigeria's monarchs namely the Alaafin of Oyo, Oba Lamidi Adeyemi III and the Soun of Ogbomosho King Oyewunmi. He was appointed chairman of the Western Nigerian Development Corporation.

Olunloyo died on 6 April 2025, at the age of 89.

== Governor of Oyo State ==
In 1983, Olunloyo ran for governor of the old Oyo State on the National Party of Nigeria (NPN) platform, and defeated the incumbent, Bola Ige of the Unity Party of Nigeria (UPN), assuming office in October 1983. His term ended three months later when General Muhammadu Buhari took power and dismissed the elected government on 31 December 1983.

== Later career ==
In November 2002, Olunloyo said he would be a candidate for governor of Oyo State in the April 2003 elections. However, Rasheed Ladoja was eventually chosen as the PDP candidate. In 2009, he was chairman of a panel to investigate the collapse of a part of the Pharmacy section of the Ladoke Akintola University of Technology. The panel laid blame on the contractor and on the state government, drawing attack from the Oyo State governor Adebayo Alao-Akala. He was elected chairman of the PDP Planning and Strategy Committee for Ibadanland to prepare for the 2011 election, and was also made chairman of the PDP Media and Publicity Committee for the state. In 2012, Olunloyo abandoned the PDP political party and joined ACN.
