= Bayo Lawal =

Nigerian politician and lawyer (born 1954)

His Excellency Bayo Lawal

Deputy Governor of Oyo State
- Incumbent
- Assumed office 18 July 2022
- Governor: Seyi Makinde
- Preceded by: Rauf Olaniyan

Oyo State Commissioner of Justice
- In office 1999–2003
- Governor: Lam Adesina

Personal details
- Born: Abdulraheem Adebayo Adeleke Lawal; 14 April 1954 (age 72) Kishi, Irepo, Southern Region, British Nigeria (now in Oyo State, Nigeria)
- Party: Allied Peoples Movement
- Spouse: Ajibike Lawal
- Education: University of Ibadan
- Occupation: Politician; lawyer

Abdulraheem Adebayo Adeleke Lawal (born 14 April 1954) is a Nigerian lawyer and politician who has served as the deputy governor of Oyo State since July 2022, he was appointed to the position following the impeachment of Rauf Olaniyan on grounds of misconduct and a series of allegations leveled against him.

He was Chairman, Oyo State Housing Corporation. He graduated from the University of Ibadan with a bachelor's degree in law. He was appointed as Commissioner of Justice and Attorney General of Oyo State in 1999 by Lam Adesina and served till 2003.
