= Dapo Lam Adesina =

Nigerian politician (born 1978)

Hon Dapo Lam Adesina
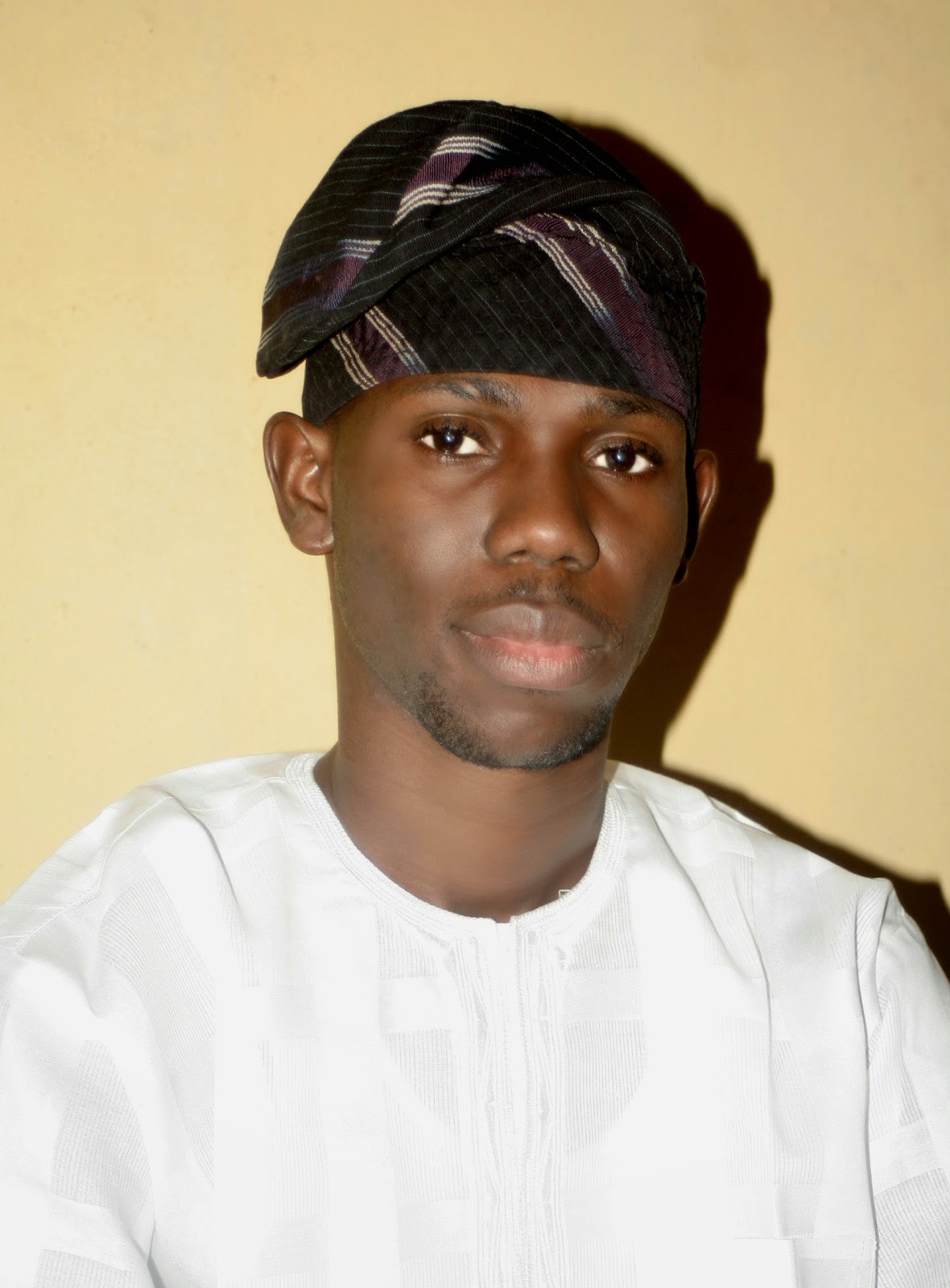

Member of the Nigerian House of Representatives
- In office 9 June 2015 – 9 June 2019
- Preceded by: Adebukola A. Ajaja
- Constituency: Ibadan North East/South East Federal Constituency

Personal details
- Born: 29 October 1978 (age 47) Ibadan, Oyo, Nigeria
- Party: All Progressives Congress
- Parent: Lam Adesina (father)
- Education: University of Ibadan
- Occupation: Legislature

Dapo Lam Adesina (born 25 October 1978) is a Nigerian politician, who was a member of Nigeria's 8th House of Representatives. He is a member of the All Progressives Congress (APC). He represented Ibadan North East/South East Federal constituency of Oyo State between 2015 and 2019. He is currently the Special Assistant Political (South West) to the Speaker of the House of Representatives.

== Early life and education ==
Dapo Lam Adesina was born on 25 October 1978 in Ibadan, Oyo State, Nigeria. He began his basic education at Ayodele Nursery and Primary School in Ibadan, he attended the prestigious Government College Ibadan (GCI), he briefly studied Electrical and Electronics Engineering at The Polytechnic, Ibadan (Eruwa Campus), before moving to the premier University of Ibadan where he graduated from the Agricultural and Environmental Engineering department.

== Professional career ==
Dapo Lam advanced his working career in the oil and gas industry, as he was a principal partner in Skipet Oil Nig. Ltd. He's co-founder and president of Future Initiative Nigeria, a platform for the Nigerian youth. He also serves a patron for Federal Road Safety Commission (FRSC RS 11:32) and a member of the advisory board of Youth Advocators Network.

Dapo lam was an intern at Forestry Research Institute of Nigeria (FRIN) and later at Stabillini Visinoni (a sister company of Bi -Courtney Construction Company) in Lagos. Dapo lam also worked at the Ministry of Agriculture, Enugu State.

== Political career ==
Dapo Lam political career started in 1998 when he was elected as the pioneer secretary, Alliance for Democracy (AD), Youth wing of Ibarapa East local government. Adesina contested for the same position he presently occupies in 2011 under the defunct Action Congress of Nigeria (A.C.N) but lost.

Dapo Lam was appointed as Commissioner for Youth and Sports in Oyo State by Governor Abiola Ajimobi, serving from August 2011 to September 2013. During his tenure, he initiated several programs and activities before being redeployed to the Ministry of Industry, Applied Science and Technology, where he served from November 2013 to December 2014.

Dapo lam resigned in 2014, and was elected as the representative for the Ibadan Northeast/south east constituency in the Federal house of representatives in the 2015 elections.
