= Wande Abimbola =

Nigerian linguist (born 1932)

Chief Ògúnwán̄dé Abím̄bọ́lá
- Born: 24 December 1932 (age 93); Oyo, British Nigeria
- Education: University of Ibadan
- Occupations: Religious leader, university professor and politician

Chief Ògúnwán̄dé "Wán̄dé" Abím̄bọ́lá (born 24 December 1932) is a Nigerian academician, a professor of Yoruba language and literature, and a former vice-chancellor of the University of Ife (now Obafemi Awolowo University). He has also served as the Majority Leader of the Senate of the Federal Republic of Nigeria. Chief Abimbola was installed as Àwísẹ Awo Àgbàyé in 1981 by the Ooni of Ife on the recommendation of a conclave of Babalawos of Yorubaland.

== Academic studies ==
Abimbola received his first degree in history from University College, Ibadan, in 1963 when that college was affiliated to the University of London. He received his master's degree in linguistics from Northwestern University, Evanston, Illinois, in 1966, and his Doctorate of Philosophy in Yoruba Literature from the University of Lagos in 1971. Abimbola was the first PhD graduate of the University of Lagos. He became a full professor in 1976.

Abimbola taught in three Nigerian universities, namely the University of Ibadan from 1963 to 1965, University of Lagos from 1966 to 1972, and the University of Ife from 1972 to 1991. He has also taught at several US universities, including Indiana University, Amherst College, Harvard University, Boston University, Colgate University, and most recently, the University of Louisville. Abimbola has written books on Ifá and Yoruba culture. In 1977, Abimbola's Ifá Divination Poetry was published by NOK publishers.

== Work experience ==
=== University administration ===
- 1982–1989 Vice-chancellor, University of Ile-Ife (now Obafemi Awolowo University).
- 1977–1979 Dean, Faculty of Arts, Obafemi Awolowo University, Ile-Ife.
- 1975–1977; 1979–80; 1981–82 Head, Department of African Languages and Literatures, Obafemi Awolowo University, Ile-Ife. (Wande Abimbola was the founder of this department.)

=== Academic experience ===
- 2004—2005 Distinguished Visiting Scholar in the Department of Liberal Studies, University of Louisville, Louisville, KY.
- 1999 Professor of Humanities in the Department of English, Colgate University, Hamilton, NY.
- 1998—2003 Professor in the Department of Religion, Boston University, Boston, MA.
- 1997 Professor of the Humanities in Africana and Latin American Studies, Colgate University, Hamilton, NY.
- 1996—1997 Fellow, W.E.B. Du Bois Institute & Department of African American Studies, Harvard University, Cambridge.
- 1990—1991 Scholar-in-Residence and visiting professor of Black Studies, Amherst College, Amherst, Massachusetts.
- 1980—1981 Visiting Henry R. Luce Professor of Comparative Religious Ethics, Amherst College, Amherst, Massachusetts.
- 1976—1990 Professor of African Languages and Literatures, Obafemi Awolowo University, Ile-Ife, Nigeria.
- 1973 Associate Professor of Folklore, Indiana University, Bloomington, Indiana.
- 1971 Visiting assistant professor of folklore, Indiana University, Bloomington, Indiana.
- 1966—1972 Lecturer, School of African and Asian Studies, University of Lagos, Lagos, Nigeria.
- 1963—1965 Junior Research Fellow, Institute of African Studies, University of Ibadan, Ibadan, Nigeria.

=== Political, cultural and public service appointments ===
- 2005—to date Director, UNESCO Proclamation of Intangible Cultural Heritage award to Nigeria, Subject Matter: Ifa.
- 2003–2005 Adviser to the Nigerian President on Traditional Matters and Cultural Affairs, Office of the Presidency, Federal Republic of Nigeria, Abuja, Nigeria.
- 1995—1998 Member, Council for the World's Religions.
- 1992—1993 Senate Majority Leader, Senate of the Federal Republic of Nigeria, Abuja, Nigeria.
- 1992 Special Adviser to the Governor of Oyo State, Nigeria.
- 1990—to date Installed as Asiwaju Awo of Remo, Nigeria.
- 1988—1989 Member, Executive Committee, Association of Commonwealth Universities.
- 1986—to date Installed as Elemoso of Ketu, Benin Republic.
- 1981—to date President, International Congress of Orisa Tradition and Culture.
- 1981—to date Installed as Awise Awo Ni Agbaye (literally World Spokesperson for Ifa and Yoruba Religion).
- 1981—1989 chairman, Governing Board, Oyo State College of Arts and Science, Ile-Ife.
- 1979—1982 chairman, Oyo State Tourist Committee.
- 1978—1984 chairman, board of directors, University of Ife Guest Houses Limited.
- 1976—1978 Chairman, Oyo State Broadcasting Corporation.
- 1974—1984 chairman, Board of Governors, Olivet Baptist High School, Olivet Heights, Oyo.
- 1974–1976 chairman, Oyo Zonal Health Board and Member of the State Health Council.
- 1971—to date Consecrated as Babalawo (Ifa Priest).

=== Other professional experience ===
- 1972—1979 Editor, Yoruba, Journal of the Yoruba Studies Association of Nigeria.
- 1970—1972 Editor, Lagos Notes and Records, Bulletin of the Institute of African and Asian Studies, University of Lagos, Lagos, Nigeria
