= Jaiyegbade Alao =

Nigerian musician (1903–2023)

- Also known as: Jaigbade Alao
- Born: Muhammad Àmínù Kúrángà; 1903; Ilorin, Northern Nigeria
- Died: 20 March 2023 (aged 119–120) Ilorin, Kwara State, Nigeria
- Genre: Dadakuada
- Occupations: Musician, composer
- Years active: c. 1939–2022
- Label: Chief Records
- Award: Honorary doctorate from Kwara State University

Muhammad Àmínù Kúrángà (1903 – March 20, 2023), later known as Alhaji Aminullahi Jaigbade Alao, was a Nigerian musician. He is the progenitor of the Dadakuada genre of music, which he started in 1939 and in December 2022, he was recognised by the Kwara State Government as one of the most distinguished personalities in the state.

== Biography ==
Alao was born in 1903, in Ilorin, to Mallam Kuranga, a farmer and Madam Salamatu.

Alao had passion for Dadakuwada, which is a type of music that is common and unique to the people of Kwara State, Nigeria as it is one of their traditional music. though, there are other traditional music but Dadakúàdà seems to be very resonating to the people of Ilorin.

Alao has 47 albums which include: Kama Seyi Lasemo, Eiye Ogongo, Moriba Mokun, Egbe Owodunnu, Orin Oye, Alhaji Yahaya Agbeyangi, Ladimeji Igbaja, Orimi Jenla Jenlowo, Owo Lafi Saiye, Egbe Owo Koniran, Oba Alabi, Imoru Ikoyi Eleni, Gbenle Esa Ojo, Ire Ni Temi among others.

On the celebration of his 120th birthday, Alao retired from music after an eighty-year career.

In 1991, Alao was turbanned as the King of Songs (Oba Olorin) by the late Emir of Ilorin, Alhaji Zulu Karnaini Gambari, and received an honorary doctorate degree in Music from Kwara State University in 2018.

Alao died in 2023, aged 120 or 121, after a brief illness. Nigerian president Muhammadu Buhari solaced his death.
