= 2011 Oyo State gubernatorial election =

State election in Nigeria

- 26 April 2011
Nominee	Abiola Ajimobi	Christopher Alao-Akala
Party	ACN	PDP
Popular vote	420,852	387,132
Governor before election
Christopher Alao-Akala
PDP
Elected Governor
Abiola Ajimobi
ACN

The 2011 Oyo State gubernatorial election was the 7th gubernatorial election of Oyo State. Held on 26 April 2011, the Action Congress of Nigeria nominee Abiola Ajimobi won the election, defeating Christopher Alao-Akala of the People's Democratic Party.

== Results ==
A total of 15 candidates contested in the election. Abiola Ajimobi from the Action Congress of Nigeria won the election, defeating Christopher Alao-Akala from the People's Democratic Party. Registered voters was 2,651,842, valid votes was 1,125,090.

2011 Oyo State gubernatorial election
Party	Candidate	Votes	%	±%
ACN	Abiola Ajimobi	420,852	37.41	
PDP	Christopher Alao-Akala	387,132	34.41	
ACN hold				
