= Kemi Omololu-Olunloyo =

Nigerian activist (born 1964)

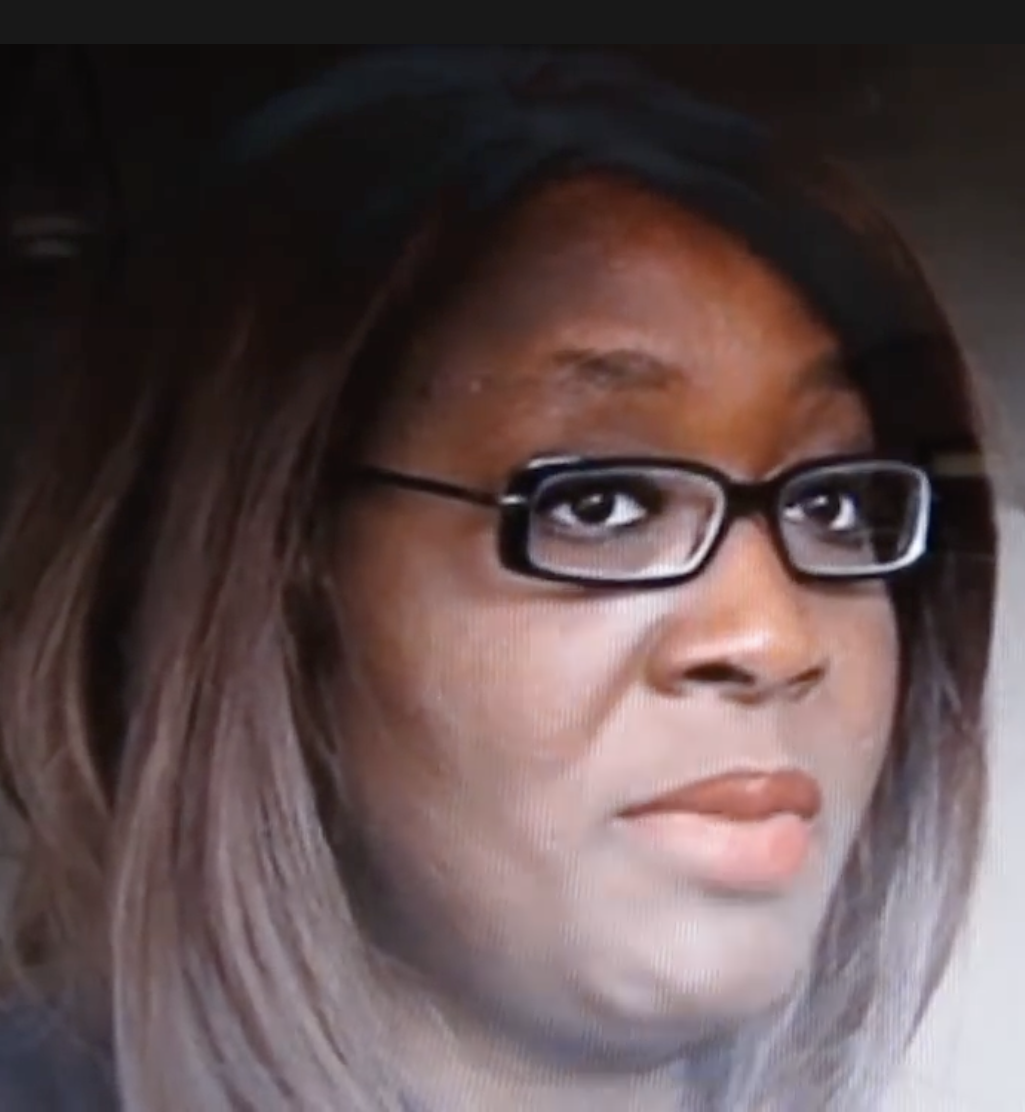
- Born: 6 August 1964 (age 61); Ibadan, Western Region, Nigeria (now in Oyo State, Nigeria)
- Occupations: Blogger, Activist
- Parent: Victor Omololu Olunloyo

Olukemi "Kemi" Omololu-Olunloyo (born 6 August 1964) is a Nigerian blogger, an activist against gun violence and drug abuse, and also a social media personality.

== Background ==
Omololu-Olunloyo is the daughter of former Oyo State governor Victor Omololu Olunloyo and the second of ten children. She lived for 14 years in Nigeria, 20 years in the United States, and five years in Canada . before being arrested and deported from Canada

== Career ==
Omololu-Olunloyo has appeared as a guest discussing terrorism and health topics on CNN, CBC News, Ruptly, CTV News, BBC and Nigerian Television Authority. She also worked briefly as a music journalist with the Nigerian Tribune

== Community and social activism ==
While in Canada, Omololu-Olunloyo was active against gun violence. In 2014 she released the names and photographs of men who solicited sex or exposed themselves on social media.

In 2014, she was among the top three nominees of the Social Media Awards Africa's Social Media Influencer of the Year.

== Deportation from Canada ==
In August 2012, Omololu-Olunloyo was arrested in her apartment in Toronto by agents of the Canada Border Services Agency (CBSA), after allegedly failing to report in monthly as required by CBSA. After being determined a flight risk when her refugee visa was not renewed, she was remanded into custody at the Vanier Centre for Women for seven days before she was deported to Nigeria.

== See also ==
- List of Nigerian bloggers
