= Samuel Ekundayo Alao =

Nigerian Academic

Vice-Chancellor of Adeleke University
- In office 2016–2020
- Succeeded by: Solomon Ajayi Adebola

Personal details
- Born: Samuel Ekundayo Alao
- Education: Oklahoma University, Andrews University
- Profession: Academic

Samuel Ekundayo Alao was a professor and the Vice-Chancellor of Adeleke University before his death. He died at the age of 72 years after brief illness.

== Career ==
Alo was the General Manager of Daily Times Newspapers, Dean and the Deputy Vice-Chancellor of Babcock University before his appointment as the Vice-Chancellor of Achievers University in 2016. He was the VC for 4 years tenure at the school.

== Death ==
Ekundayo Alao died in Ilorin his hometown after a brief illness. After his demise, The Vice-Chancellors of Adeleke University and Babcock University presented a book titled Footprint of Grace which was a biography of deceased Vice-Chancellor which was written to celebrate his second death anniversary.
