= Olivet Baptist High School =

School in Oyo, Nigeria

Olivet Baptist High School is a Baptist secondary school in Oyo, Nigeria (formerly Oyo Baptist Boys' High School), located on a hillcrest named Olivet Heights. It is affiliated with the Nigerian Baptist Convention.

== History ==
It was founded by American International Mission Board on 29 January 1945 on its original site in the premises of the old Baptist mission house at Oke-Isokun, Oyo, Oyo State (now occupied by Baptist College of Theology, Oyo) where Rev. Pinnock, the first Baptist missionary to the ancient empire of Oyo established a mission post.

The profile of Olivet witnessed a remarkable rise in the 1960s when the school was noted for all-round excellence in academics and sports, the school had facilities for O'level and A'level (HSC) candidates at that time. The A'level program was abolished in 1989. The school was one of the few schools in Nigeria outside Lagos equipped with hostel facilities, staff quarters, excellent laboratories (sciences, home economics/food & nutrition, fine arts, music), workshops (metal work, woodwork, technical drawing - mechanical/building), an agricultural center with poultry/fish pond and sports facilities. As a result, Olivet Heights was a domineering force in the western part of Nigeria in inter-school academic competitions/projects as well as sports: soccer, basketball, hockey, handball and athletics. Also available in the school were facilities for Lawn Tennis, Cricket, Squash, Badminton, Volleyball, Chess and Table Tennis. Most of the facilities witnessed a steady decay from the 1990s.

=== Organization of School Houses ===
Olivet Heights was a predominantly residential high school. The hostel structure was organized into four "houses" named after two indigenous and two American Baptist pastors - Atanda, Odetayo, Locket, and Pinnock. In addition to the residential arrangement for boarding students, non-residential students were also assigned to the 4 Houses for annual inter-house (intramural) quiz, debates & sports competitions which are used to unearth promising talents for regional and national competitions. In recent years, two new houses were added - Homer Brown and JBP Lafinhan - in honor of the last American (missionary) Principal and the first Nigerian Principal.

== Principals ==
Since its founding, Olivet Heights has been led by several educators, all of whom are listed below:

- Mrs. J. C. Powell, 1946
- Deacon T. A. Okanla, Headmaster 1945-1952
- Rev. Carl F. Whirley, 1948
- Rev. W. Joel Fergeson, 1948-1951
- Rev. J. B. Durham, Acting Principal 1951
- Rev. M. L. Garrett, Acting Principal 1952-1953
- Mr. E. A. Iyanda, Acting Principal 1955-1957
- Rev. Homer A. Brown, 1957-1962
- Rev. J. B. P. Lafinhan, 1962-1972
- Chief R. F. Fasoranti, 1973-1975
- Chief S. O. Omitade, 1975-1977
- Chief J. I. Popoola, 1977-1982
- Mr. I. A. Adisa, 1982-1989
- Mr. A. A. Adeniran, 1990-1994
- Mr. A. A. Adeniji, 1994-2000
- Mr. S. O. Okegbenle, 2000-2002
- Mrs. F. M. Taiwo, 2002-2008
- Mrs. A. Ayoade, 2008 - 2016
- Chief (Mrs.) A.I. Ogunmola, 2016 - 2017
- Mrs. O.A. Awolola, 2017 - 2019
- Mrs O. Dosunmu, 2019-2024
- Mr J.T Lagbenro, 2024-Date

== Old Students Association ==
Olivet Heights has a vibrant National Old Students Association (NOSA). The Olivet NOSA was founded in 1976 to serve as a reconnection point for former students of Olivet Baptist High School. The Association drives educational and infrastructural projects to ensure that current students have the best possible standard of learning. They have implemented projects like upgrading of learning facilities and sports complex, construction of school hall, donation of computers and other learning aids, and construction of the school gate, among others.

== Motto ==
Cum Christo Progredere (Forward with Christ)

== See also ==
- Federal Government College Ogbomoso
