= Sasaenia Oresanya =

Nigerian politician and general

Major General Adedeji Sasaenia Oresanya

Military Governor of Oyo State
- In office 27 July 1988 – August 1990
- Preceded by: Adetunji Idowu Olurin
- Succeeded by: Abdulkareem Adisa

Personal details
- Born: 13 March 1946
- Died: 22 March 1998 (aged 52)

Military service
- Allegiance: Nigeria
- Branch/service: Nigerian Army
- Rank: Major General

Adedeji Sasaenia Oresanya (13 March 1946 – 22 March 1998) was a Nigerian officer who was Military Governor of Oyo State from July 1988 to August 1990 during the military regime of General Ibrahim Babangida.

Colonel Oresanya signed the Edict establishing the Oyo State University of Technology, later renamed the Ladoke Akintola University of Technology, on 23 April 1990.
