= Abimbola Alao =

British academic

- Born: Abimbola Gbemi Alao; April 1967 (age 59); Ibadan, Nigeria
- Occupations: Literary scholar, author, children's book translator, lecturer

Abimbola Gbemi Alao is a British-Nigerian literary scholar, author, and dementia researcher. She is known for her contributions to creative writing, children's literature, and dementia care, including the development of psychosocial non-pharmacological programmes for individuals with dementia. Alao has authored books such as Desert Haiku and Dear Toriola, Let's Talk About Perimenopause, translated children's classics, and collaborated on projects like the Alzheimer's Society's memory café initiative, which resulted in the anthology "Narrative Adventures from Plymouth Memory Cafes".

Alao has also held academic positions at universities in the United Kingdom, where she taught creative writing and medical humanities. Her work in dementia care earned her the Prime Minister's Dementia Friendly Award in the Schools Category and the BBC Breeze bursary. She also performs storytelling, poetry, and radio musicals for diverse audiences.

== Biography ==
Born in Ibadan, Nigeria, Abimbola's academic journey began at the University of Ibadan, where she earned a BA (Hon) degree in classics in 1988 and an MA Classics in 1991. She later moved to the UK, where she pursued further studies, obtaining a PGCE and an MA in Creative Writing from the University of Plymouth in 2001 and 2009 respectively. In 2023, she completed her PhD at the University of Lapland, Lapin yliopisto in Finland. focusing on the prevalence of Frontotemporal Dementia (FTD) and raising awareness for early diagnosis.

Abimbola is the author of several acclaimed books, including Desert Haiku (2023), Dear Toriola, Let's Talk About Perimenopause (2019), Trickster Tales for Telling (2016), How to Enhance Your Storytelling With Music (2016),The Legendary Weaver: New Edition (2003 and 2011), and The Goshen Principle: A Shelter in the Time of Storm (2010). Her creative works extend beyond books, with poems, short stories, and plays to her credit. In 2008, her short play, 'Legal Stuff', won the BBC and Royal Court Theatre '24 Degrees' Writing Competition.

Her dedication to storytelling also extends to her role in developing a collection of fables for KidsOut World Stories, a project that won the 2013 Talk Talk Digital Heroes award for the East of England. Her contributions to children's literature are equally significant, particularly as a translator. Abimbola has translated several classic children's stories, including: 'Hansel and Gretel', 'The Little Red Hen and the Grain of Wheat' and several other books, published by Mantra Lingua publishers.

Abimbola’s teaching career began at the Institute of Education, University of Plymouth, where she was a tutor from 2003 to 2007. In 2007, she was appointed as a lecturer in creative writing at the University of St Mark & St John (MARJON), Plymouth, where she taught for 11 years. During this time, she received the prestigious Mayflower Scholarship in 2017, which supported her ongoing research into the efficacy of psychosocial interventions in dementia care.

Abimbola’s research interests and passion for dementia care culminated in the creation of the "StoryWeavers for Dementia" program. From 2016 to 2023, she served as a visiting lecturer at the Peninsula School of Medicine and Dentistry, Plymouth, where she led a Special Study Unit (SSU) in Medical Humanities. This innovative program explores non-pharmacological approaches to dementia care, offering support to individuals living with various forms of dementia.

In 2015, in collaboration with the Alzheimer’s Society, Abimbola led a 12-week project in Plymouth’s memory cafes, resulting in the anthology ‘Narrative Adventures from Plymouth Memory Cafes’. Abimbola’s efforts to bridge the gap between psychosocial interventions and dementia care earned her further recognition in 2014, when Stoke Damerel College, which participated in her StoryWeavers program, won the Prime Minister's Dementia Friendly Award in the Schools Category.

A regular guest on BBC Radio Devon, Abimbola continues to share her expertise and experiences in dementia care, creative writing, and storytelling, making significant contributions to both the academic and healthcare communities.

== Awards ==
- 2022, Winner The Box Plymouth After Dark Project.
- 2005, BBC 'Breeze' bursary award.
- 2008, Royal Court Theatre '24 Degrees' Writing Competition.

== Live performances ==
Abimbola is a speaker at literary events. She also performs Storytelling, Radio Musicals and Poetry on stage. Her audience includes children, young adults and adults.

== Bibliography ==
=== Fiction and Non-Fiction ===
- Desert Haiku (2023, ISBN 978-1916266827)
- Dear Toriola, Let's Talk About Perimenopause (2019, ISBN 978-0954625580)
- Trickster Tales for Telling (2016, ISBN 9780954625542)
- How to Enhance Your Storytelling With Music (2016, ISBN 9781452003139)
- The Legendary Weaver: New Edition (2011, ISBN 9780954625504)
- The Goshen Principle: A Shelter in the Time of Storm (2010, ISBN 9781452003139)
- World Stories (2011)
- The Legendary Weaver (2003, ISBN 9780954625504)

== Translations ==
- Hansel and Gretel: "Hansel ati Gretel" Dual Language Yoruba translation by Abimbola Alao. (2005) Mantra Lingua.
- The little Red Hen and the Grains of Wheat: Adie Pupa Kekere ati Eso Alikama' Dual Language Yoruba translation by Abimbola Alao. (2005) Mantra Lingua.
- Floppy's Friends: "Awon ore e Floppy" Dual Language Yoruba translation by Abimbola Alao. (2004) Mantra Lingua.
- Nita Goes to Hospital: 'Nita lo si ile iwosan' Dual Language Yoruba translation by Abimbola Alao. (2005) Mantra Lingua.
- Grandma's Saturday Soup: 'Obe Ojo Abameta Mama Agba' Dual Language Yoruba translation by Abimbola Alao. (2005) Mantra Lingua.
- Welcome to the world baby: 'Kaabo sinu aye Omo titun' Dual Language Yoruba translation by Abimbola Alao. (2005) Mantra Lingua.
- My Talking Dictionary & Interactive CD ROM Yoruba & English – Yoruba translation by Abimbola Alao. (2005) Mantra Lingua.
