= Ayankola Ayanwuyi =

Nigerian author

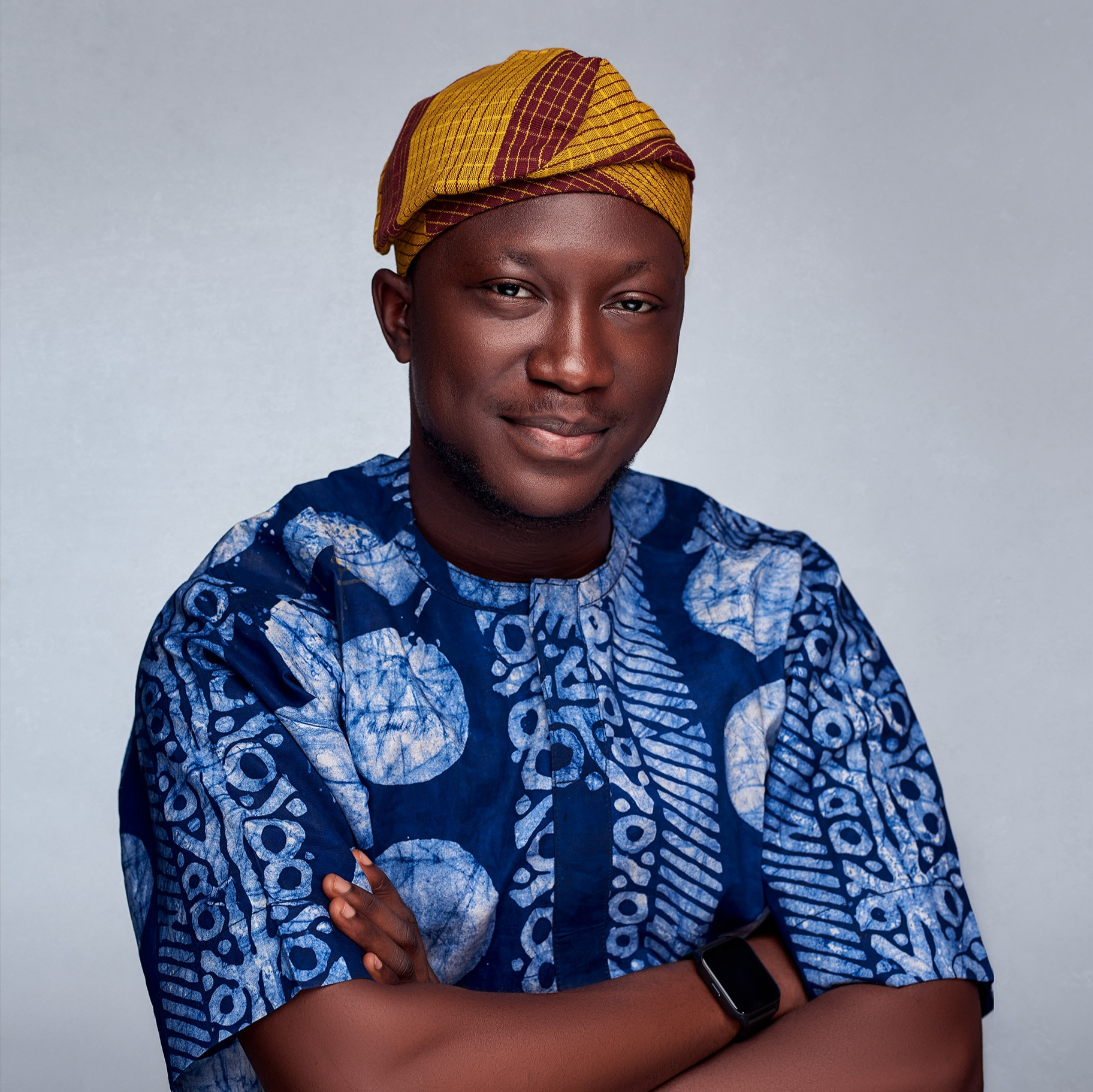
- Ayankola Ayanwuyi
- Citizenship: Nigeria
- Occupation: Author
- Writing career
- Language: Yoruba
- Period: 2023
- Notable work: Esu Is Not Satan

Ayankola Ayanwuyi is a Nigerian documentary filmmaker, author, cultural heritage expert and Ifa scholar known for his work on Yoruba indigenous system and oral traditions. He is the author of Esu Is Not Satan and founder of Dundun Centre. He is among the 40 selected delegates invited to the International Forum organised by United Nations Educational, Scientific and Cultural Organization

== Notable works ==
- The Throne of Alaafin Oyo
- Esu is Not Satan
- Space Sitting Prowess of Egungun Ajomogbodo
