= Adetoye Oyetola Sode =

Nigerian military governor

Military Administrator of Oyo State
- In office 9 December 1993 – 14 September 1994
- Preceded by: Kolapo Olawuyi Ishola
- Succeeded by: Chinyere Ike Nwosu

Adetoye Oyetola Sode is a retired Rear Admiral of the Nigerian Navy and the Military Administrator of Oyo State, Nigeria from December 1993 to September 1994 during the military regime of General Sani Abacha.

Sode gained a degree in Mechanical Engineering from Ahmadu Bello University, Zaria. He became a member of the Nigeria Society of Engineers, and worked in the Federal Ministry of Mines and Power before enlisting in the Nigerian Navy. He attended the Royal Naval Engineering College, Manadon, Plymouth, England for a course in Marine Engineering, then served as Engineering Officer in various naval vessels and also commanded the Naval Shipyard in Port Harcourt.

Navy Captain Adetoye Sode was posted to Oyo State as Military Administrator on 9 December 1993. He was criticized for not including enough Muslims in his cabinet and for allowing Christian religious activity in schools. Sode responded by imposing a statewide ban on religious activities, precipitating a minor crisis.

Sode was awarded the Commander of the Order of the Niger (CON) in 1998. He became Commander of the Fleet Maintenance Corps before his retirement in June 1999. After retiring from active service Sode established a Marine Engineering Consultancy company, Sabita Nigeria. He was appointed to the board of directors of other companies including Intercontinental Engineering & Homes Development (construction and real estate development), ScanHomes Nigeria (construction), Lottoj Oil and Gas (marine fuel logistics and petroleum products) and Eterna Plc (petroleum products manufacturing and distribution).
