= Zaka Alao =

French basketball player (born 1981)

- Born: Zaka Alao; August 15, 1981 (age 44); Paris, France
- Occupation: Basketball player
- Notable work: Played 29 games for French Pro A league club Limoges during the 2003-2004 season.

Zaka Alao (born August 15, 1981 in Paris) is a French basketball player who played 29 games for French Pro A club Limoges during the 2003–04 season.
