= Hussaini Akwanga =

Nigerian politician (1944–2021)

- Born: 3 March 1944
- Died: 17 December 2021 (77 yrs)
- Occupation: Politician
- Notable work: Served as Minister of Labour and Productivity during 2003

Hussaini Akwanga (3 March 1944 – 17 December 2021) was a Nigerian politician who served as Minister of Labour and Productivity during 2003.

== Death ==
He died on 17 December 2021, at the age of 77.
