= Kolapo Ishola =

Nigerian politician (1934–2011)

Governor of Oyo State
- In office 2 January 1992 – 17 November 1993
- Deputy: Ahmed Gbadamosi
- Preceded by: Abdulkareem Adisa
- Succeeded by: Adetoye Oyetola Sode

Personal details
- Born: Kolapo Olawuyi Ishola; 6 June 1934
- Died: 9 August 2011 (aged 77) Ibadan, Nigeria
- Party: Social Democratic Party (1991–1993)
- Spouse: Grace Ishola
- Occupation: Politician

Chief Kolapo Olawuyi Ishola (6 June 1934 – 9 August 2011) was a Nigerian politician who served as the governor of Oyo State from 1992 to 1993, under the platform of the Social Democratic Party (SDP) during the Nigerian Third Republic.

Ishola started work as a Survey Assistant in the Ministry of Lands, (1956–1959), then as Building Inspector with the Ibadan Municipal Government (1959–1960). He also worked as Land Surveyor with the Federal government. He studied in London and became an associate of the Royal Institution of Chartered Surveyors. In 1969 he was awarded the Nigerian Surveyors Licence Certificate.

Ishola was elected on the Social Democratic Party (SDP) platform as Governor of Oyo State in December 1991, taking office on 2 January 1992. On 3 September 1992 Ishola formally established the Oyo state post-primary schools teaching service commission. He founded the School of Science in the year 1992 which is now one of the best science school in Nigeria, Pade, which was abandoned by the subsequent military government. Ishola left office on 17 November 1993 when General Sani Abacha assumed power.

Kolapo Olawuyi Ishola died in his sleep in the early hours of Tuesday, 9 August 2011 in Ibadan, South West Nigeria, aged 77. the Kolapo Ishola estate was named after him because it was a land he did a survey for and the government used the honor to name it after him
