= Bola Ige =

Nigerian politician (1930–2001)

Chief Bola Ige SAN

Minister of Justice
- In office 3 January 2000 – 23 December 2001
- President: Olusegun Obasanjo
- Preceded by: Kanu Godwin Agabi
- Succeeded by: Kanu Godwin Agabi

Minister of Power and Steel
- In office 29 May 1999 – 3 January 2000
- President: Olusegun Obasanjo
- Preceded by: Bello Suleiman
- Succeeded by: Liyel Imoke

Governor of Oyo State
- In office 1 October 1979 – 1 October 1983
- Deputy: Sunday Afolabi (1979–1982); Bisi Akande (1982–1983)
- Preceded by: Paul C. Tarfa
- Succeeded by: Victor Olunloyo

Federal Commissioner for Agriculture
- In office 3 January 1967 – 23 December 1970
- Head of State: Yakubu Gowon
- Preceded by: ministry established
- Succeeded by: Unknown

Personal details
- Born: James Ajibola Idowu Adegoke Ige; 13 September 1930 Esa Oke, Southern Region, British Nigeria (now in Osun State, Nigeria)
- Died: 23 December 2001 (aged 71) Ibadan, Nigeria
- Cause of death: Assassination by gunshot
- Party: Action Group; Unity Party of Nigeria; Alliance for Democracy
- Spouse: Atinuke Ige
- Education: Ibadan Grammar School; University of Ibadan; University College London
- Occupation: Politician; lawyer

Chief James Ajibola Idowu Ige SAN (Yoruba: Bọ́lá Ìgè; 13 September 1930 – 23 December 2001), popularly known as Bola Ige, was a Nigerian lawyer and politician. He served as Federal Minister of Justice of Nigeria from January 2000 until his assassination in December 2001. He had previously served as governor of Oyo State from 1979 to 1983 during the Nigerian Second Republic.

== Background ==
James Ajibola Idowu Adegoke Ige was born in Esa Oke, Osun State in the South Western part of Nigeria on 13 September 1930. His parents were Yoruba natives of Esa-Oke town, in the old Oyo State (now in Osun State).Ige left Kaduna and headed south to the Western region at the age of 14. He studied at Ibadan Grammar School (1943–48), and then at the University of Ibadan. From there, he went to the University College London, where he graduated with a law degree in 1959. He was called to the bar in London's Inner Temple in 1961.

Ige established Bola Ige & Co in 1961, and later became a Senior Advocate of Nigeria.

He became well known in the country for his oratory prowess, as well as his advocacy work on civil rights and democracy. Ige's faith was Christianity. Uncommonly, Ige spoke all the three major Nigerian languages, Yoruba, Igbo and Hausa fluently. He wrote several books, and an anthology of articles and tributes about him was published shortly after his death.

== Early political career ==
During the First Republic (1963–66), at the age of 31 he was at the centre of the Action Group crisis, when Chief Obafemi Awolowo was pitted against his deputy, Chief Samuel Ladoke Akintola. He became a rival of Olusola Olaosebikan for succession to Obafemi Awolowo. Ige was a Commissioner for Agriculture in the now-defunct Western Region of Nigeria (1967–70) under the military government of General Yakubu Gowon. In 1967, he became a friend of Olusegun Obasanjo, who was a commander of the army brigade in Ibadan.

In the early 1970s, during the first period of military rule, he devoted his time to the anti-racism campaign of the World Council of Churches.

Towards the end of the 1970s he joined the Unity Party of Nigeria (UPN), the successor to the Action Group. When General Olusegun Obasanjo initiated the Second Republic, he was elected as governor of Oyo State from October 1979 to October 1983. Adebisi Akande, later to be governor of Osun State after it was split off from Oyo State, was his deputy governor during this period. In the 1983 elections, when he ran for re-election as the UPN candidate, he was defeated by Dr. Victor Omololu Olunloyo. Ige unsuccessfully challenged the election in court. However, Olunloyo lost the seat three months later to a coup staged by Generals Muhammadu Buhari and Tunde Idiagbon.

Ige was detained after the coup, accused of enriching himself with party funds. He was released in 1985, after the next coup, by Ibrahim Babangida, and returned to his legal practice and to writing. In 1990, he published People, Politics And Politicians of Nigeria: 1940–1979, a book that he had begun while imprisoned. He was one of the founders of the influential Yoruba pressure group, Afenifere. Although critical of the military rule of General Sani Abacha, Ige avoided political difficulties during this period.

== Fourth Republic ==
Following the restoration of democracy in 1999, Ige sought the nomination of the Alliance for Democracy party as a presidential candidate, but was rejected. President Obasanjo appointed Ige as minister of Mines and Power (1999–2000). He was not able to make significant improvements to service provided by the monopolistic National Electric Power Authority (NEPA).

He then became Minister of Justice and Attorney General of the Federal Republic of Nigeria (2000–2001). In September 2001, Ige said that the Federal government had initiated a program to re-arrange and consolidate the laws of the Federation, publish them in digital form, and make them available on the website of his ministry. He campaigned ardently against the imposition of the Sharia law in the northern states of Nigeria. In November 2001, he said that the Federal government would not allow the Sokoto State government to execute the judgement of a verdict passed by a Gwadabawa sharia court to stone a woman, Safiya Hussaini to death for committing adultery.

== Death ==
On 23 December 2001, Ige was shot dead at his home in the south-western city of Ibadan. He had been entangled in squabbles within his party in Osun State. The previous week, the long-running feud between Osun state Governor Bisi Akande and his deputy, Iyiola Omisore, had apparently contributed to the death of an Osun State legislator, Odunayo Olagbaju. The government of President Olusegun Obasanjo deployed troops in south-western Nigeria to try to prevent a violent reaction to the murder. Although various people were arrested and tried for involvement in the murder, including Iyiola Omisore, all were acquitted. As of November 2010 the killers had not been found. He was buried in his home town in Esa-Oke, Osun State. In a speech at his funeral, he was quoted as having said that he was sure that Nigeria was worth living for but he was not so sure that it was worth dying for.

== Books ==
- Golden Quotes: a selection of my favourite inspirational quotations. Ibadan : Pocket Gifts; Oxford : African Books Collective [distributor], c2000. x, 163 pp.; 19 cm. ISBN 978-129-496-5
- Detainee's Diary Ibadan : NPS Educational, 1992. 262 p.; 23 cm. ISBN 978-2556-45-9
- People, Politics And Politicians of Nigeria: 1940–1979. Heinemann Educational Books. 1994. ISBN 978-129-496-5.
- Constitutions and the problem of Nigeria Lagos: Nigerian Institute of Advanced Legal Studies, 1995. 36 pp.; 21 cm. ISBN 978-2353-43-4
- Kaduna Boy. NPS Educational. 1991. ISBN 978-2556-35-1.

== See also ==
- List of unsolved murders (2000–present)
