= Adebayo Alao-Akala =

Nigerian politician and police officer (1950–2022)

Governor of Oyo State
- In office 29 May 2007 – 29 May 2011
- Deputy: Taofeek Arapaja
- Preceded by: Rashidi Ladoja
- Succeeded by: Abiola Ajimobi
- In office 12 January 2006 – 7 December 2006
- Deputy: Hazeem Gbolarumi
- Preceded by: Rashidi Ladoja
- Succeeded by: Rashidi Ladoja

Deputy Governor of Oyo State
- In office 7 December 2006 – 29 May 2007
- Governor: Rashidi Ladoja
- Preceded by: Hazeem Gbolarumi
- Succeeded by: Taofeek Arapaja
- In office 29 May 2003 – 12 January 2006
- Governor: Rashidi Ladoja
- Preceded by: Iyiola Oladokun
- Succeeded by: Hazeem Gbolarumi

Personal details
- Born: Christopher Adebayo Alao-Akala; 3 June 1950 Ogbomoso, Southern Region, British Nigeria (now in Oyo State, Nigeria)
- Died: 12 January 2022 (aged 71) Ogbomoso, Nigeria
- Party: Peoples Democratic Party (1998–2014); Labour Party (2014–2017); All Progressive Congress (2017–2018; 2019–2022); Action Democratic Party (2018–2019)
- Spouse: Kemi Alao Akala
- Children: 7, including Olamijuwonlo
- Education: Lead City University; University of Ibadan
- Occupation: Politician; police officer

Christopher Adebayo Alao-Akala // (3 June 1950 – 12 January 2022) was a Nigerian politician and police officer who served as the governor of Oyo State in 2006, and again from 2007 to 2011. He was the candidate of the Action Democratic Party in the 2019 Oyo State gubernatorial election.

Alao-Akala previously served as deputy governor of Oyo State from May 2003 to January 2006 succeeding Rashidi Ladoja when he was impeached, but later reverting to the office when Ladoja was reinstated in December 2006. He was elected governor in 2007, and lost reelection in 2011 to Abiola Ajimobi of the Action Congress of Nigeria.

== Early years ==
Born on 3 June 1950 at Ogbomoso, in the Ogbomoso North Local Government Area of Oyo State, Alao-Akala had his elementary school at Osupa Baptist Day School, Ogbomoso. Alao-Akala proceeded to the Kamina Barracks Middle School, 5th Battalion of Infantry in Tamale, Ghana. He passed Staff College (Psc) 1990, Diploma in Business Administration (1998), Doctor of Civil Law (DCL) Honoris Causa, LAUTECH, Ogbomoso (2006), Doctor of Science (Political Science) Honoris Causa, Lead City University, Ibadan (2008).

Alao-Akala was enlisted as Cadet Inspector of Police in June 1974, at the Nigeria Police College, Ikeja. He was recommended for overseas training at the Hendon Police College, in London. He has also attended the Administrative Staff College, Topo, Badagry; the Nigeria Institute of International Affairs (NIIA), Victoria Island, Lagos; Police Staff College, Jos; Command and Staff College, Jaji. Otunba Alao-Akala has participated as a Nigerian delegate at two INTERPOL conferences in Nice, France and in Málaga, Spain.

== Police career ==
From the position of Station Officer in the Nigeria Police, he became the Administrative Officer, Federal Operations at the Force Headquarters, Lagos. He later rose to the position of Operations Officer, FEDOPS, Lagos. He became the Personal Assistant to the Assistant Inspector-General of Police and subsequently the ADC to the Inspector-General of Police.

Alao-Akala held several command positions in the Police Force. He was O/C Advanced Training Wing, Police College, Ikeja; Divisional Police Officer, Bode Thomas, Lagos; Divisional Police Officer, Iponri Police Station, Lagos; Railway Divisional Police Officer, Nigeria Railways, Ebutte Meta, Lagos; Area Commander, Western District, Nigeria Railway Police, Ibadan; CSP Admin. Gongola State Command, Yola; CSP Admin. Kwara State Command, Ilorin; Assistant Commissioner of Police, Agodi Area Command, Ibadan, Oyo State Police Command, Ibadan. In September 1995, Otunba (Dr) Adebayo retired from the Nigeria Police as the Assistant Commissioner of Police in charge of Logistics and Supply, Oyo State Police Command, Eleyele, Ibadan. Besides public service, Dr. Alao-Akala was a businessman. He was the founder and chairman of TDB Global Ventures and Parrot FM radio station, both in Ogbomoso, Oyo State.

== Political life ==
Otunba (Dr) Adebayo Alao-Akala started his political career as a member of New Dimension. He participated in the zero-party local government election of 1996 and later co-founded the UNP before its fusion with UNC to form UNCP. He participated in the Ogbomoso Federal Constituency (One) primary election of the UNCP in 1997. He contested and won the chairmanship seat of the Ogbomoso North Local Government along with seven councilors under the platform of APP in 1998. He was elected the vice-chairman of ALGON, Oyo State Chapter between 1999 and 2002. Alao-Akala founded the Ogbomoso Unity Forum, a political association which later joined the PDP. He was the Chairman of Ogbomoso North Local Government from 1999 to 2002.

Alao-Akala served as the Deputy Governor of Oyo State from May 2003 to January 2006. Following the impeachment of then incumbent Governor Rashidi Ladoja, Alao-Akala was sworn into office in January 2006 and served for 11 months. In December 2006, the impeachment was overturned by the Supreme Court and Rashidi Ladoja was reinstated. Alao-Akala contested and won the gubernatorial election in 2007 under the platform of the People's Democratic Party (PDP) and became the Executive Governor of Oyo state, serving a full term till May 2011.

On 8 December 2014, Otunba (Dr) Adebayo Alao-Akala defected to the Labour Party in Oyo State from the People's Democratic Party (PDP). On 10 December 2014, he formally declared his intention to re-contest the gubernatorial election of Oyo State on the platform of the Labour Party in the February 2015 general elections in Nigeria. During his declaration of intent, all other party gubernatorial aspirants stepped down for him, thereby making him emerge as the Labour party's gubernatorial flag bearer in Oyo State. On 16 December 2017, he defected to the ruling All Progressives Congress (APC) in a huge ceremony in Ibadan, the capital city of Oyo State.

In October 2018, Alao-Akala defected to the Action Democratic Party (ADP) where he won the gubernatorial ticket to contest the office of Governor of Oyo state in the 2019 general elections (alongside Prof. Abideen Olaiya as Deputy Governor candidate). After 23 February 2019 Presidential and National Assemblies Elections, Akala defected back to the All Progressive Congress, thereby stepping down in the race to become Governor of Oyo state under the Platform of the Action Democratic Party.

== Personal life and death ==
Alao-Akala was a polyglot who spoke English, Yoruba, Hausa and Ghanaian languages (Tiv, Fanti and Dagbani) fluently. He had seven children, and died on 12 January 2022, at the age of 71.
