= Ogbomosho North =

- LGA
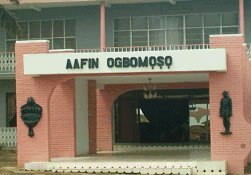
- Ogbomosho palace
- Interactive map of Ogbomosho North
- Country: Nigeria
- State: Oyo State
- Headquarter: Kinnira

Government
  - Local Government Chairman and the Head of the Local Government Council: George Ogunlade (PDP)

Area
  - Total: 235 km^{2} (91 sq mi)
- Time zone: UTC+1 (WAT)
- Postal code: 210001
- Website: ogbomosonorth.oyostate.gov.ng

Ogbomosho North is a Local Government Area in Oyo State, Nigeria. Its headquarter is located in Kinnira and is headed by the chairman, George Ogunlade.

== History ==
Ogbomoso North Local Government Area was established on 27 September 1991, created from the former Ogbomoso Local Government Area, which had originally been established on 1 April 1973.

== Geography ==
Ogbomoso North Local Government Area spans approximately 235 km^{2}, with an average temperature of 28 °C (82 °F). The annual precipitation in the area is around 1,830 mm (72 in), and the average wind speed is recorded at 9 km/h (5.6 mph).

Ogbomoso North is the most populous local government in the city, serving as its major economic hub. It had the highest population among the local government areas in the city as of the 2006 census.

Yoruba language is widely spoken in the Local Government Area, and Christianity and Islam are the predominant religions in the region.

== Economy ==
Ogbomoso North Local Government Area accommodates numerous banks, hotels, restaurants, industries, schools, both private and government owned. The Local Government Area boasts a thriving trade sector and hosts several markets, including Wazo, Ayanyan and Jagun markets, where a wide variety of commodities are traded.

== Education and healthcare ==
The local government is home to one of Nigeria's most prestigious institutions of higher learning, Ladoke Akintola University of Technology (LAUTECH), and its teaching hospital. The Nigerian Baptist Medical Centre and Bowen University Teaching Hospital are also situated in the region. These institutions contribute significantly to the region’s educational and healthcare development.

== Places of interest ==
The Soun Palace is the official residence of the traditional ruler of Ogbomoso.

== Notable people ==
Ogbomoso North Local Government has a rich history shaped by the achievements of its sons and daughters. These individuals, both past and present, have made significant contributions to the nation's progress across diverse fields such as politics, economics, security, and education, leaving a lasting legacy on the national landscape. Notable people from the area include:

- Christopher Adebayo Alao-Akala, former governor of Oyo State
- Samuel Ladoke Akintola, former premier of the Western Region
- Colonel Ibrahim Taiwo, former military governor of Kwara State
- Brigadier-General Benjamin Adekunle, a war veteran nicknamed "The Black Scorpion"
- Sunday Adewusi, retired Inspector General of Police.

== Post office code ==
The postal code of the area is 210.
