= Oladayo Popoola =

Nigerian politician and general

Major General Oladayo Popoola

Military Governor of Oyo State
- In office January 1984 – August 1985
- Preceded by: Dr. Victor Omololu Olunloyo
- Succeeded by: Colonel Adetunji Idowu Olurin

Military Governor of Ogun State
- In office August 1985 – 1986
- Preceded by: Oladipo Diya
- Succeeded by: Raji Alagbe Rasaki

Personal details
- Born: 26 February 1944 (age 82)

Military service
- Allegiance: Nigeria
- Branch/service: Nigerian Army
- Rank: Major General

Oladayo Popoola (Yoruba: Oládayọ̀ Pópóọlá; born 26 February 1944) is a Nigerian retired major-general who was military governor of Oyo State (January 1984 – August 1985) during the military regime of Major-General Muhammadu Buhari, He was then appointed Military Governor of Ogun State (August 1985 – 1986) during the military regime of General Ibrahim Babangida.

== Biography ==
Oladayo Popoola was born on 26 February 1944. He completed his secondary education in Ikire, Osun State. He joined the army and moved up steadily through the ranks, becoming deputy defense adviser at the Nigerian High Commission, India, director at the Staff College, Jaji, and Chief of Administration and Chief of Logistics Army Headquarters. He was appointed military governor of Oyo State in January 1984 and governor of Ogun State in August 1985. He was a member of the Provisional Ruling Council.

Nigeria and Cameroon disputed ownership of the Bakassi Peninsula, thought to hold major oil reserves, with sporadic fighting starting in 1994. In November 1998, Nigeria and Cameroon exchanged prisoners of war. As commander of Nigerian forces in the region (82 Mechanised Division, Enugu), General Oladayo Popoola said the exchange was made in the "spirit of reconciliation in our countries".

While in the army, Popoola studied law at the University of Lagos as a part-time student, obtaining an LL.B. degree. Later he attended the Nigerian Law School, Lagos and became a Barrister at Law. In March 1999, he was chair of the Presidential Committee on Development Options for the Niger Delta, which recommended increased funds for infrastructural development and establishment of a Niger Delta Consultative Council. Popoola voluntarily retired from the army at the start of the Nigerian Fourth Republic, unlike other former military governors and administrators that were compulsorily retired from service. In 2004, he was working as managing director of Daybis Printing Press, a company in Ibadan.
