= Lam Adesina =

Nigerian politician and educator (1939–2012)

Lam Adesina CON

Governor of Oyo State
- In office 29 May 1999 – 29 May 2003
- Deputy: Iyiola Oladokun
- Preceded by: Amen Edore Oyakhire
- Succeeded by: Rasheed Ladoja

Personal details
- Born: Lamidi Ona-Olapo Adesina; 20 January 1939 Ibadan, Southern Region, British Nigeria (now in Oyo State, Nigeria)
- Died: 11 November 2012 (aged 73) Lagos Island, Lagos, Nigeria
- Party: Unity Party of Nigeria (1979–1983); Alliance for Democracy (1998–2006); Action Congress of Nigeria (2006–2012)
- Spouse: Saratu Lam Adesina
- Children: Dapo; Ayobami
- Education: Loyola College, Ibadan; University of Nigeria; University of Ibadan
- Occupation: Politician; educator

Lamidi Ona-Olapo Adesina CON (20 January 1939 – 11 November 2012) was a Nigerian educator and politician who served as the governor of Oyo State from 1999 to 2003, as a member of the Alliance for Democracy (AD) party.

== Early life ==
Adesina was born on 20 January 1939. He attended Loyola College, Ibadan. then studied at the University of Nigeria, Nsukka from 1961 to 1965 and obtained a BA (Hons) in history. Later he attended the University of Ibadan in 1971 and obtained a PGDE.

== Career ==
Lam Adesina was an educator. He was a teacher at Lagelu Grammar School Ibadan, where he taught history, English and Literature. Among his students at the school was Abiola Ajimobi, who would later become the governor of Oyo State. He rose through the ranks and assume the role of school administrator (principal). Lam later worked in private educational institutions and established a bookshop before entering politics. Lam Adesina was also a popular newspaper columnist. His writings under the "search continues column" in the Nigerian Tribune were uncomfortable for successive military regimes and he was detained several times.

== Political life ==
Lam Adesina was elected to the federal house of representative for Ibadan south 1 constituency in 1979 under the platform of the Unity Party of Nigeria established by the late chief Obafemi Awolowo. He returned to private business after the military took over in 1983. Lam was elected to the constituent assembly in 1988. Lam Adesina was a leader of the National Democratic Coalition popularly known as NADECO in Oyo State, Nigeria. The coalition was formed to bring an end to the military government of Sani Abacha and the regime to honour the electoral mandate given to MKO Abiola who won the presidential elections and was later detained In 1998, Lam Adesina was arrested by the military government of Abacha along with other activists, imprisoned and tagged a "prisoner of war".

== Later career ==
Lam Adesina was a sponsor of Abiola Ajimobi in his bid to be elected to the senate for Oyo South in 2003. Later the two men fell apart, and Ajimobi moved to the All Nigeria Peoples Party (ANPP), but in October 2009, Ajimobi returned to the Action Congress of Nigeria under the leadership of Lam Adesina in Oyo State the two were reconciled. Lam Adesina supported Ajimobi and campaigned for his election as the governor of Oyo state under the Platform of the Action Congress of Nigeria in 2011.

== Death ==
Lam Adesina died on 11 November 2012 at the private St. Nicholas Hospital on Lagos Island. It was thought that the cause was related to diabetes, from which he had suffered for some time.

He was buried at his Felele residence according to Islamic rites.
