= Adewolu Ladoja =

Nigerian monarch (born 1944)

- Olubadan of Ibadan
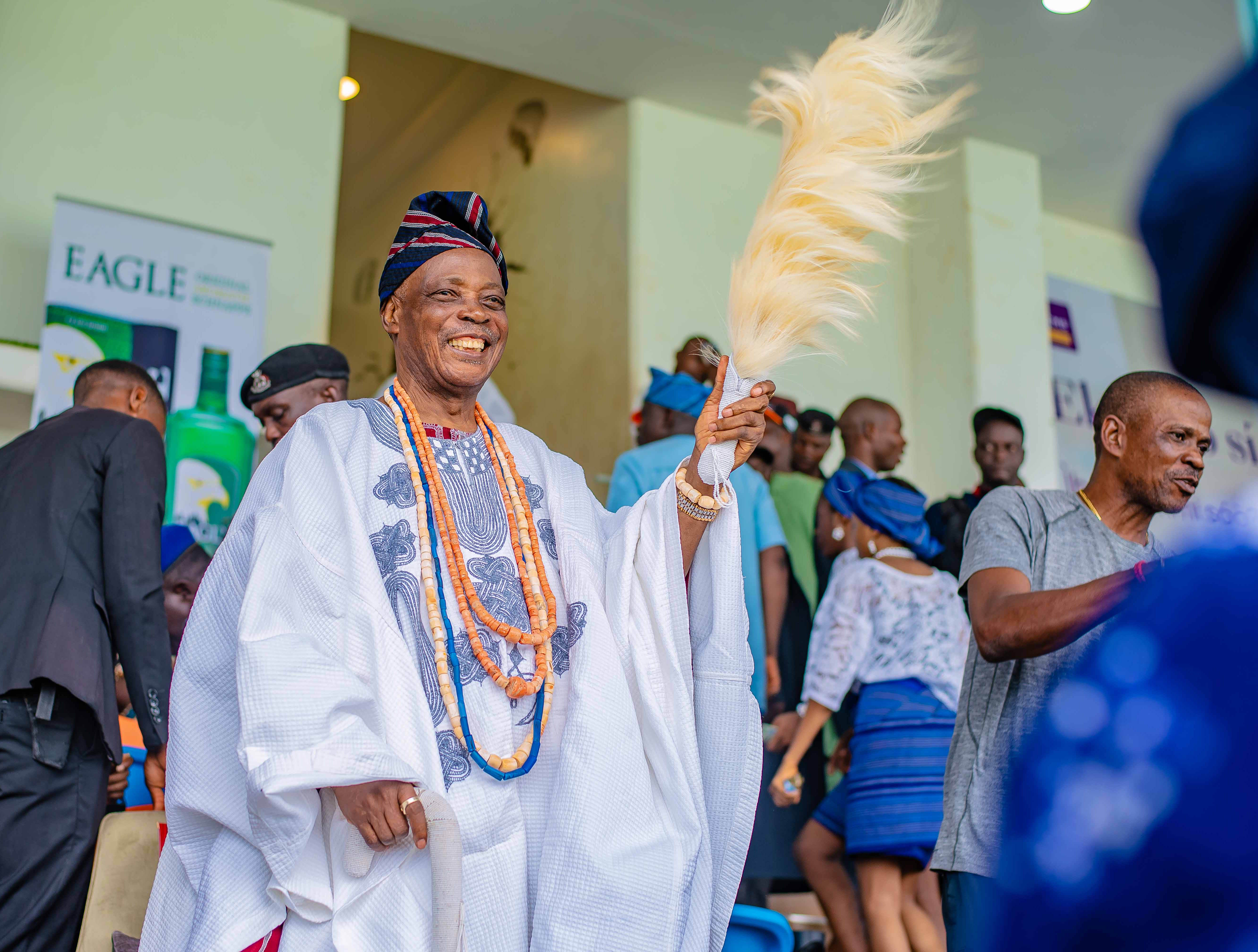

44th Olubadan of Ibadan
- Reign: 26 September 2025 – present
- Coronation: 26 September 2025
- Predecessor: Owolabi Olakulehin

Governor of Oyo State
- In office 7 December 2006 – 29 May 2007
- Deputy: Adebayo Alao-Akala
- Preceded by: Adebayo Alao-Akala
- Succeeded by: Adebayo Alao-Akala
- In office 29 May 2003 – 12 January 2006
- Deputy: Adebayo Alao-Akala
- Preceded by: Lam Adesina
- Succeeded by: Adebayo Alao-Akala

Senator for Oyo South
- In office 5 December 1992 – 17 November 1993
- Succeeded by: Peter Olawuyi Adeyemo (1999)
- Born: Rashidi Adewolu Ladoja; 25 September 1944 (age 82); Gambari, Ibadan, Southern Region, British Nigeria (now in Oyo State, Nigeria)
- Spouse: Olayinka Mutiat Ladoja
Regnal name
- Arusa I
- House: Otun
- Religion: Ìṣẹ̀ṣe; Islam
- Occupation: Politician; Businessman
- Education: Olivet Baptist High School; University of Liège
- Political party: Zenith Labour Party (2018–2025)
- Other political affiliations: Social Democratic Party (1992–1993); Peoples Democratic Party (1998–2010; 2017–2018); Accord Party (2010–2017); African Democratic Congress (2018)

Oba Adewolu Ladoja (born 25 September 1944) is a Nigerian monarch. He is the 44th Olubadan of Ibadan.

Before ascending the throne, Ladoja was a chief and politician who served as the governor of Oyo State from 2003 to 2006; and from 2006 to 2007; and as Senator representing Oyo South from 1992 to 1993. In August 2025, he was officially approved as the 44th Olubadan-designate by the Oyo State Governor, Seyi Makinde. His formal coronation ceremony took place on 26 September 2025, a day after his 81st birthday.

== Early life ==
Ladoja was born on 25 September 1944 in Gambari village near Ibadan. He attended Ibadan Boys High School (1958–1963) and Olivet Baptist High School (1964–1965). He studied at the University of Liège, Belgium (1966–1972) where he earned a degree in chemical engineering. He obtained a job with Total Nigeria, an oil company, where he worked for 13 years in various positions before entering private business in 1985. His business interests include shipping, manufacturing, banking, agriculture and transportation. By 2000, Ladoja had become a director of Standard Trust Bank Limited.

== Senator Representing Oyo State ==
During the short-lived Nigerian Third Republic, he was elected to the Nigerian Senate in 1992 as a member of the Social Democratic Party.

== Governor of Oyo State ==
Ladoja was elected governor of Oyo State in April 2003 on the PDP platform, and took office on 29 May 2003. He was supported by Alhaji Lamidi Adedibu, a PDP power broker in the state. By August 2004, Ladoja and Adedibu were locked in a fierce struggle over allocation of government appointees. Ladoja was not supported by the party in this dispute. In an interview in late 2005, the PDP national chairman, Ahmadu Ali, said that Ladoja should take instructions from Lamidi Adedibu.

On 12 January 2006, Ladoja was impeached by Oyo State legislators and forced out of office. His deputy, Christopher Adebayo Alao-Akala, was sworn in as the new governor. On 1 November 2006, the Appeal Court in the state capital, Ibadan, declared the impeachment null and illegal, but advised waiting for confirmation of this decision by the Supreme Court. The Supreme Court upheld the decision on 11 November 2006, and Ladoja officially resumed office on 12 December 2006. Anti-riot police were deployed along the main roads leading to the main government offices to prevent violence from supporters of Adebayo Alao-Akala and Lamidi Adedibu during his reinstatement.

Ladoja failed to win the PDP nomination as candidate for a second term. He chose to back the Action Congress candidates for 33 local council chairmanship elections. The PDP refused to participate in the elections. As a result, the Action Congress (AC) won 26 seats and the All Nigeria Peoples Party (ANPP) won seven. However, his successor as governor, his former deputy and former acting governor Christopher Adebayo Akala, sacked the council chairmen shortly after taking office and replaced them with PDP supporters.

== Later career ==
On 28 August 2008, Ladoja was arrested by the Economic and Financial Crimes Commission (EFCC) over allegations of non-remittance of the proceeds of sale of government shares totaling N1.9 billion during his administration. He was briefly remanded in prison by the Federal High Court in Lagos on 30 August 2008. He was granted bail on 5 September, in the amount of 100 million naira with two sureties for the same sum. In March 2009, a former aide testified on the way on which the share money had been divided between Ladoja's family, bodyguard, senior politicians and lawyers.

Ladoja was the governorship candidate for Accord party in Oyo State during the April 2011 and 2015 elections, he lost to Senator Abiola Ajimobi. He later merged his Accord Party into PDP in 2017. Dispute in PDP made him and other allies (from Labour Party, All Progressives Congress APC etc.) to move over African Democratic Congress (ADC) in 2018. After a brief sojourn in ADC which proved to be a marriage of strange bedfellows, Ladoja with his followers moved to the Zenith Labour Party (ZLP) in December 2018.

== Oba and Olubadan ==
Ladoja became an Oba after he received a ceremonial beaded crown from reigning Olubadan of Ibadanland and the Government of Oyo State on 12 August 2024.

Following the death of Oba Owolabi Olakulehin, the 43rd Olubadan, the Olubadan-in-council announced Ladoja as the incoming Olubadan on 7 July 2025.

On 21 August 2025, Oyo State Governor, Seyi Makinde, officially approved Ladoja as the 44th Olubadan-designate and slated a formal coronation ceremony for Friday, 26 September 2025 at Mapo Hall in the ancient city.

Historically, Oba Ladoja becomes the first democratically elected former Governor to become a king in the Nigeria traditional and political history.
