= List of governors of Oyo State =

Governors of Oyo state

This is a list of administrators and governors of Oyo State, Nigeria. Oyo State was formed in 1976 when Western State was divided into Ogun, Ondo, and Oyo states.

Name	Title	Took office	Left office	Party	Notes
Col. David Jemibewon	Governor	March 1976	July 1978	Military	
Col. Paul Tarfa	Governor	July 1978	October 1979	Military	
Chief Bola Ige	Executive Governor	1 October 1979	1 October 1983	Unity Party of Nigeria (UPN)	
Dr. Victor Omololu Olunloyo	Executive Governor	1 October 1983	31 December 1983	National Party of Nigeria (NPN)	
Lt. Col. Oladayo Popoola	Governor	4 January 1984	September 1985	Military	
Col. Adetunji Idowu Olurin	Governor	September 1985	July 1988	Military	
Col. Sasaenia Oresanya	Governor	27 July 1988	August 1990	Military	
Col. Abdulkareem Adisa	Governor	3 September 1990	January 1992	Military	
Chief Kolapo Olawuyi Ishola	Executive Governor	2 January 1992	17 November 1993	Social Democratic Party (SDP)	
Navy Capt. Adetoye Oyetola Sode	Administrator	9 December 1993	14 September 1994	Military	
Col. Chinyere Ike Nwosu	Administrator	14 September 1994	22 August 1996	Military	
Col. Ahmed Usman	Administrator	22 August 1996	August 1998	Military	
Comm. Pol. Amen Edore Oyakhire	Administrator	16 August 1998	28 May 1999	Military	
Dr. Lam Adesina	Governor	29 May 1999	28 May 2003	Alliance for Democracy (AD)	
Rashidi Adewolu Ladoja	Governor	29 May 2003	28 May 2007	People's Democratic Party (PDP)	Impeached in January 2006, reinstated in December 2006
Christopher Alao-Akala	Governor (de facto)	12 January 2006	7 December 2006	People's Democratic Party (PDP)	Appointed when Rasheed Ladoja was impeached, until the impeachment was overturned.
Christopher Alao-Akala	Governor	29 May 2007	29 May 2011	People's Democratic Party (PDP)	
Abiola Ajimobi	Governor	29 May 2011	29 May 2019	Action Congress of Nigeria (ACN)	
Seyi Makinde	Governor	29 May 2019	Incumbent	People's Democratic Party (PDP)	

== See also ==
- Nigeria
- States of Nigeria
- List of state governors of Nigeria
