= 2023 Oyo State gubernatorial election =

2023 gubernatorial election in Oyo State, Nigeria

- 18 March 2023
- Registered: 3,276,675
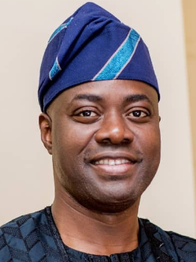

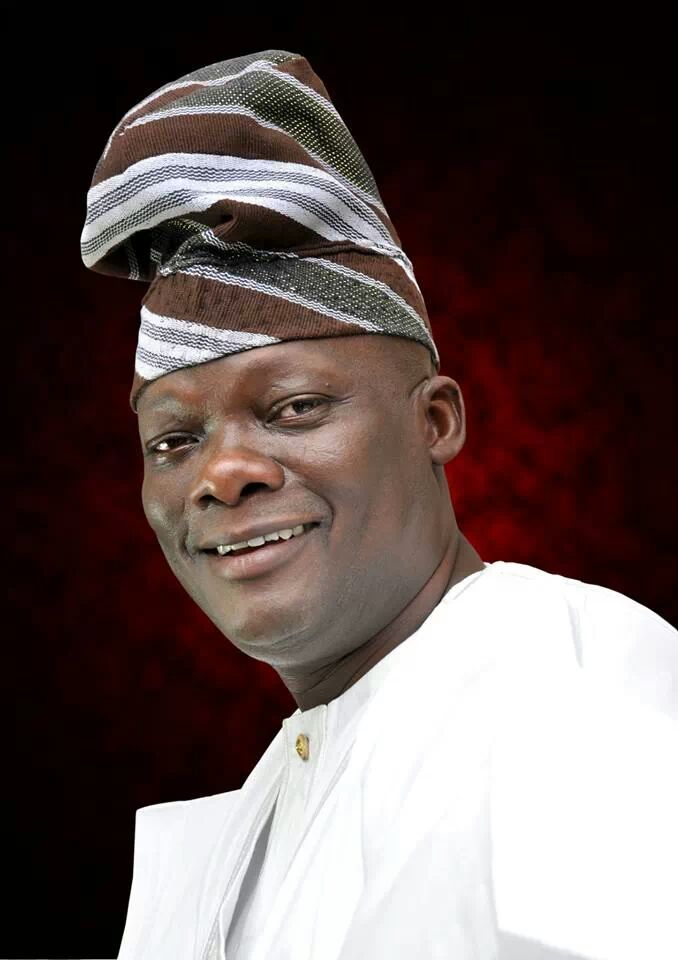

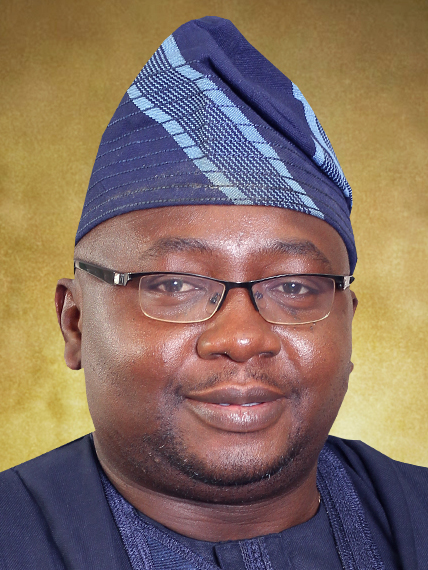
Nominee	Seyi Makinde	Teslim Folarin	Adebayo Adelabu
Party	PDP	APC	A
Running mate	Bayo Lawal	David Oluwafemi Okunlola	Abiodun Ayanfemi Ayandele
Popular vote	563,756	256,685	38,357
Percentage	63.37%	28.86%	4.31%
Governor before election
Seyi Makinde
PDP
Elected Governor
Seyi Makinde
PDP

The 2023 Oyo State gubernatorial election was held on 18 March 2023, to elect the Governor of Oyo State, concurrent with elections to the Oyo State House of Assembly as well as twenty-seven other gubernatorial elections and elections to all other state houses of assembly. The election — which was postponed from its original 11 March date — was held three weeks after the presidential election and National Assembly elections. Incumbent PDP Governor Seyi Makinde was re-elected, winning by a 34.5% margin of victory over first runner-up and APC nominee — Senator Teslim Folarin.

The primaries, scheduled for between 4 April and 9 June 2022, resulted in Makinde being renominated by the Peoples Democratic Party by a wide margin on 25 May while the All Progressives Congress nominated Folarin — Senator for Oyo Central — on 26 May. The next month, Adebayo Adelabu — the runner-up in the APC primary — obtained the Accord nomination.

On 20 March, INEC declared Makinde as the victor as final totals showed him winning nearly 564,000 votes (~63% of the vote) to defeat Folarin with about 266,000 votes (~29% of the vote) and Adelabu, who won around 38,000 votes (~4% of the vote). Later that day, Folarin conceded defeat and congratulated Makinde in a statement.

== Electoral system ==
The Governor of Oyo State is elected using a modified two-round system. To be elected in the first round, a candidate must receive the plurality of the vote and over 25% of the vote in at least two-thirds of state local government areas. If no candidate passes this threshold, a second round will be held between the top candidate and the next candidate to have received a plurality of votes in the highest number of local government areas.

== Background ==
Oyo State is a large, Yoruba-majority southwestern state; the state has vast agricultural and service sectors but it faces large security issues from both inter-ethnic violence and conflict between herders and farmers along with a large number of out-of-school children.

Politically, the 2019 elections in the state were categorized as a large swing towards the PDP as the party's presidential nominee Atiku Abubakar narrowly won the state after Buhari had won it in 2015, Makinde won the gubernatorial race by 17% of the vote, and the PDP gained a majority in the House of Assembly. For the Senate, the APC won back two Senate seats it lost through defections while the PDP gained a APC-held seat; in the House of Representatives, the APC won the majority of the seats.

Ahead of his term, Makinde's inauguration speech focused on ease of doing business, fighting poverty, education, agricultural development, disability rights, and healthcare. In terms of his performance, Makinde was commended for a productive first 100 days, investing heavily in educational development, establishing the Oyo State Anti-Corruption Agency, and confirming that Muslim students could wear hijabs in school. However, he was criticized for poor initial responses to the COVID-19 pandemic and October 2020 End SARS protests along with proposed handing over of Government College, Ibadan to the alumni association.

== Primary elections ==
The primaries, along with any potential challenges to primary results, were to take place between 4 April and 3 June 2022 but the deadline was extended to 9 June.

=== All Progressives Congress ===
Analysts viewed the APC gubernatorial primary as a likely contest between the preexisting major factions within the Oyo State APC, namely: the faction led by Oyo Central Senator Teslim Folarin and the Unity Forum which was backed by most other major state APC politicians including Oyo North Senator Abdulfatai Buhari and 2019 APC nominee Adebayo Adelabu. Tensions between the factions reached a head days before the APC national convention in March 2022 when the Unity Forum held a parallel party congress and elected separate leadership to the Folarin-supported bloc's congress; although the national party ended up accepting the congress by Folarin's faction, tensions continued until an April reconciliation process between Buhari and Folarin which ended in a truce where Buhari dropped out of the gubernatorial race and Folarin supported Buhari's return bid to the senate.

On 20 April 2022, the APC National Executive Committee announced the party's schedule for gubernatorial primaries, setting its expression of interest form price at ₦10 million and nomination form price at ₦40 million with a 50% nomination form discount for candidates younger than 40 while women and candidates with disabilities get free nomination forms. Forms were to be sold from 26 April to 6 May until the deadline was later extended to 10 May then 12 May. After the submission of nomination forms by 13 May, candidates were screened by a party committee on 14 and 15 May while 16 May was the date for the screening appeal process. Ward congresses and LGA congresses were set for between 7 and 9 May to elect delegates for the primary. Candidates approved by the screening process advanced to a primary set for 26 May, in concurrence with other APC gubernatorial primaries; challenges to the result could be made the next day.

Pre-primary analysis said the race was between the groups backing Folarin and Adelabu. Hours before the primary's scheduled start, the primary committee abruptly postponed the election until 27 May due to "an influx of non-delegates into the venue and security reasons." The next day, the candidates contested an indirect primary that ended in a win for Folarin after results showed him gaining just over 73% of the delegates' votes. In his acceptance speech, Folarin vowed to save the state from the "maladministration of the PDP-led government" and thanked delegates. However, the internal party crisis did not end as Adelabu—the first runner-up who did not attend the primary—labeled the primary as a "charade" and left the party for Accord.

==== Nominated ====
- Teslim Folarin: Senator for Oyo Central (2003–2011; 2019–present) and 2015 PDP gubernatorial nominee
  - Running mate—David Oluwafemi Okunlola: lecturer

==== Eliminated in primary ====
- Azeez Adeduntan: former Commissioner of Health
- Adebayo Adelabu: 2019 APC gubernatorial nominee and former CBN Deputy Governor of Operations (2014–2018) (defected after to the primary to run in the Accord gubernatorial primary)
- Akeem Agbaje: barrister
- Adeolu Akande: Chairman of the Nigerian Communications Commission (2020–present) and former Chief of Staff to Governor Abiola Ajimobi
- Oyedele Hakeem Alao: 2019 AD gubernatorial nominee

==== Withdrew ====
- Adeniyi Akintola: former House of Assembly member and husband of state High Court judge Rachael Boyede Akintola
- Abdulfatai Buhari: Senator for Oyo North (2015–present) and former House of Representatives member for Ogbomoso North/Ogbomoso South/Orire (2003–2007) (to run for senator for Oyo North)
- Abisoye Fagade: businessman (to run for senator for Oyo Central)
- Joseph Olasunkanmi Tegbe: 2019 APC gubernatorial candidate (defected to the PDP prior to the primary to run for senator for Oyo Central)

==== Declined ====
- Abdur-Raheem Adebayo Shittu: former Minister of Communications (2015–2019), 2015 and 2019 APC gubernatorial candidate, former Commissioner for Justice and Attorney General, and former House of Assembly member

==== Results ====
Candidates' vote share
1. Teslim Folarin (73.2%)
2. Adebayo Adelabu (25.1%)
3. Other candidates (1.76%)

APC primary results
Party	Candidate	Votes	%
APC	Teslim Folarin	954	73.16%
APC	Adebayo Adelabu	327	25.08%
APC	Akeem Agbaje	15	1.15%
APC	Oyedele Hakeem Alao	6	0.46%
APC	Azeez Adeduntan	2	0.15%
APC	Adeniyi Akintola (withdrawn)	0	0.00%
Total votes		1,304	100.00%
Invalid or blank votes		11	N/A
Turnout		1,315	74.93

=== People's Democratic Party ===
Despite rumors about a potential presidential campaign, Makinde declined to contest for the presidency and instead announced his campaign for re-election to the office of governor; analysts state that he is the prohibitive favorite in the PDP gubernatorial primary. However, the Oyo PDP underwent a series of internal disputes ahead of the election with the most major one being over Makinde's control of the state party and his "consensus" picks for various nominations. Another issue was the break between Makinde and his deputy, Rauf Olaniyan; while Olaniyan ruled out a gubernatorial run in 2020, he lamented being sidelined and openly spoke about defecting to another party by early 2022.

On 16 March 2022, the national PDP announced its gubernatorial primaries' schedule, setting its expression of interest form price at ₦1 million and the nomination form price at ₦20 million with a 50% discount for candidates between 25 and 30. Forms were to be sold until 1 April but the party later extended the deadline four times before reaching a final deadline of 22 April. After the submission of nomination forms by 25 April, candidates were screened by a party committee on 28 April while 2 May was the rescheduled date for the screening appeal process. Ward congresses were set for 29 April and LGA congresses were rescheduled for 10 May to elect delegates for the primary. Candidates approved by the screening process advanced to a primary set for 25 May, in concurrence with all other PDP gubernatorial primaries; challenges to the result could be made in the following days.

Ahead of the primary, observers predicted an easy Makinde victory. On the date of the primary, the exercise held peacefully at Lekan Salami Stadium in Ibadan and ended with Makinde defeating his sole challenger, former Deputy Governor Hazeem Gbolarumi, by a massive margin: 1,040 to 2. Before the primary, Gbolarumi claimed that his supporters were chased from the venue and after the vote, he rejected the results. After the primary, Makinde dropped Olaniyan as his running mate by picking former state Attorney-General Bayo Lawal instead on 7 June; a few days later Olaniyan decamped to the APC. On 18 July, Olaniyan was removed from office by the House of Assembly with Lawal being nominated and confirmed in his place.

==== Nominated ====
- Seyi Makinde: Governor (2019–present) and 2015 SDP gubernatorial nominee
  - Running mate—Bayo Lawal: Deputy Governor (2022–present) and former state Attorney-General

==== Eliminated in primary ====
- Hazeem Gbolarumi: former Deputy Governor (2007–2011)

==== Withdrew ====
- Joshua Olukayode Popoola: engineer (defected prior to the primary to successfully run in the NNPP gubernatorial primary)

==== Declined ====
- Rauf Olaniyan: former Deputy Governor (2019–2022)

==== Results ====
Candidates' vote share
1. Seyi Makinde (99.8%)
2. Hazeem Gbolarumi (0.19%)

PDP primary results
Party	Candidate	Votes	%
PDP	Seyi Makinde	1,040	99.81%
PDP	Hazeem Gbolarumi	2	0.19%
Total votes		1,042	100.00%
Invalid or blank votes		6	N/A
Turnout		1,048	96.50%

=== Minor parties ===
- Adebayo Adelabu (Accord)
  - Running mate: Abiodun Ayanfemi Ayandele
- Lateef Olaniyi Ajekiigbe (Action Alliance)
  - Running mate: Ajiboye Taofeek Fawole
- Akim Adebola Yusuf (Action Democratic Party)
  - Running mate: Adigun Modupe Daniels
- Yinusa Kazeem Ayandoye (Action Peoples Party)
  - Running mate: Christopher Oyeniyi Olanipekun
- Mojeed Okedara (African Action Congress)
  - Running mate: Oladimeji Idowu Ayomide
- Ghaniyu Bamidele Ajadi (African Democratic Congress)
  - Running mate: Emmanuel Oyetayo Oyewole (Note: Although Oyewole defected to the PDP and endorsed Makinde on 21 October 2022, the defection was after the window for nominee substitution and thus he remains on the ballot papers.)
- Adeyemi Oluwaseye Adeniran (Allied Peoples Movement)
  - Running mate: Emmanuel Adekanmi Adewale
- Adeshina Adewole (All Progressives Grand Alliance)
  - Running mate: John Oladejo Oladepo
- Okunade Tunde Adeyemi (Boot Party)
  - Running mate: Haleemat Omobola Adeleke
- Tawfiq Tayo Akinwale (Labour Party)
  - Running mate: Esther Adebimpe Akanji
- Joshua Olukayode Popoola (New Nigeria Peoples Party)
  - Running mate: Modinat Adesope
- Raymond Adegboyega (National Rescue Movement)
  - Running mate: Adetunji Adeyemi Adedimeji
- Michael Lana (Social Democratic Party)
  - Running mate: Abdur-Rahman Aloyinlapa
- Aduragbemi Euba (Young Progressives Party)
  - Running mate: Jeleel Ojewole

== Campaign ==
Immediately after the primaries in June 2022, observers stated that Makinde and Folarin were focusing on unifying their respective parties. PDP members aggrieved by Makinde's allegedly 'exclusionist' leadership style began to be viewed as a potential liability for Makinde by pundits while analysts also noted that Ezenwo Nyesom Wike–an ally of Makinde–losing the PDP presidential primary might lead to less out-of-state internal party support for Makinde's campaign. Another potential problem for Makinde was his attempts to impeach his deputy Rauf Olaniyan for decamping to the APC. Folarin also faced issues with defections as several high-profile party members (including primary runner-up Adebayo Adelabu) switched to Accord or the New Nigeria Peoples Party; in response, the party formed a peace and reconciliation committee. By August and September, the APC reconciliation process had proceeded but the party continued to fear further loss of support, especially from the relatives of late former Governor Abiola Ajimobi as more losing gubernatorial candidates refused to back Folarin; similarly, Makinde's issues with the national PDP continued into the month as well.

Pundits noted that regional unity, not just party unity, would also be required for successful campaigns. Candidates from outside the city of Ibadan, which has produced six of seven elected governors, were passed over for major party nominations as both Folarin and Makinde are from the city. The oft-lamented dominance of Ibadan on Oyo State politics due to its numerical advantage (Note: In the previous three gubernatorial elections, Ibadan voters made up about half of the total electorate; 51% in 2011, 47% in 2015, and 46% in 2019.) sparked resentment; both major parties were expected to select deputy nominees from outside the city to balance their tickets, both major candidates followed the expectation with Makinde picking Kisi-native Bayo Lawal and Folarin selecting Shaki-native David Oluwafemi Okunlola.

Later in 2022, Makinde continued his disputes with the national PDP by aligning with the Wike-led Integrity Group against the party's presidential nominee—Atiku Abubakar. By December, reports that the Integrity Group planned to endorse a different party's presidential nominee purportedly led the PDP to threaten the group with expulsion. Amid the turmoil, analysts noted that the dispute could greatly affect Makinde's re-election chances as Abubakar allies within the Oyo PDP could support Folarin to remove an intra-party rival. However, Folarin continued to face similar internal problems as reporting revealed that former state First Lady Florence Ajimobi was supporting Adebayo Adelabu (A) while several other Oyo APC figures (Minister Sunday Akin Dare, former Minister Abdur-Raheem Adebayo Shittu) did not actively campaign for Folarin. Perhaps most importantly, APC presidential nominee Bola Tinubu also allegedly did not support Folarin by January 2023.

By 2023, attention largely switched to the presidential election on 25 February. In the election, Oyo State voted for Bola Tinubu (APC); Tinubu won 55.6% of the vote to defeat Atiku Abubakar (PDP) at 22.6% and Peter Obi (LP) at 12.2%. Although the result was unsurprising as Oyo is in Tinubu's southwestern base and projections had favored him, the totals led to increased pressure on the Makinde campaign due to Tinubu's wide margin of victory and APC downballot successes. Gubernatorial campaign analysis in the wake of the presidential election noted that Makinde's (alleged) tacit support for Tinubu may inadvertently hurt his own campaign as the move galvanized APC supporters while alienating Abubakar-supporting PDP voters. However, other punditry pointed out intra-APC divides in addition to the resurfacing of Folarin's murder charge from the 2010 NURTW crisis.

== Projections ==
Source	Projection	As of
Africa Elects (Note: AfricaElects projections predict the likelihood of a candidate winning a state by categorizing a state as "Safe" for exceedingly likely, "Likely" for somewhat likely, and "Lean" for least likely. If no clear determination could be made, states are categorized as "tossups".)	Tossup	17 March 2023
Enough is Enough- SBM Intelligence (Note: EiE-SBM projections predict which candidates will win states.)	Makinde	2 March 2023

== Conduct ==
=== Electoral timetable ===
On 26 February 2022, the Independent National Electoral Commission released the timetable, setting out key dates and deadlines for the election. Months later on 27 May 2022, INEC made a slight revision to the timetable, allowing parties extra time to conduct primaries.

- 28 February 2022 – Publication of Notice of Election
- 4 April 2022 – First day for the conduct of party primaries
- 9 June 2022 (Note: The original deadline was 3 June; however, INEC pushed it back to 9 June at the behest of parties.) – Final day for the conduct of party primaries, including the resolution of disputes arising from them
- 1 July 2022 – First day for submission of nomination forms to INEC via the online portal
- 15 July 2022 – Final day for submission of nomination forms to INEC via the online portal
- 12 October 2022 – Commencement of the official campaign period
- 16 March 2023 (Note: The original deadline was 9 March; however, INEC pushed it back to 16 March.) – Final day of the official campaign period

== General election ==
=== Results ===
2023 Oyo State gubernatorial election
Party	Candidate	Votes	%
A	Adebayo Adelabu		
AA	Lateef Olaniyi Ajekiigbe		
ADP	Akim Adebola Yusuf		
APP	Yinusa Kazeem Ayandoye		
AAC	Mojeed Okedara		
ADC	Ghaniyu Bamidele Ajadi		
APM	Adeyemi Oluwaseye Adeniran		
APC	Teslim Folarin		
APGA	Adeshina Adewole		
BP	Okunade Tunde Adeyemi		
LP	Tawfiq Tayo Akinwale		
New Nigeria Peoples Party	Joshua Olukayode Popoola		
NRM	Raymond Adegboyega		
PDP	Seyi Makinde		
SDP	Michael Lana		
YPP	Aduragbemi Euba		
Total votes			100.00%
Invalid or blank votes			N/A
Turnout			

==== By senatorial district ====
The results of the election by senatorial district.

Senatorial District	Adebayo Adelabu A		Teslim Folarin APC		Seyi Makinde PDP		Others		Total Valid Votes
Senatorial District	Votes	Percentage	Votes	Percentage	Votes	Percentage	Votes	Percentage	Total Valid Votes
Oyo Central Senatorial District (Note: Comprising the local government areas of Afijio, Akinyele, Atiba, Egbeda, Lagelu, Ogo Oluwa, Oluyole, Ona Ara, Oyo East, Oyo West, and Surulere.)	TBD	%	TBD	%	TBD	%	TBD	%	TBD
Oyo North Senatorial District (Note: Comprising the local government areas of Atisbo, Irepo, Iseyin, Itesiwaju, Iwajowa, Kajola, Ogbomosho North, Ogbomosho South, Olorunsogo, Orelope, Ori Ire, Saki East, and Saki West.)	TBD	%	TBD	%	TBD	%	TBD	%	TBD
Oyo South Senatorial District (Note: Comprising the local government areas of Ibadan North, Ibadan North-East, Ibadan North-West, Ibadan South-East, Ibadan South-West, Ibarapa Central, Ibarapa East, Ibarapa North, and Ido.)	TBD	%	TBD	%	TBD	%	TBD	%	TBD
Totals	TBD	%	TBD	%	TBD	%	TBD	%	TBD

==== By federal constituency ====
The results of the election by federal constituency.

Federal Constituency	Adebayo Adelabu A		Teslim Folarin APC		Seyi Makinde PDP		Others		Total Valid Votes
Federal Constituency	Votes	Percentage	Votes	Percentage	Votes	Percentage	Votes	Percentage	Total Valid Votes
Afijio/Atiba/Oyo East/Oyo West Federal Constituency (Note: Comprising the local government areas of Afijio, Atiba, Oyo East, and Oyo West.)	TBD	%	TBD	%	TBD	%	TBD	%	TBD
Akinyele/Lagelu Federal Constituency (Note: Comprising the local government areas of Akinyele and Lagelu.)	TBD	%	TBD	%	TBD	%	TBD	%	TBD
Atisbo/Saki East/Saki West Federal Constituency (Note: Comprising the local government areas of Atisbo, Saki East, and Saki West.)	TBD	%	TBD	%	TBD	%	TBD	%	TBD
Egbeda/Ona-Ara Federal Constituency (Note: Comprising the local government areas of Egbeda and Ona Ara.)	TBD	%	TBD	%	TBD	%	TBD	%	TBD
Ibadan North East/Ibadan South East Federal Constituency (Note: Comprising the local government areas of Ibadan North-East and Ibadan South-East.)	TBD	%	TBD	%	TBD	%	TBD	%	TBD
Ibadan North Federal Constituency (Note: Comprising the local government area of Ibadan North.)	TBD	%	TBD	%	TBD	%	TBD	%	TBD
Ibadan North West/Ibadan South West Federal Constituency (Note: Comprising the local government areas of Ibadan North-West and Ibadan South-West.)	TBD	%	TBD	%	TBD	%	TBD	%	TBD
Ibarapa Central/Ibarapa North Federal Constituency (Note: Comprising the local government areas of Ibarapa Central and Ibarapa North.)	TBD	%	TBD	%	TBD	%	TBD	%	TBD
Ibarapa East/Ido Federal Constituency (Note: Comprising the local government areas of Ibarapa East and Ido.)	TBD	%	TBD	%	TBD	%	TBD	%	TBD
Irepo/Olorunsogo/Orelope Federal Constituency (Note: Comprising the local government areas of Irepo, Olorunsogo, and Orelope.)	TBD	%	TBD	%	TBD	%	TBD	%	TBD
Iseyin/Kajola/Iwajowa/Itesiwaju Federal Constituency (Note: Comprising the local government areas of Iseyin, Itesiwaju, Iwajowa, and Kajola.)	TBD	%	TBD	%	TBD	%	TBD	%	TBD
Ogbomosho North/Ogbomosho South/Orire Federal Constituency (Note: Comprising the local government areas of Ogbomosho North, Ogbomosho South, and Ori Ire.)	TBD	%	TBD	%	TBD	%	TBD	%	TBD
Ogo-Oluwa/Surulere Federal Constituency (Note: Comprising the local government areas of Ogo Oluwa and Surulere.)	TBD	%	TBD	%	TBD	%	TBD	%	TBD
Oluyole Federal Constituency (Note: Comprising the local government area of Oluyole.)	TBD	%	TBD	%	TBD	%	TBD	%	TBD
Totals	TBD	%	TBD	%	TBD	%	TBD	%	TBD

==== By local government area ====
The results of the election by local government area.

LGA	Adebayo Adelabu A		Teslim Folarin APC		Seyi Makinde PDP		Others		Total Valid Votes	Turnout Percentage
LGA	Votes	Percentage	Votes	Percentage	Votes	Percentage	Votes	Percentage	Total Valid Votes	Turnout Percentage
Afijio	TBD	%	TBD	%	TBD	%	TBD	%	TBD	%
Akinyele	TBD	%	TBD	%	TBD	%	TBD	%	TBD	%
Atiba	TBD	%	TBD	%	TBD	%	TBD	%	TBD	%
Atisbo	TBD	%	TBD	%	TBD	%	TBD	%	TBD	%
Egbeda	TBD	%	TBD	%	TBD	%	TBD	%	TBD	%
Ibadan North	TBD	%	TBD	%	TBD	%	TBD	%	TBD	%
Ibadan North-East	TBD	%	TBD	%	TBD	%	TBD	%	TBD	%
Ibadan North-West	TBD	%	TBD	%	TBD	%	TBD	%	TBD	%
Ibadan South-East	TBD	%	TBD	%	TBD	%	TBD	%	TBD	%
Ibadan South-West	TBD	%	TBD	%	TBD	%	TBD	%	TBD	%
Ibarapa Central	TBD	%	TBD	%	TBD	%	TBD	%	TBD	%
Ibarapa East	TBD	%	TBD	%	TBD	%	TBD	%	TBD	%
Ibarapa North	TBD	%	TBD	%	TBD	%	TBD	%	TBD	%
Ido	TBD	%	TBD	%	TBD	%	TBD	%	TBD	%
Irepo	TBD	%	TBD	%	TBD	%	TBD	%	TBD	%
Iseyin	TBD	%	TBD	%	TBD	%	TBD	%	TBD	%
Itesiwaju	TBD	%	TBD	%	TBD	%	TBD	%	TBD	%
Iwajowa	TBD	%	TBD	%	TBD	%	TBD	%	TBD	%
Kajola	TBD	%	TBD	%	TBD	%	TBD	%	TBD	%
Lagelu	TBD	%	TBD	%	TBD	%	TBD	%	TBD	%
Ogbomosho North	TBD	%	TBD	%	TBD	%	TBD	%	TBD	%
Ogbomosho South	TBD	%	TBD	%	TBD	%	TBD	%	TBD	%
Ogo Oluwa	TBD	%	TBD	%	TBD	%	TBD	%	TBD	%
Olorunsogo	TBD	%	TBD	%	TBD	%	TBD	%	TBD	%
Oluyole	TBD	%	TBD	%	TBD	%	TBD	%	TBD	%
Ona Ara	TBD	%	TBD	%	TBD	%	TBD	%	TBD	%
Orelope	TBD	%	TBD	%	TBD	%	TBD	%	TBD	%
Ori Ire	TBD	%	TBD	%	TBD	%	TBD	%	TBD	%
Oyo East	TBD	%	TBD	%	TBD	%	TBD	%	TBD	%
Oyo West	TBD	%	TBD	%	TBD	%	TBD	%	TBD	%
Saki East	TBD	%	TBD	%	TBD	%	TBD	%	TBD	%
Saki West	TBD	%	TBD	%	TBD	%	TBD	%	TBD	%
Surulere	TBD	%	TBD	%	TBD	%	TBD	%	TBD	%
Totals	TBD	%	TBD	%	TBD	%	TBD	%	TBD	%

== See also ==
- 2023 Nigerian elections
- 2023 Nigerian gubernatorial elections
