= 2027 Oyo State gubernatorial election =

2027 gubernatorial election in Oyo State, Nigeria

- 11 March 2027
Party	APC	PDP
Governor before election
Seyi Makinde
PDP
Elected Governor
TBD
TBD

The 2027 Oyo State gubernatorial election will take place on 11 March 2027, to elect the Governor of Oyo State, concurrent with elections to the Oyo State House of Assembly as well as twenty-seven other gubernatorial elections and elections to all other state houses of assembly. The election will be held two weeks after the presidential election and National Assembly elections. Incumbent PDP Governor Seyi Makinde is not eligible to run for re-election.

== Electoral system ==
The Governor of Oyo State is elected using a modified two-round system. To be elected in the first round, a candidate must receive the plurality of the vote and over 25% of the vote in at least two-thirds of state local government areas. If no candidate passes this threshold, a second round will be held between the top candidate and the next candidate to have received a plurality of votes in the highest number of local government areas.

== Primary elections ==
The primaries, along with any potential challenges to primary results, will take place between 4 April and 3 June 2022.

=== All Progressives Congress ===
==== Declared ====
- Hazeem Gbolarumi: Deputy Governor (2007–2011)
- Joseph Olasunkanmi Tegbe: 2019 APC gubernatorial candidate
- Sharafadeen Alli:

==== Potential ====
- Adebayo Adelabu: 2023 Accord gubernatorial nominee and former CBN Deputy Governor of Operations (2014–2018)
- Teslim Folarin: Senator for Oyo Central (2003–2011; 2019–present) and 2023 APC gubernatorial nominee

=== Allied Peoples Movement ===
Nominee: Abimbola Adekanmbi

=== People's Democratic Party ===
==== Declared ====
- Popoola Olukayode Joshua: engineer

== See also ==
- 2027 Nigerian general election
- 2027 Nigerian gubernatorial elections
