= Adebayo Shittu =

Nigerian politician (born 1953)

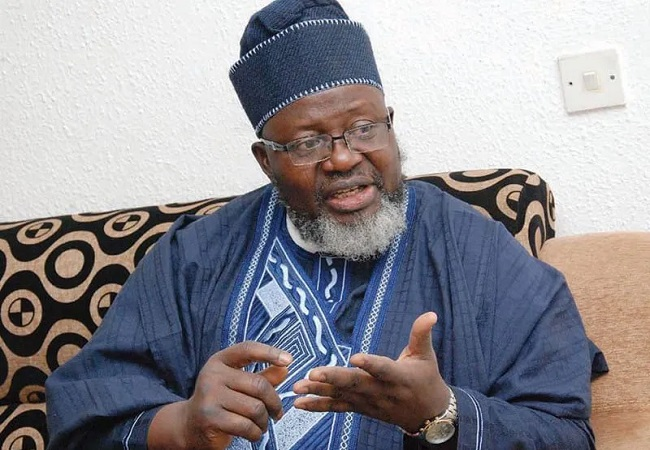
- Adebayo Shittu at the ITU Telecom World 2016

Minister of Communications
- In office 11 November 2015 – 28 May 2019
- President: Muhammadu Buhari
- Preceded by: Omobola Johnson
- Succeeded by: Isa Ali Pantami

Member of the Oyo State House of Assembly
- In office October 1979 – October 1983

Personal details
- Born: Abdur-Raheem Adebayo Shittu; 23 March 1953 (age 73)
- Party: All Progressives Congress
- Education: Obafemi Awolowo University (LL.B.)
- Occupation: Politician; lawyer; author
- Awards: List of honors and awards

Abdur-Raheem Adebayo Shittu (born 23 March 1953) is a Nigerian lawyer and politician who served as minister of communications of Nigeria from 2015 to 2019. Before becoming minister, he had earlier served as a member of the Oyo State House of Assembly, becoming the youngest Honourable member at age 26, to take the office.

== Early life and education ==
Shittu gained admission into University of Ife, now Obafemi Awolowo University, Ile-Ife, Osun South West, Nigeria in the year 1974. At the end of 1978, he had obtained his first degree in Law from the same university. He ventured into politics at the age of 26 years. In 1979, he became a member of old Oyo House of Assembly.

== Career ==
In 1983, Shittu was elected as a member of the Oyo State House of Assembly in the second republic. In 1983, the military government took over from the civilian government and he retired into legal practice and writing profession. He became a Member of National Political conference in 2005. In 2011, he contested of Gubernatorial ticket under the platform of C.P.C and lost out to the incumbent of late senator Abiola Ajimobi. During the first tenure of the administration of President Muhammadu Buhari, he was appointed as the Minister of communications in Nigeria from the year 2015 - 2019.

== Books ==
Shittu has written the following books

- Islam and Christianity: Why the conflict? - 1979, ISBN 978-9783148444
- A modern introduction to Islam - 1979, ISBN 978-9783148468
- Muslim Prayers for Everyday Success - 1985, ISBN 978-1484098134
- What is Sunnan? What is Bidi'a?-1996
- The position of Islam on interest (Ribbah) Derivable from current Accounts, Savings Account and Fixed deposit-1996
- Daawah: the duty of every Muslim-1994
- A Book of Qur'anic parables-2015
- Path to Democratic socialism in Nigeria-1979
- Justice in the shari'ah-1981
- Islam for the sake of humanity-1998
- Al-qur'anic: the first book of science-1994
- A critique of Dr Adekilekum Tijjani's Handbook on the Tijjaniya-1996
- Muslim path of paradise-1994

== Political offices ==
- Honourable Member of the Oyo State House of Assembly in the Second Republic in 1979
- Oyo State Commissioner for Information, Culture and Home Affairs (in the Victor Omololu Olunloyo administration) between October and December, 1983
- Attorney General and Oyo State Commissioner for Justice (in the Rashidi Adewolu Ladoja government)
- Member of the National Political Reforms Conference in 2005
- Minister of Communications. 2015-2019

== Achievements And Contributions To Socio-Economic Growth ==
=== Contributions To The Party ===
- Donated 2 Nos (18 seater Buses) to the Oyo State chapters of the All Progressives Congress
- Donated a total of 5 nos (18 seater Buses) to the following Local Government chapters of All Progressives Congress. 1) APC,Saki Local Government chapter.2)APC Ogbomoso North local Government chapters. 3) APC Ido Local Government chapters.4) APC Ogbomoso South Local Government chapters.5)APC Egbeda Local Government chapters

=== Contributions To Society ===
- Built 3 nos mechanised water Boreholes in part of Shaki-West Local Government Area of Oke-Ogun in Oyo state. In addition to a 4th one located by MTN foundation located at 1) Beside Kakako compound. 2) Beside Shehu Aluminium compound Aiyekale shaki-west.3) Opposite kinnikinnick primary school
- Built 3 nos mechanised water Boreholes in part of Iseyin Local Government in Oke-Ogun in Area of Oyo Boreholes in 6 different local Government Area of Ibadan land. 1)Aba Alfa bus-stop olomi Area Oluyole LGA 2) Aiyekale Bus-stop, ona-ara LGA. 3)Lanes C.A.C Oke Imola Area. 4)lanes bus-stop Aremo Ibadan north 5) Beside lam Adesina former office oba adentunji, way

=== Education And I.C.T Developments ===
- facilitated the donation/construction of a 250,000,000,00 (Two hundred and fifty million naira only) Computer ICT hub at the Oke-Ogun Polytechnic.
- facilitated of the Donations/Constructions of ICT schools knowledge at some several schools. 1) Oriya aperin boy's high schools. 2) Oolo community grammar school. 3) Abiodon Atiba grammar school, kosobo Oyo 4) Muslim grammar school, oke taasi school 5) Koshin community grammar school Igbeti road koshi. 6) Muslim high school Igbeti
- Facilitated the establishment of a multi million naira ict Center hub at Shaki parapo high school sango Shaki
- facilitated the installation of a wide area network (WAN)at Ibadan polytechnic
- facilitated the on-going construction of a multi million naira ict at Women development centre, Samoda Ibadan
- facilitated the donations of multi million naira ict at FCE Ibadan
- facilitated establishment of a police secondary school at Igboora in Ibarapa land
- Sponsored 12 citizens of Oyo State at master's degree level
- Actively promoted the establishment of an ICT park of the ministry of communication within the Abuja technology village
- Establishment of ICT Development Bank
- Initiated the repositioning of the Nigeria postal service(NIPOST)
- Establishment
- Nipost microfinance bank
- Nipost property and development company ltd
- NIPOST transport and logistics company Ltd
- NIPOST E-commerce service company Ltd
- NIPOST E-government service company Ltd
- NIPOST digital service company Ltd

== Awards and recognition ==
- Emerge Technology Summit Award
- Oke-ogun Development Council Award
- Nigerian Bar Association Ibadan chapter Award
- Nipost Service Award
- Technology And Innovation Hall of Fame Delta State Award
- Lagos State Chamber Of Commence And Industry Award
- Wanostar Merit Award
- Society of Family Physician Of Nigeria Award
- Association of Telecommunications of Professional of Nigeria Award
- National Youth Merit Award
- Distinguished Personality Award presented by Muslim media Group Of Nigeria
- Worthy Ambassador Award
- Youth Focus Initiative Award
- Excellence Award
- National Association of Muslim Law Student O.A.U Chapter Award
- University Of Ibadan School Of Business Award
- Freelance independent Broadcasters Of Nigeria Award
- Nigerian Computer Society Award
- Path on For Loyalty Peace And Security by Nigeria Police Force Award
- Nigerian mobile economy Award
- TAAC 2018 Award
- Association of mobile communication device technician of Nigeria Award
- Omolere, Omolasho Nigeria, widows support, orphanage, men and women empowerment skills Award
- Business Day Public Service Excellence Award
- Cyber security challenge Nigeria Award
- Methodist Church of Nigeria, Diocese Ogbomosho special Award
- Honorary Degree of Doctor of Public Administration (DPA) by the west Africa University Cotonou Benin Republic
- Bayero University, Kano Award
