= 2027 Nigerian presidential election =

Upcoming presidential election in Nigeria

- January 16, 2027
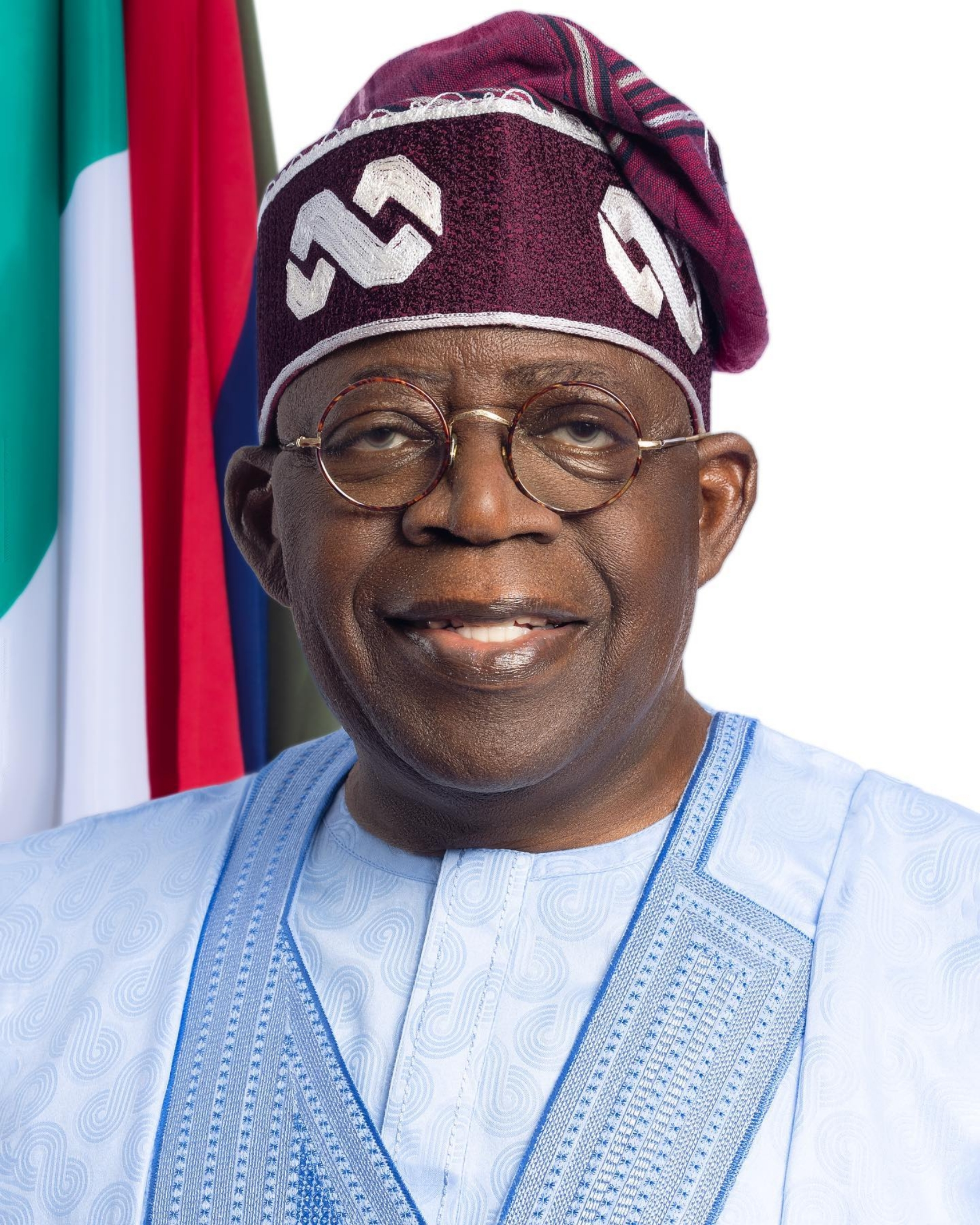

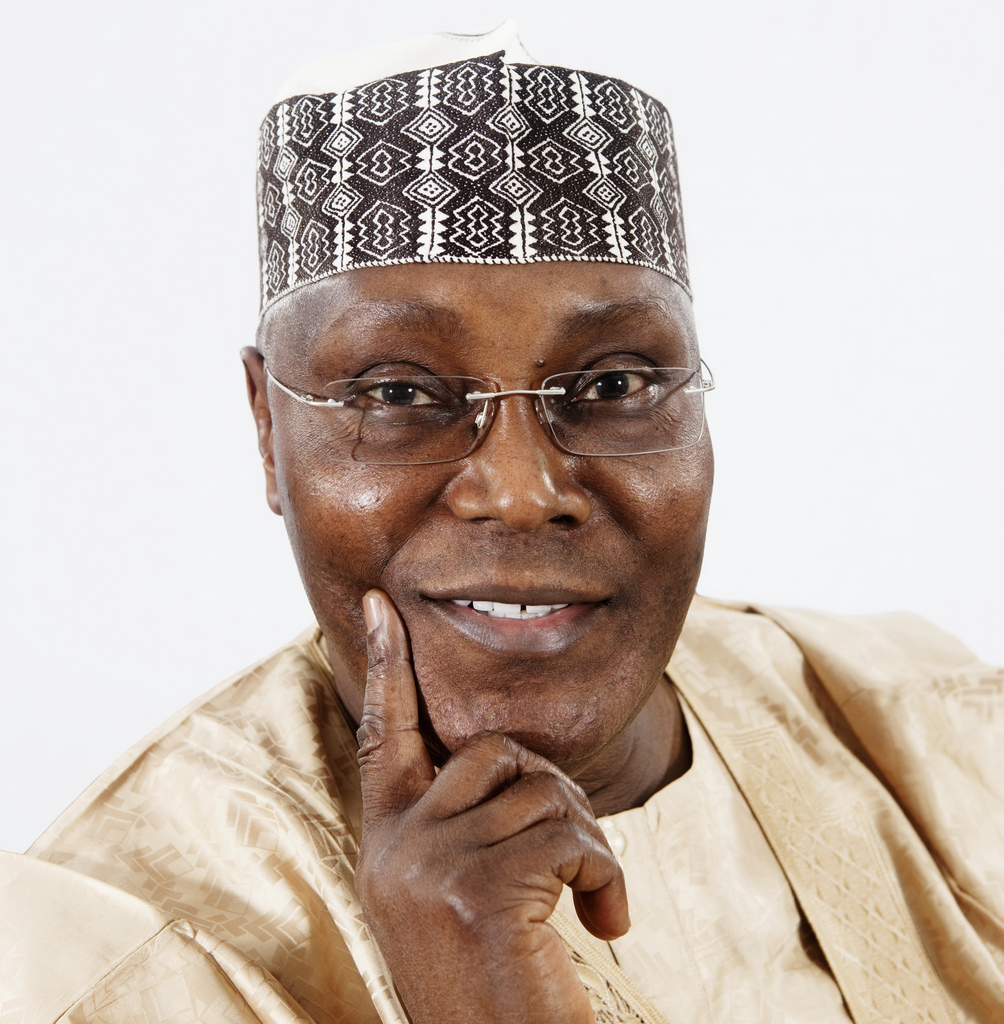

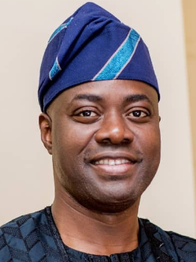
Nominee	Bola Tinubu	Atiku Abubakar
Party	APC	ADC
Home state	Lagos	Adamawa
Running mate	Kashim Shettima	Rotimi Amaechi
Nominee	Peter Obi	Seyi Makinde
Party	NDC	APM
Home state	Anambra	Oyo
Running mate	Rabiu Kwankwaso	Musa Lawal Daura
Incumbent President
Bola Tinubu
APC

The 2027 Nigerian presidential election is scheduled to take place on 16 January 2027 to elect the president and vice president of Nigeria. The election will be held as part of the country's 2027 general elections. The incumbent president, Bola Tinubu, is seeking re-election as the candidate of the All Progressives Congress (APC).

The Independent National Electoral Commission (INEC) published its final list of presidential candidates in September 2026, listing 18 candidates and their running mates. Among those listed are former vice president Atiku Abubakar, contesting under the African Democratic Congress (ADC); former governor of Anambra State Peter Obi, contesting under the Nigeria Democratic Congress (NDC); and Oyo State governor Oluseyi Abiodun Makinde, contesting under the Allied Peoples Movement (APM).

The election is taking place amid political realignments following the 2023 general election, in which Tinubu was elected president, Atiku finished second and Obi finished third. The nomination of Atiku as the ADC's presidential candidate has also become the subject of a court dispute concerning the party's leadership and the validity of decisions taken by its caretaker leadership.

== Background ==
=== 2023 presidential election ===
The 2023 Nigerian presidential election was contested by 18 candidates. Bola Tinubu of the All Progressives Congress was declared the winner by INEC, receiving 8,794,726 votes. Atiku Abubakar, then the candidate of the Peoples Democratic Party (PDP), finished second with 6,984,520 votes, while Peter Obi of the Labour Party finished third with 6,101,533 votes. Rabiu Musa Kwankwaso of the New Nigeria Peoples Party (NNPP) finished fourth with 1,496,687 votes.

Tinubu succeeded Muhammadu Buhari as president on 29 May 2023. His administration's policies, particularly economic reforms and security measures, have become prominent issues in the political debate preceding the 2027 election. The removal of the petrol subsidy and changes to foreign-exchange policy have been among the major economic issues discussed by the government and opposition parties.

=== Political realignments ===
The period preceding the 2027 election has seen changes in party affiliation among prominent political figures. Atiku Abubakar, who contested the 2023 election for the PDP, emerged as the ADC's presidential candidate. Peter Obi, who contested in 2023 for the Labour Party, became the presidential candidate of the NDC. Oyo State governor Oluseyi Makinde was listed as the presidential candidate of the APM.

The emergence of separate presidential tickets among opposition figures followed discussions about possible political cooperation and the formation of a common opposition platform. The final list published by INEC confirmed candidates from 18 political parties.

== Electoral system ==
The president of Nigeria is elected using a two-round system. Under section 134 of the Constitution of Nigeria, a candidate is elected in the first ballot if the candidate receives the highest number of votes cast and at least one-quarter of the votes cast in each of at least two-thirds of all the states of the federation and the Federal Capital Territory.

If no candidate satisfies the constitutional requirements, a second election is held in accordance with the provisions of section 134. The Constitution sets out the candidates eligible to participate in the subsequent ballot and the conditions for determining the winner.

The president and vice president are elected on a joint ticket. Each presidential candidate nominates a running mate, who contests for the office of vice president.

== Election timetable ==
INEC initially announced a timetable for the 2027 general elections in February 2026. Following the enactment of the Electoral Act 2026, the commission issued a revised timetable on 26 February 2026. Under the revised schedule, the presidential and National Assembly elections were moved to 16 January 2027, while governorship and State Houses of Assembly elections were scheduled for 6 February 2027.

The principal activities relating to the presidential election include:

Activity	Date
Conduct of party primaries, including resolution of disputes	23 April – 30 May 2026
Commencement of public campaigns for presidential and National Assembly elections	19 August 2026
Last day of public campaigns	15 January 2027
Presidential and National Assembly elections	16 January 2027

The Electoral Act provides that public campaigning must end 24 hours before election day.

== Party primaries ==
The nomination of presidential candidates for the 2027 general elections was governed by the Electoral Act 2026, which introduced changes to the procedures through which political parties select candidates for elective offices. The Act provides for two methods of candidate nomination: direct primaries and consensus. It removed indirect primaries, which had been permitted under the Electoral Act 2022.

Under the previous system, political parties could select their candidates through direct primaries, indirect primaries or consensus. Indirect primaries involved the selection of delegates who subsequently voted at a party convention to determine the party's candidate. The 2026 Act removed this option, requiring parties to use either direct primaries or consensus.

=== Direct primaries ===
Section 84(2) of the Electoral Act 2026 provides that the procedure for the nomination of candidates by political parties for elective positions shall be by direct primaries or consensus. Under the direct primary system, eligible members of a political party participate directly in selecting the party's candidate, rather than leaving the decision to a convention of delegates.

Section 86 provides that direct primaries are to be conducted in accordance with the guidelines of the political party concerned. The Independent National Electoral Commission is responsible for monitoring party primaries.

The Act also introduced statutory requirements concerning party membership registers. Under section 77(5), only members whose names appear in the party's membership register submitted to INEC at least 21 days before a primary, congress or convention are eligible to participate. Section 77(6) requires parties to use the register submitted to the commission for these exercises, while section 77(7) provides that a party that fails to submit its register within the prescribed period is not eligible to field a candidate in the election.

The membership-register provisions were particularly significant because they made the accuracy and timely submission of party membership records important to the conduct and validity of primaries. INEC's 2026 Regulations and Guidelines for Political Parties also set out requirements for the submission of membership registers and the documents needed for the monitoring of primaries.

=== Consensus candidates ===
The second method permitted by the Act is the selection of a consensus candidate. Under section 87(1), a political party adopting consensus must obtain the written consent of all cleared aspirants for the position. The consent must indicate their voluntary withdrawal from the contest and their endorsement of the consensus candidate.

The provision means that a party cannot validly impose a consensus candidate simply by announcing that its leadership has reached an agreement. Aspirants who have been cleared to contest must voluntarily agree to withdraw and endorse the selected candidate.

The consensus option was presented as an alternative to conducting direct primaries, particularly where aspirants could reach an agreement on a common candidate. However, it also made the consent of competing aspirants an important legal requirement in the nomination process.

=== Legal challenge to the new provisions ===
The provisions governing direct primaries and membership registers became the subject of litigation in 2026. The Zenith Labour Party challenged sections 77(5), 77(6), 77(7) and 84(2) of the Electoral Act, arguing that they infringed on the constitutional autonomy of political parties.

On 16 July 2026, the Court of Appeal ruled in favour of the party and invalidated the challenged provisions. The court held that the provisions conflicted with constitutional provisions governing political parties. It clarified that its decision affected the specified subsections rather than invalidating the entirety of sections 77 and 84.

The Independent National Electoral Commission appealed the decision to the Supreme Court. On 24 September 2026, the Supreme Court allowed INEC's appeal, set aside the Court of Appeal judgment and restored the Federal High Court's earlier decision dismissing the challenge. The Supreme Court upheld the validity of the disputed provisions, including the requirement that parties nominate candidates through direct primaries or consensus and comply with the statutory membership-register requirements.

The Supreme Court's decision confirmed the statutory framework for the nomination of candidates ahead of the 2027 general elections. Political parties were consequently required to conduct their nomination exercises in accordance with the restored provisions of the Electoral Act 2026.

=== Selection of major presidential candidates ===
==== All Progressives Congress ====
The All Progressives Congress (APC) selected incumbent President Bola Tinubu through nationwide direct primaries held on 23 May 2026. The exercise was conducted across the 36 states and the Federal Capital Territory, covering 774 local government areas and 8,809 wards.

Tinubu defeated his only challenger, Stanley Osifo, in the exercise. According to the results announced by the APC Presidential Election Committee, Tinubu received 10,999,162 votes, while Osifo received 16,503 votes. The committee reported that 12,643,316 party members were registered, 11,069,746 were accredited and 11,015,665 votes were cast.

The results were collated in Abuja, after which Tinubu was presented with the party's certificate of return and flag as its presidential candidate. He subsequently retained Vice President Kashim Shettima as his running mate.

==== African Democratic Congress ====
The African Democratic Congress (ADC) conducted nationwide direct primaries to select its presidential candidate. Voting took place across the country on 25 May 2026, with the collation of results beginning the following day and continuing at the party's national collation centre in Abuja.

Former vice president Atiku Abubakar contested against former Rivers State governor Rotimi Amaechi and businessman Mohammed Hayatu-Deen. Atiku was declared the winner after receiving 1,846,370 votes. Amaechi received 504,117 votes, while Hayatu-Deen received 177,120 votes.

Atiku's victory was disputed by the other aspirants. Amaechi and Hayatu-Deen alleged irregularities and voter disenfranchisement during the exercise. Amaechi described the announced results as concocted, while the party proceeded with the collation and declaration of Atiku as its candidate.

Atiku subsequently selected Amaechi as his running mate. The party's nomination process later became the subject of a separate legal dispute concerning the legitimacy of its leadership and the actions of the caretaker executive that organised the primary.

==== Nigeria Democratic Congress ====
The Nigeria Democratic Congress (NDC) selected former Anambra State governor Peter Obi as its presidential candidate through a consensus arrangement at its national convention in Abuja on 30 May 2026.

Obi had formally joined the party on 3 May 2026 after leaving the African Democratic Congress. The NDC subsequently zoned its presidential ticket to the South for the 2027 election. Obi was screened and cleared to contest the party's presidential primary on 19 May, becoming its sole cleared presidential aspirant.

At the national convention, a motion for Obi's ratification was moved by Senator Victor Umeh and seconded by former Deputy Senate President Ovie Omo-Agege. The motion was adopted by the convention, confirming Obi as the party's presidential candidate. Obi subsequently announced former Kano State governor Rabiu Musa Kwankwaso as his running mate.

==== Allied Peoples Movement ====
The Allied Peoples Movement (APM) selected Oyo State governor Oluseyi Makinde as its presidential candidate through a consensus arrangement. The selection was endorsed by the party's 36 state chairmen.

Makinde was formally presented with the party's certificate of return and flag at an event held at Theophilus Ogunlesi Hall in Ibadan on 30 May 2026. The party's national chairman, Yusuf Dantalle, described the arrangement as a consensus decision and called on members to unite behind the candidate ahead of the general election.

Makinde subsequently emerged on the party's presidential ticket with Musa Lawal Daura as his running mate, according to INEC's final list of candidates.

==== Peoples Democratic Party ====
The Peoples Democratic Party (PDP) selected former senator Sandy Ojang Onor as its presidential candidate through a consensus process conducted by the faction led by Abdulrahman Mohammed.

The party's presidential primaries collation committee, chaired by former Benue State governor Samuel Ortom, said the exercise followed consultations and voice votes conducted among party members across the states. Onor emerged as the sole presidential aspirant of the faction and was formally presented with the party's certificate of return and flag at the party's national secretariat in Abuja on 26 May 2026. The exercise was monitored by officials of INEC.

The nomination took place amid an internal leadership dispute within the PDP. A rival faction aligned with former national chairman Kabiru Turaki announced former president Goodluck Jonathan as its presidential candidate. However, the Supreme Court had previously invalidated the 2025 Ibadan convention through which the Turaki-aligned faction's leadership emerged, and INEC did not recognise its presidential nomination. The commission subsequently listed Onor as the PDP's presidential candidate.

Onor was subsequently listed by INEC with Umaru Babangida as his running mate.

== Political parties and candidates ==
INEC published its final list of presidential and vice-presidential candidates in September 2026. The list contained 18 presidential candidates representing 18 political parties.

The candidates and their running mates, as listed by INEC, are shown below. Names have been presented in conventional given-name-first order.

Political party	Presidential candidate	Vice-presidential candidate
Action Alliance (AA)	Rufai Adekunle Omo-Aje	Shehu Hussaini
African Action Congress (AAC)	Omoyele Sowore	Haruna Garba Magashi
African Democratic Congress (ADC)	Atiku Abubakar	Chibuike Rotimi Amaechi
Action Democratic Party (ADP)	Aliyu Abbas-Bin	Chinazam Ike
All Progressives Congress (APC)	Bola Ahmed Tinubu	Kashim Shettima
Allied Peoples Movement (APM)	Oluseyi Abiodun Makinde	Musa Lawal Daura
Action Peoples Party (APP)	Kabiru Yusuf	Peace Egobia Ofordile
Boot Party (BP)	Sunday Adenuga	Usman Turaki Mustapha
Democratic Leadership Alliance (DLA)	Moses Olusoji Adebisi	Nafisat Usaku Abubakar
Labour Party (LP)	Sunday Chibuzo Okereke	Hajja Bintu Konto
Nigeria Democratic Congress (NDC)	Peter Gregory Obi	Rabiu Musa Kwankwaso
National Democratic Party (NDP)	Ada Elizabeth Fredrick Okwori	Uchenna Anthony Chukwuemeka
National Rescue Movement (NRM)	Nkem Esther Okereke	Nasir Muhammed Sulaiman
Peoples Democratic Party (PDP)	Sandy Ojang Onor	Umaru Babangida
People's Redemption Party (PRP)	Donald Duke	Sule Mohammed
Social Democratic Party (SDP)	Adewole Ebenezer Adebayo	Usman Muhammed Bugaje
Young Progressives Party (YPP)	Peter Ada Agada	Patience Ndidi Key
Zenith Labour Party (ZLP)	Daniel Daberechukwu Nwanyanwu	Hassan Khalid

=== Prominent candidates ===
Among the candidates listed by INEC are the incumbent president, a former vice president, a former state governor who contested the 2023 election, and a serving state governor.

- Bola Ahmed Tinubu (APC): The incumbent president of Nigeria, elected in 2023, is seeking another term with Vice President Kashim Shettima as his running mate.
- Atiku Abubakar (ADC): A former vice president, Abubakar was the PDP's presidential candidate in 2023. He was listed by INEC as the ADC's candidate, with former Rivers State governor Chibuike Rotimi Amaechi as his running mate.
- Peter Gregory Obi (NDC): The former governor of Anambra State was the Labour Party's presidential candidate in 2023. He is contesting the 2027 election for the NDC, with former Kano State governor Rabiu Musa Kwankwaso as his running mate.
- Oluseyi Abiodun Makinde (APM): The governor of Oyo State is listed as the APM's presidential candidate, with Musa Lawal Daura as his running mate.

=== Legal dispute over Atiku Abubakar's candidacy ===
On 5 November 2026, the Federal High Court in Abuja delivered a judgment concerning the leadership of the African Democratic Congress and the process through which Atiku Abubakar emerged as the party's presidential candidate.

The suit was brought by Nafiu Bala Gombe, a former national deputy chairman of the ADC. Gombe challenged the process through which the caretaker leadership headed by David Mark assumed control of the party. He argued that the leadership had not emerged through the party's constitutionally prescribed procedures and sought orders invalidating actions taken by the caretaker leadership.

Justice Peter Lifu ruled in favour of the plaintiff and set aside the processes that produced the Mark-led party executive. Reuters reported that the ruling also set aside the process leading to Atiku's nomination as the ADC's presidential candidate. The judgment therefore raised questions about the validity of the party's presidential nomination ahead of the election.

The ADC rejected the ruling and announced that it would challenge the decision at the Court of Appeal. On 6 November, the party said it had filed an appeal and an application for a stay of execution. The party also asked INEC not to take consequential action while the appeal was pending. The filing of an appeal or an application for a stay does not, by itself, suspend the judgment.

On 11 November, ADC lawyer Kalu Kalu disputed the interpretation that the judgment had expressly nullified Atiku's candidacy. Following the release of the certified true copy of the judgment, Kalu argued that the court's operative orders invalidated actions taken by the Mark-led leadership but did not specifically name or disqualify Atiku. This position differed from the interpretation reported by several news organisations following the judgment.

As of 15 November 2026, the legal dispute over the ADC leadership and Atiku Abubakar's nomination remained unresolved. Atiku's name appeared on INEC's published final list, while the consequences of the Federal High Court judgment and the party's appeal remained contested.

== Campaign ==
=== Campaign activities ===
Public campaigning for the presidential and National Assembly elections officially commenced on 19 August 2026, in accordance with INEC's revised timetable. Campaign activities include political rallies, public addresses, media appearances, party mobilisation and the presentation of candidates' policy programmes.

President Bola Tinubu's campaign has defended the economic reforms undertaken by his administration, including the removal of the petrol subsidy and changes to foreign-exchange policy. The administration has argued that the reforms are intended to improve public finances and strengthen the economy. Opposition figures have criticised the effects of the reforms on living costs and household finances.

The campaign is taking place against the background of debate over the economy, insecurity, employment, public infrastructure and governance.

=== Campaign issues ===
The 2027 presidential campaign has featured competing proposals on economic management, the cost of living, fuel pricing, national security, electricity, employment and public services. President Bola Tinubu and the All Progressives Congress (APC) have defended the economic reforms introduced by his administration, while opposition candidates have proposed varying approaches to economic recovery, social welfare and the management of the country's petroleum resources.

==== Economy and cost of living ====
Economic management and the rising cost of living have been central themes of the campaign. Tinubu has defended the removal of the petrol subsidy and changes to the foreign exchange system, arguing that the reforms were necessary to address structural weaknesses in the economy. He has promised to build on his administration's policies through industrialisation, infrastructure development, energy security and increased domestic food production.

Atiku Abubakar has advocated a production-led economic programme focused on agriculture, industrialisation, employment and improved wages. His proposals include social protection measures and reducing the cost of governance. He has also called for the restoration of a form of petrol subsidy, linked to domestic production and refining, as a means of reducing energy and transportation costs.

Peter Obi has placed emphasis on production, investment and human capital development. His proposals include increasing agricultural productivity, expanding manufacturing and agro-processing, and retaining the floating exchange-rate framework while seeking to strengthen the productive capacity of the economy. He has also proposed expanding access to healthcare through health insurance and increasing investment in the health sector.

Seyi Makinde's Reset Nigeria manifesto argues that macroeconomic reforms should translate into improvements in household welfare, employment and incomes. It proposes a broader economic restructuring programme, including measures to improve productivity, strengthen social protection and make government performance more measurable. The manifesto also proposes a 100-day delivery plan through which citizens would be able to monitor the implementation of government commitments.

==== Fuel pricing and petroleum policy ====
The future of petrol pricing has been another major point of disagreement. Tinubu has defended the removal of the petrol subsidy and maintained that the country should continue with the post-subsidy reform framework introduced by his administration.

Atiku has proposed restoring a form of subsidy for petroleum products, with government support linked to domestic production and refining. Obi has also proposed a transparent system of intervention in fuel pricing, alongside mechanisms for monitoring crude oil production, transactions, imports, exports and revenues in the petroleum sector.

Makinde has rejected a return to the previous subsidy arrangement. Instead, he has proposed that crude oil supplied to domestic refineries should be priced differently from crude sold for export, arguing that locally produced crude should give Nigerian consumers an advantage in the price of refined petroleum products. His manifesto also proposes a Domestic Energy Value Credit through which Nigerians would benefit directly from value generated by domestic refining.

Adewole Adebayo has proposed a petrol price of no more than ₦200 per litre, alongside a similar price ceiling for cooking gas and aviation fuel. His plan includes rehabilitating existing refineries, establishing four functional refineries and expanding electricity generation to 75,000 megawatts. He has said the proposed fuel prices would be supported by increased domestic refining and revenue from other petroleum products.

Donald Duke has questioned the historical management and transparency of Nigeria's petrol subsidy system, arguing that the country should focus on productivity and the availability of the infrastructure needed for economic activity. His position differs from candidates who have proposed restoring or restructuring the subsidy.

==== Security ====
Security has featured prominently in the campaigns, particularly in relation to kidnapping, banditry, terrorism and attacks on rural communities. Tinubu has defended his administration's security operations and promised continued investment in security infrastructure and the capacity of the armed forces.

Obi has promised a more coordinated approach to national security, with greater emphasis on intelligence gathering, inter-agency cooperation and addressing the causes of insecurity. He has also pledged a tougher response to kidnappers and those responsible for attacks on schools and the abduction of pupils.

Makinde's manifesto proposes a coordinated intelligence and early-warning system, alongside a constitutional framework for state police. The proposals form part of a broader plan to redistribute security responsibilities between federal and state governments.

Sowore has proposed the use of drones and technology in national defence and security operations. His manifesto also places emphasis on police reform and the use of intelligence technology to confront insecurity. He has presented these proposals as part of a wider programme of technological modernisation of government institutions.

Adebayo has promised to tackle insecurity within four years if elected, making it a central commitment of his party's 2027–2031 manifesto, Farewell to Poverty and Insecurity.

==== Electricity and infrastructure ====
Electricity supply has also featured in the candidates' economic proposals. Obi has pledged to increase electricity generation and distribution by at least 10,000 megawatts within four years, alongside investment in infrastructure and rail transportation.

Sowore has promised 24-hour electricity as part of his proposed economic and industrial programme. His wider agenda includes the use of technology in public administration and increased investment in domestic production.

Adebayo has proposed expanding electricity generation to 75,000 megawatts, while Makinde's manifesto includes proposals for domestic energy development and reforms intended to improve the country's economic infrastructure.

==== Employment, wages and social welfare ====
Employment, wages and social protection have featured in several opposition manifestos. Atiku has proposed improved wages, job creation and social protection as part of a production-led economic programme, while Obi has emphasised investment in human capital, education and healthcare.

Sowore has proposed a monthly living minimum wage of ₦500,000, arguing that wages should reflect the cost of living. He has also promised free education and the construction of one million public mixed-income homes. His proposals form part of a broader programme focused on redistribution, public services and reducing economic inequality.

Adebayo has proposed free education and healthcare, as well as limits on transportation and housing costs relative to workers' salaries. His manifesto presents these measures as part of a wider programme to reduce poverty and improve living standards.

==== Education and healthcare ====
Education and healthcare have featured in the candidates' proposals on human capital development. Tinubu has highlighted the Nigerian Education Loan Fund and his administration's investments in education, while Obi has proposed expanded health insurance coverage and increased healthcare spending.

Makinde's Reset Nigeria manifesto includes a national foundational learning guarantee intended to improve basic education outcomes. Adebayo has proposed free education and healthcare, while Sowore has also pledged free education as part of his social welfare programme.

=== Governance and institutional reform ===
Governance, accountability and institutional reform have also featured in the campaign. Atiku has proposed reducing the cost of governance and addressing the use of opaque security votes, while Obi has emphasised transparency, accountability and the fight against corruption.

Sowore has proposed the use of artificial intelligence in public financial management to identify fraud and irregularities in government expenditure. He has also proposed using blockchain technology to create a permanent public record of government transactions, presenting the measures as tools for improving transparency and reducing corruption.

Makinde has proposed constitutional and electoral reforms, including a requirement that a presidential candidate secure at least 51 per cent of the vote to be elected. He has also proposed a transitional government of national unity as part of efforts to address political divisions and institutional weaknesses.

==== Campaign promises and implementation ====
The candidates' proposals vary considerably in their scope, particularly on fuel pricing, electricity generation, wages and the role of government in the economy. Some have announced detailed manifestos, while others have made individual policy commitments during campaign events and public appearances. The feasibility, funding and implementation of the proposals have therefore remained subjects of public discussion ahead of the election.
