= 2003 Nigerian Senate elections in Oyo State =

2003 Nigerian Senate election in Oyo State

The 2003 Nigerian Senate election in Oyo State was held on April 12, 2003, to elect members of the Nigerian Senate to represent Oyo State. Teslim Folarin representing Oyo Central and Robert Koleoso representing Oyo North won on the platform of Peoples Democratic Party, while Abiola Ajimobi representing Oyo South won on the platform of the Alliance for Democracy.

== Overview ==
Affiliation	Party		Total
Affiliation	PDP	AD	Total
Before Election			3
After Election	2	1	3

== Summary ==
District	Incumbent	Party	Elected Senator	Party
Oyo Central			Teslim Folarin	PDP
Oyo North			Robert Koleoso	PDP
Oyo South			Abiola Ajimobi	AD

== Results ==
=== Oyo Central ===
The election was won by Teslim Folarin of the Peoples Democratic Party.

2003 Nigerian Senate election in Oyo State
Party	Candidate	Votes	%
PDP	Teslim Folarin		
Total votes			
PDP hold			

=== Oyo North ===
The election was won by Robert Koleoso of the Peoples Democratic Party.

2003 Nigerian Senate election in Oyo State
Party	Candidate	Votes	%
PDP	Robert Koleoso		
Total votes			
PDP hold			

=== Oyo South ===
The election was won by Abiola Ajimobi of the Alliance for Democracy.

2003 Nigerian Senate election in Oyo State
Party	Candidate	Votes	%
AD	Abiola Ajimobi		
Total votes			
AD hold			
