= Akinola Ojo =

Nigerian accountant and politician

Hon. Akinola Ojo

Commissioner for Finance, Oyo State
- Incumbent
- Assumed office 2019
- Governor: Seyi Makinde

Personal details
- Born: Lagos State, Nigeria
- Education: University of Lagos, London Business School
- Occupation: Politician, accountant, administrator

Akinola Ojo is a Nigerian accountant, administrator, and politician who serves as Commissioner for Finance of Oyo State.

== Education ==
Ojo attended King's College, Lagos from 1982 to 1987. He then studied Accounting at the University of Lagos, graduating with a bachelor's degree between 1987 and 1992. He later obtained a master's degree in Leadership and Strategy from the London Business School.

== Career ==
Ojo has worked with both indigenous and multinational oil and gas firms.

=== Political career ===
In 2019, he was nominated by Governor Seyi Makinde for a commissioner position and was subsequently confirmed by the Oyo State House of Assembly. He was appointed Commissioner for Finance and has held the office since then.
