= Oluwatoyin Mojisola Fadeyi =

Nigerian judge

Hon. Justice Oluwatoyin Mojisola Fadeyi

Judge of the High Court of Oyo State
- Incumbent
- Assumed office 27 May 2013
- Appointed by: Abiola Ajimobi

Personal details
- Born: Ibadan, Oyo State, Nigeria
- Education: Obafemi Awolowo University (LL.B)
- Occupation: Jurist

Oluwatoyin Mojisola Fadeyi (née Akintola) is a Nigerian judge who has served on the High Court of Oyo State since 2013. She was appointed to the bench on 27 May 2013 by Governor Abiola Ajimobi.

== Early life and education ==
Fadeyi was born in Ibadan, Oyo State. She attended Sacred Hearts Nursery and Primary School, Ring Road, Ibadan, and later Our Lady of Apostles Secondary School, Mary Way, Ibadan.

She studied law at Obafemi Awolowo University, Ile‑Ife, where she obtained her Bachelor of Laws (LL.B) degree. After completing her legal studies, she attended the Nigerian Law School and was called to the Bar in December 1991.

== Career ==
Fadeyi began her professional career during her National Youth Service Corps (NYSC) year, working with J.A. Achimaju Solicitors and Advocates.

After her service year, she returned to Ibadan and joined Chief Niyi Akintola & Co., practising law for two decades and in 2011 established her own law firm in Sango, Ibadan.

On 27 May 2013, Fadeyi was sworn in as a Judge of the High Court of Oyo State by Governor Abiola Ajimobi. She has served in different judicial divisions, including Ibadan, Ogbomosho, and Igboora.

She is a Fellow of the Chartered Institute of Mediators and Conciliators (ICMC) and the Nigerian Institute of Chartered Arbitrators (NICArb).
