= Musibau Babatunde =

Nigerian economist and educationist

Prof. Musibau Adetunji Babatunde

Commissioner for Budget and Economic Planning, Oyo State
- Incumbent
- Assumed office 2023
- Governor: Seyi Makinde

Personal details
- Born: Oyo State, Nigeria
- Education: University of Ibadan
- Occupation: Politician, educationist, economist

Musibau Adetunji Babatunde is a Nigerian economist, educationist, and public official who serves as the Commissioner for Budget and Economic Planning in Oyo State.

== Education ==
Babatunde earned his first degree in Economics from the University of Ibadan. He continued his postgraduate studies at the same institution, completing both his master's and doctoral programmes. His master's programme concluded with him being named the best graduating student.

== Career ==
He has taught in the Department of Economics at the University of Ibadan, where he advanced through academic ranks and was promoted to professor in 2021.

In 2019, Babatunde was appointed Chief Economic Adviser to Oyo State governor Seyi Makinde. In July 2023, his nomination as a commissioner was submitted to the Oyo State House of Assembly for confirmation. He was subsequently confirmed and appointed Commissioner for Budget and Economic Planning.

Babatunde received the African Economic Research Consortium (AERC), Nairobi, Collaborative PhD Scholarship Award for African Scholars.
