= Adeolu =

Adéolú is a Yoruba name and surname meaning "the crown or royalty of the Lord". It may refer to:

- Adéolú, mononym of Ade Olufeko, Nigerian-American designer and entrepreneur
- Adeolu Akande, Nigerian political scientist
- Funsho Adeolu, Nigerian actor and producer
- Jacob Adeolu Adekoya, Nigerian architect
- Oluwaseun Adeolu, foremost Nigerian interior design specialist
