= 2015 Oyo State gubernatorial election =

2015 gubernatorial election in Oyo State, Nigeria

- April 11, 2015
Nominee	Abiola Ajimobi	Rasheed Ladoja
Party	APC	A
Popular vote	327,310	254,520
Governor before election
Abiola Ajimobi
APC
Elected Governor
Abiola Ajimobi
APC

The 2015 Oyo State gubernatorial election occurred in Nigeria on April 11, 2015. APC candidate Abiola Ajimobi won the re-election after defeating Rasheed Ladoja of Accord.

Abiola Ajimobi emerged as the APC gubernatorial candidate after scoring 4,662 votes and defeating 3 other candidates: Ayobami Adesina, son of former governor of the state Alhaji Lam Adesina, and Adebayo Shittu, who is a former Commissioner for Justice and Attorney General in the state. Rasheed Ladoja was the Accord candidate.

== Electoral system ==
The governor of Oyo State is elected using the plurality voting system.

== Primary election ==
=== APC primary ===
The APC primary election was held on December 4, 2014. Abiola Ajimobi won the primary election, polling 4,662 votes against 3 other candidates.

=== Accord primary ===
Rasheed Ladoja won the primary election, polling 1,692 votes as the sole candidate.

== Results ==
Party candidates registered with the Independent National Electoral Commission to contest in the election.

Candidate	Party	Votes	%
Abiola Ajimobi	All Progressives Congress	327,310	36.38
Rasheed Ladoja	Accord	254,520	28.29
Adebayo Alao-Akala	Labour party	184,111	20.46
Teslim Folarin	People's Democratic Party	79,019	8.78
Seyi Makinde	Social Democratic Party	54,740	6.08
Total		899,700	100.00
Source: Premium Times
