= Adelabu =

Surname list

Adélabú is a name of Yoruba origin, meaning "the crown or royalty appears over large distances".

Notable people with the name include:

- Adebayo Adelabu (born 1970), Deputy governor, operations of the Central Bank of Nigeria and Oyo State gubernatorial candidate.
- Adegoke Adelabu (1915–1958), Nigerian politician
- Abu-Abdullah Adelabu (born 1964), Nigerian academic
