= Boyede Racheal Akintola =

Nigerian jurist

Hon. Justice Boyede Racheal Akintola

Judge of the High Court of Oyo State
- Incumbent
- Assumed office January 2006
- Appointed by: Rashidi Ladoja

Personal details
- Born: August 15, 1964 (age 62) Oyo State, Nigeria
- Education: LL.B Hons, University of Lagos

Boyede Racheal Akintola (born 15 August 1964) is a Nigerian jurist and a Judge of the High Court of Oyo State. She was appointed to the High Court bench in January 2006. She was also a Chief Magistrate in the Oyo State Judiciary.

== Early life and education ==
Boyede Racheal Akintola was born on 15 August 1964. She studied law at the University of Lagos from 1983 to 1986, graduating with a Bachelor of Laws (LL.B) degree. She was called to the Nigerian Bar in 1987

== Career ==
=== Early Legal Career ===
Akintola started off her law career as a legal officer at the Federal Mortgage Bank in Ibadan during the course of her National Youth Service Corps programme. She also worked as junior counsel at J.B. Lawson & Co. in Ibadan before joining the public service as state counsel in the Ministry of Justice of Old Oyo State, rising to senior state counsel.

=== Magistracy ===
In 1992, Akintola transferred to the Oyo State Judiciary as Senior Magistrate Grade II. She served in various magisterial districts, she became a chief magistrate in 2005.

=== High Court judge ===
On 5 January 2006, she was sworn in as a judge of the High Court of Oyo State by Rashidi Ladoja, the then governor of the state.

== Personal life ==
Akintola is married to Chief Adeniyi Akintola, a Senior Advocate of Nigeria, former Oyo State House of Assembly member, and former Deputy Speaker of the House during the Third republic.
