= Adeniyi Akintola =

Nigerian politician and Lawyer

Chief Adeniyi Michael Akintola (SAN)

Deputy Speaker, Oyo State House of Assembly
- In office 1992–1993

Personal details
- Born: January 21, 1960 (age 66) Ido, Oyo State, Nigeria
- Education: University of Ibadan (LL.B, M.Sc)

Adeniyi Michael Akintola (born 21 January 1960) is a Nigerian lawyer and politician. A Senior Advocate of Nigeria (SAN), he is the principal partner of the law firm Niyi Akintola & Co and a Deputy Speaker of the Oyo State House of Assembly during the Third Republic.

== Early life and education ==
Akintola was born on 21 January 1960 in Ido, Oyo State. He had a stint as a mechanic apprentice, motor boy, and photographer's apprentice in Kaduna State in the early years of his life.

Akintola studied law at the University of Ibadan, obtaining an LL.B. in 1984. He was called to the Nigerian bar in 1986. Akintola also holds an M.Sc. in political science from the University of Ibadan.

== Legal career ==
Akintola began practicing law in 1986 and has featured in constitutional law and election petition suits. In 2001, he was conferred the rank of Senior Advocate of Nigeria.

=== Notable cases ===
- Akintola served as lead counsel for Rashidi Ladoja in Inakoju v. Adeleke (2007), in which the Supreme Court nullified Ladoja's impeachment and reinstated him as governor.
- In 2023, he was part of the legal team defending Bola Tinubu's election at the Presidential Election Petition Tribunal.

== Political career ==
=== Legislative service ===
In 1992, Akintola was elected to the Oyo State House of Assembly representing Ido Constituency. He served as Deputy Speaker until the assembly was dissolved following the military coup of November 1993.

=== Gubernatorial aspirations ===
Akintola contested the All Progressives Congress gubernatorial nomination in Oyo State in 2019 and 2023. In 2023, he withdrew from the primary, alleging irregularities in the delegate list.

== National service ==
Akintola was a delegate representing Oyo State at the 2014 National Conference. He also served on the Presidential Committee on the Review of the 1999 Constitution.

== Personal life ==
Akintola is married to Justice Boyede Racheal Akintola, a judge of the High Court of Oyo State.
