= Iyabo Subulade Yerima =

Nigerian jurist

Hon. Justice Iyabo Subulade Yerima

Chief Judge of Oyo State
- Incumbent
- Assumed office 25 April 2023
- Appointed by: Seyi Makinde
- Preceded by: Munta Abimbola

Personal details
- Born: September 8, 1958 (age 67) Ibadan, Oyo State, Nigeria
- Education: Obafemi Awolowo University (B.A.), University of Buckingham (LL.B)

Iyabo Subulade Yerima (née Akinloye) is a Nigerian jurist who currently serves as the Chief Judge of Oyo State.

== Early life and education ==
Iyabo Subulade Yerima was born on 8 September 1958 in Oje-Itutaba, Ibadan North East Local Government Area of Oyo State.

She attended Omolewa Nursery and Primary School in Oritamefa, Ibadan. For secondary education, she studied at St. Margaret’s Girls Secondary School in Ilesa and Ibadan Grammar School.

For A-level, she attended The Polytechnic, Ibadan. She earned a Bachelor of Arts in English and Philosophy from the University of Ife and a Bachelor of Laws from the University of Buckingham in the United Kingdom. She was called to the Nigerian bar in 1985.

== Career ==
Justice Yerima's law career started at the Faculty of Law, University of Ife, where she completed her mandatory National Youth Service Corps from 1985 to 1986. She began her legal career in Kaduna State, completing training at Baba Amartey & Co. She then established her private practice, Yerima & Co. (Barristers & Solicitors), in Zaria, Kaduna State.

In June 2001, Yerima was appointed a judge of the High Court of Oyo State. She served in various judicial divisions and held positions including chairman of the Sub-Committee on Non-Custodial Sentencing.

Following the retirement of Justice Munta Abimbola, Yerima was sworn in as Acting Chief Judge of Oyo State on 16 January 2023. Her appointment was confirmed by the Oyo State House of Assembly, and she was sworn in as Chief Judge on 25 April 2023 by Governor Seyi Makinde.
