= Oyo State Traffic Management Authority =

The Oyo State Road Traffic Management Authority (OYRTMA) is a governmental agency responsible for regulating and managing road traffic within Oyo State, Nigeria.

== History and operations ==
OYRTMA was established by the enactment of the Oyo State House of Assembly on the November 4, 2009 to enhance road safety and ensure compliance with traffic laws under the jurisdiction of the Oyo State Government.

In October 2024 the agency impounded 41 vehicles tor offenses such as driving against traffic, operating illegal garages, and causing obstructions on major roads in Ibadan.

In 2024, the agency launched its 'Ember Months' campaign in Ibadan for accident-free roads during the high-traffic festive period. The campaign involved collaborations with the Park Management System (PMS), National Drug Law Enforcement Agency (NDLEA), and other agencies to promote road safety awareness and enforce traffic laws.

== Controversies ==
In May 2025, a tragic incident occurred during a joint traffic enforcement operation involving OYRTMA and the Nigeria Police Force. A police officer allegedly fired a shot aimed at the tire of a vehicle violating traffic rules, but the bullet struck and killed a teenager inside the car. The incident sparked public outrage and led to calls for a thorough investigation.
