= Abiodun Aderemi Fadeyi =

Nigerian politician

Deputy Speaker of the Oyo State House of Assembly
- Incumbent
- Assumed office 2019
- Constituency: Ona-Ara

Personal details
- Party: Peoples Democratic Party
- Occupation: Politician

Abiodun Aderemi Fadeyi is a Nigerian politician. He currently serves as the State Representatives representing Ona-Ara constituency at the Oyo State House of Assembly. He serves as Deputy Speaker.
