= Oyo State College of Nursing and Midwifery =

Nigerian medical college

Oyo State College of Nursing
- Type: University
- Established: 1949
- Students: 1,110
- Location: Eleyele, Ibadan, Oyo State, 200283, Nigeria
- Campus: Urban
- Website: oysconme.edu.ng

The Oyo state college of Nursing and Midwifery is a nursing college in Ibadan, Oyo State, Nigeria. It was established in 1949.

== History ==
The college of nursing and midwifery was founded in 1949. It resulted as a merge between the Oyo State School of Nursing, and the Oyo State School of Midwifery (established in 1954), through an act passed by the Oyo State House of Assembly in 2005. The college officially started on March 7, 2014, with a campus in Kishi, which offers basic midwifery.

The school had her first convocation for about 900 students in 2019, after nine years hiatus.

== Structures and departments ==
- Registry
- Academic library
- Administrative blocks
- Midwifery department
- Nursing department

=== Courses in Nursing ===
- Higher National Diploma
- Post Basic Nursing

== Admission ==
Upon writing JAMB, the school offer courses on nursing and midwifery.
