= Dahud Sangodoyin =

Nigerian politician and academic

Dahud Sangodoyin is a Nigerian statistician, academic and politician, and currently serves as Commissioner for Energy and Mineral Resources, Oyo State.

== Education ==
Sangodoyin obtained his bachelor's degree( BSc), master's degree (MSc) and doctoral degree (PhD) in Statistics from the University of Ibadan and he was the first lecturer to be promoted to the rank of full professor of statistics at the University of Botswana.

== Career ==
Sangodoyin was once a lecturer at the University of Ibadan before he relocated to Botswana where he was also teaching.

Sangodoyin was actively involved in the gubernatorial campaign of the Oyo state governor, Seyi Makinde coordinating the Omi Titun Initiative in Diaspora for Makinde.

In 2019, he was appointed as commissioner of Education in the Ministry of Education, Science and Technology. In January 2020, he was redeployed to the Ministry of Establishment where he served as Commissioner for Establishment and Training. By December 2023, he was again moved to the Ministry of Public Works, Infrastructure and Transport.

In 2023, during the second-term administration of the Oyo state governor, Seyi Makinde he served as the Commissioner for Energy and Mineral Resources, Oyo State.
