= Sharafadeen Alli =

Nigerian lawyer and politician

Sharafadeen Abiodun Alli
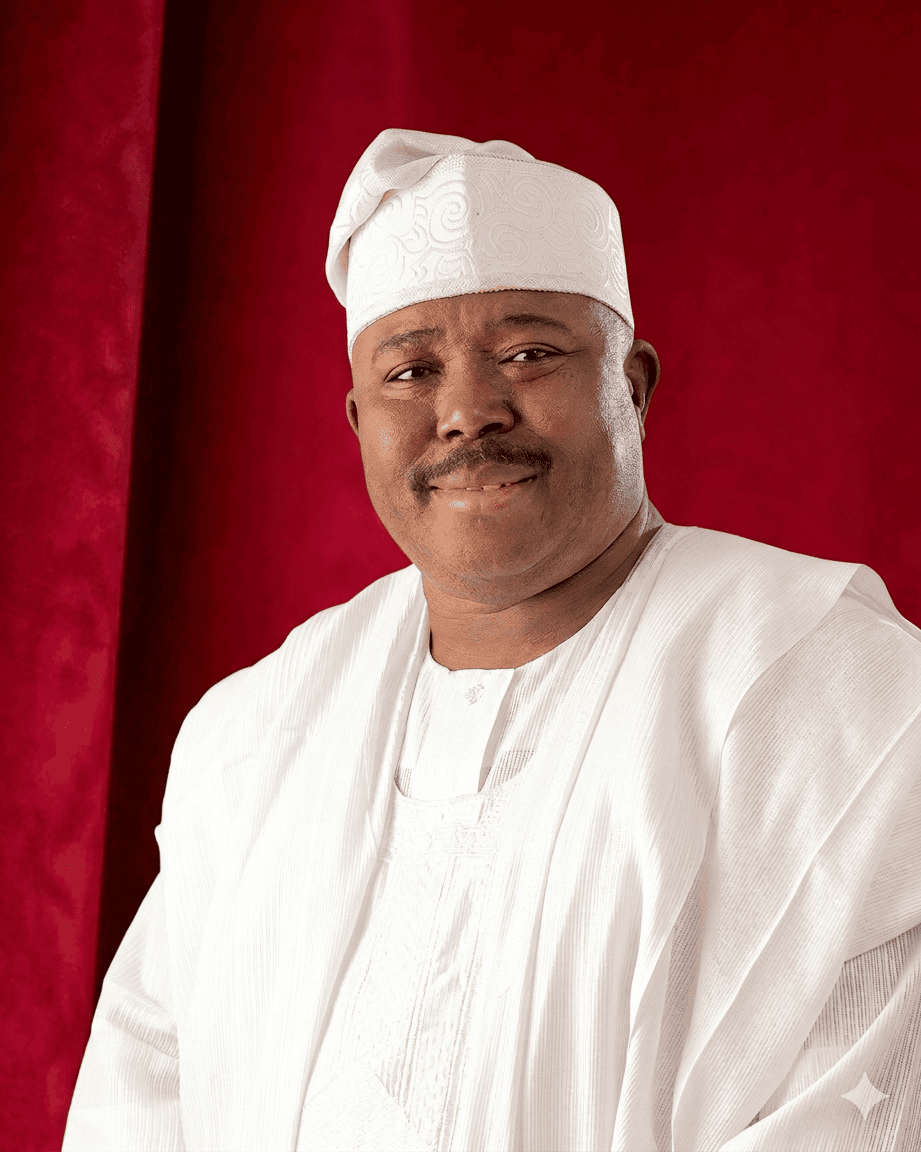
- Senator Sharafadeen Abiodun Alli

Senator for Oyo South
- Incumbent
- Assumed office 13 June 2023

Personal details
- Born: 20 April 1963 (age 63) Ibadan, Oyo State, Nigeria
- Party: APC
- Other political affiliations: Labour Party, PDP
- Education: University of Ibadan; Nigerian Law School; Federal University, Lokoja
- Profession: Lawyer, politician
- Website: sharafadeenalli.ng

Sharafadeen Abiodun Alli, popularly known as BSA, is a Nigerian lawyer and politician born on April 20, 1963. He currently represents Oyo South Senatorial District in the 10th National Assembly (NASS). Alli is involved in public service and community development. He is currently contesting to be the Oyo State Governor under the APC.

== Early life and education ==
Sharafadeen Abiodun Alli was born on April 20, 1963, in Ibadan, Nigeria, to the Olofiere Family in the Mapo area of Ibadan. He grew up at N4/224A Oke Aremo in Ibadan North local government. His educational journey began at the Progressive Day School in Alaadorin, Isale-Osi, Ibadan. He then proceeded to Anwaru-Islam (Ahmadiyya) Grammar School in Eleyele, Ibadan, where he obtained his W.A.S.C. 'O' level certificate. Later, he attended Ilesha Grammar School in Ilesha, Osun State, to pursue his W.A.S.C. 'A' Level HSC Certificate. For his tertiary education, Alli proceeded to the University of Ibadan, where he bagged a Bachelor of Law Degree (LL.B.) in 1986. The following year, he attended the Nigerian Law School on Victoria Island. Following his undergraduate studies, Alli returned to the University of Ibadan, where he pursued a Master's Degree in Law He holds a Doctorate Degree, PhD in Legislative and Strategic Studies at the Federal University Lokoja, Kogi State, Nigeria.

== Political career ==
Between December 1991 and November 1993, Alli became the first elected Executive Chairman of the most populous council in Oyo State, the Ibadan North Local Government. In 1996, at age 33, he was elected to represent Oyo South Senatorial District under the now-defunct United Nigeria Congress Party (UNCP), though he was not sworn in due to Military intervention. From September to November 1999, Alli served as the Oyo State Secretary and Acting Chairman of the People's Democratic Party (PDP).

In 2003, he was appointed as the Secretary to the State Government (SSG) under Governor Rashidi Ladoja of Oyo State, and in 2005, he became the Chief of Staff to the State Government. In 2011, Alli was appointed Chairman of the Odu'a Investment Company Limited. During his tenure, the company achieved several milestones, including the construction of Heritage Mall and Cocoa Mall in Ibadan. In 2015, he ran for Deputy Governor as a Labour Party candidate, partnering with the late Otunba Alao Akala as the gubernatorial candidate.

In 2023, Alli contested and won the Oyo South Senatorial District Election under the All Progressives Congress (APC), receiving 111,513 votes. He also served as the Chairman of the Senate Committee on the Independent National Electoral Commission (INEC) and Vice Chairman of the Senate Committee on Customs Excise and Tariff. Presently, Alli is the chairman Senate Committee on Agricultural Colleges and Institutions.

In 2024, Alli was inaugurated as a member of the 6th Legislature of Economic Community of West African States (ECOWAS) Parliament in Abuja by Nigerian President and Chairman of the ECOWAS Authority of Heads of State and Government, Bola Ahmed Tinubu.

Ahead of the 2027 Oyo State gubernatorial election, Alli became the All Progressives Congress consensus candidate and on September 4, 2026, the State chapter of the party unveil him as the Oyo governorship candidate alongside other candidates in the state.
