= Joseph Olasunkanmi Tegbe =

Nigerian civil servant

Joseph Olasunkanmi Tegbe (born 21 March 1966) is a Nigerian engineer, public administrator, and policy strategist. He is the Director-General of the Nigeria–China Strategic Partnership and was nominated in April 2026 by President Bola Ahmed Tinubu as Nigeria’s Minister of Power, subject to Senate confirmation.

== Early life and education ==
Joseph Tegbe was born on 21 March 1966 in Oyo Town, Oyo State, Nigeria, with ancestral roots in Ibadan.

He attended St. Mary’s RCM School, Oyo, and Federal Government College, Ogbomosho, before proceeding to Obafemi Awolowo University (formerly University of Ife), where he obtained a first-class degree in Civil Engineering.

He later attended executive programmes at Lagos Business School, INSEAD, and Harvard institutions.

== Career ==
=== KPMG career ===
Tegbe spent a significant part of his professional career at KPMG, where he rose to become Senior Partner and Head of Advisory Services for KPMG Africa.

At KPMG, he led advisory engagements across fiscal policy reform, governance systems, institutional transformation, and investment strategy.

He also served as Partner and Head of Technology Advisory and Markets at KPMG Nigeria, and was involved in cybersecurity, public sector, and telecommunications advisory across Africa.

During his consulting career spanning over three decades, Tegbe advised governments, multinational corporations, and public institutions on economic reforms, regulatory frameworks, and large-scale transformation projects.

Earlier in his career, he worked at Shell Petroleum Development Company as Head of Materials Accounting.

=== Public sector and policy roles ===
Following his private-sector career, Tegbe transitioned into public policy and advisory roles.

He currently serves as Director-General and Global Liaison for the Nigeria–China Strategic Partnership, coordinating bilateral development initiatives between Nigeria and China.

In 2025, he was appointed Chairman of the National Tax Policy Implementation Committee, tasked with overseeing the implementation of Nigeria’s tax reforms.

He has also contributed to policy development through engagements with institutions such as the Nigerian Economic Summit Group.

== Ministerial nomination ==
In April 2026, President Bola Ahmed Tinubu nominated Tegbe as Nigeria’s Minister of Power following the exit of Adebayo Adelabu.

The nomination is part of broader efforts to strengthen reforms in Nigeria’s electricity sector, improve grid stability, and attract investment.

== Professional affiliations ==
Tegbe is a Fellow of the Institute of Chartered Accountants of Nigeria (ICAN) and the Chartered Institute of Taxation of Nigeria (CITN).
