= Democratic Leadership Alliance =

- Abbreviation: DLA
- Chairperson: Barr. Samuel M. Memeh
- Secretary: Grace E. Obekpa
- Founded: 5, February 2026
- Headquarters: No. 25 Niger Street, Sun City Estate, Galadimawa, Abuja.
- Slogan: Securing Our Future

Website
- https://dlanigeria.org

Democratic Leadership Alliance (DLA) is a political party in Nigeria. It was registered by the Independent National Electoral Commission (INEC) on 5 February 2026 after completing the commission's registration and verification process for political associations seeking recognition as political parties conducted by the electoral body.

The Democratic Leadership Alliance was among the two political parties subsequently registered by the commission ahead of the 2027 Nigerian general elections.

== Leadership ==
INEC's current record for the party lists Barrister Samuel M. Memeh as national chairman. Other national officers listed by the commission include Grace E. Obekpa as national secretary, Anene N. Mirian as national treasurer, Umar Shehu Aliyu as national financial secretary and Barrister Aghwaretoma O. Fortune as national legal adviser.

The party held its maiden national convention in Abuja on 13 May 2026.

== Political positions ==
The DLA political programme focused on institutional reform, leadership development, economic production, science and technology, agriculture, national unity and accountability.

The DLA unveiled Moses Olusoji Adebisi as the presidential candidate of the party after the voluntary withdrawal of Samuel Memeh.

INEC's final list of presidential candidates for the 16 January 2027 election identifies Moses Olusoji Adebisi as the presidential candidate of the DLA and Nafisat Usaku Abubakar as his running mate.

== Political activities ==
In August 2026, the DLA inaugurated a National Campaign Council ahead of the 2027 general elections.

The DLA also participated in an August 2026 meeting involving opposition political parties discussing possible cooperation ahead of the 2027 general election.
