= Irepo =

- LGA
- Interactive map of Irepo
- Country: Nigeria
- State: Oyo State
- Headquarter: Kisi

Government
  - Local Government Chairman and the Head of the Local Government Council: Sulaiman Lateef Adediran (PDP)

Area
  - Total: 984 km^{2} (380 sq mi)

Population (2022)
  - Total: 173,300
  - Density: 171.5/km^{2} (444/sq mi)
- Time zone: UTC+1 (WAT)
- Postal code: 212

Irepo is a Local Government Area in Oyo State, Nigeria. Its headquarters are in the town of Kisi.

It has an area of 984 km^{2} and a population of 122,553 at the 2006 census.

The royal title of Kisi Kingdom is Iba of Kisi.

The name of Iba of Kisi is Oba Moshood Oyekola Aweda Lawal Arowoduye II

The postal code of the area is 212.
