= Kisi, Oyo State =

Town in Oyo state, Nigeria

Kisi Kishi-Okeogun
- Town
- Nickname: Kishi ọmọ Adasobo
- Location in Nigeria
- Coordinates: 9°05′N 3°51′E
- Country: Nigeria
- State: Oyo State
- LGA: Irepo

Government
  - Iba of Kisi.: Oba Masoud Oyekola Aweda Lawal Arowoduye II

Population
  - Total: 155,510
- Time zone: UTC+1 (WAT)

Kisi (or Kishi) is a large town in Oyo State, Nigeria. It is the headquarters of the Irepo Local Government Area. Kishi, is located at the northern part of Oyo State. Kisi is very close to old Katunga which collapsed in the 18th century as a result of Jihad activity by the Hausa/Fulani of Ilorin, Kwara State. Kisi is reputed as a town whose people were never conquered or defeated in battles, hence many people from old Oyo migrated and settled in Kishi during and after the Fulani Jihadist invasion. Kisi is about 240 km from Ibadan, the capital city of Oyo state, and about 200 km and 110 km from Oyo Alaafin and Ilorin respectively.

The town has an official post office.

== History ==
Historically, different tribes such as the Baruba, Yoruba, Nupe had been in existence in Kisi since the 13th century. According to some oral traditions, the first inhabitant in a place called "Igbo-Ifa" was Kilisi Yerumo, a Baruba man. Subsequently, two Yorubas joined Kilisi Yeruma and ardently supported him in the formation of the town. Later, the place was named "Kilisi", the name of the first inhabitant. After the omission of the letters "l" and "i", it remains Kisi. This is the origin of the town's name. However, the modern version of spelling the town's name, Kishi, is still revolving round the original name. Today the name is either written as Kisi or Kishi, with the later deemed as the preferred version by the elite.

For sociopolitical expediency, Kishi is often found in most official documents e.g the Borgu Kingdom official website data, the National data bank on towns and villages, Highway codes of Federal Ministry of Works and National Vehicle Identification by the Federal Road Safety Commission.

== Traditional institution ==
The traditional political structure of Kisi consists of Iba of Kishi as the supreme leader, the Iba-in-Council with Chiefs, lieutenants and king makers with offices such as the Ajana, Agoro, Laha, Ajagunna, Atipa, Ikolaba, Balogun and Iyalode.

== Traditional festivals ==
The popular traditional festival in Kisi is the Adasobo/Gaani and other cultural festivals including hunting expeditions (Igbe Adasobo) and the international Cultural Show of Kisi dual origin of Yoruba and Bokobaru.

== Economics ==
The progress and development of a particular village, town, city, state or nation depends on the total amount of commitment to economic expansion and development. Rahim Sulayman (2000) found that the main occupation of Kisi people is farming. The economic progress is determined by the farm produce. The major farm produce includes yam, maize, and guinea-corn. The blacksmiths also play a key role because they produce hoes, cutlass and other farm equipments. The produce are exported to other cities like Lagos, Ilorin, the capital city of Kwara State, and Ibadan, the capital city of Oyo state.

Today, the town has a strong commitment to economic advancement of Oyo state. It is known as the "Food basket of Oyo state".

== Community development ==
Kishi is known for community development initiatives or the public participation often called ‘Build and Transfer’ (BaT) to the government. Few amongst these ‘Build and Transfer’ are the first Secondary School in Kishi baptized as “Kishi Community Grammar School established in 1976, Kishi Police Station 1969, Kishi Post Office, Kishi Muslim Hospital established in 2009 (now, an affiliate of the University of Ilorin Teaching Hospital), Kishi School of Nursing established in 2016, Kishi Fire Service Office in 1980 among others. All these establishments were later transferred to either the state or federal government in the name of public participation. Kishi also houses the old Oyo National park.

== Religion ==
In a research conducted by Ahmad Tijani Surajudeen and Muhammad Zahiri (2011), it was shown that Kisi, has three predominant religions: traditional, Christianity, and Islam.

The traditional religion from Oyo-Ile reached the town in 1820. The traditionalists celebrate various festivals such as Egungun, Sango, Iyemaja and others.

Through Joseph Ladipo in 1910, Christianity reached the town. The first place of worship was First Baptist Church, located very close to Are Ikobe's house, Ajegunle Area, Kisi. The second place of worship was constructed in 1950. Today, there are a significant number of churches in Kishi.

Islam reached Kisi through a popular Oloyoyo family in 1868. Later, Teefa's family was influenced by Oloyoyo's family. Both families propagated Islam in the town and its environs. The area where Oloyoyo's family resides is called Isale-Imole, a name that has two meanings. The first meaning is an area where the religion of Mali came from. The reason for this meaning is because of the direct link of West African Islam with Timbuktu, Mali. The second meaning is that, Imole is from Imo-lile i.e. difficult knowledge. Islamic knowledge is considered difficult because of its Arabic inscription in understanding the Qur'an.

More so, the arrival of an Islamic scholar, Abdullah bn al-Malik, in 1894, was significant in the historicity of Islam in Kisi. This scholar influenced the conversion of the then king, Adewale Ariwajoye, to Islam which has a positive influence on the citizens' acceptance of Islam. Islam has been well-grounded in the town today and the Muslims are the majority in the town.

== List of Ibas in order of succession ==
1. Kilishi Yerumo (The Founder)
2. Iba Adetoye
3. Oluwaye Opadijo
4. Asala Lagogodo
5. Akangbe Ologini Igbe
6. Lagbulu Arojojoye (The Great)
7. Ayinla Janta Folawiyo
8. Abubakare Adewale Folawiyo Ariwajoye I
9. Bello Atoyebi Egunjobi Arowoduye
10. Oderinde Gbadembi Adebimpe
11. Adesina Afolabi Lawan
12. Alhaji Yusuf Owoade Ariwajoye II
13. Alhaji Mas'oud Aweda Oyekola Lawal Arowoduye II (who has been on the throne for over 24 years, since August,1997).
