= Adeolu Akande =

Nigerian political scientist

- Born: Otu, Itesuwaju Local Government, Oyo State, Nigeria
- Education: University of Ibadan
- Scientific career
- Fields: Political Science, comparative Politics
- Workplaces: University of Ibadan; Nigerian Tribune; The Punch; Office of the Vice President of Nigeria; Office of the President of Nigeria; Oyo State Government; Igbinedion University

Adeolu Akande is a native of Otu in Itesuwaju Local Government of Oyo state and also a Nigerian political scientist and professor of Political Science at the Igbinedion University, Okada, Edo State.

== Education ==
He obtained his university degree in 1987, his MSc in 1990, and a doctoral degree in political science in 1997, all from the University of Ibadan.

== Career ==
Akande started as a graduate assistant at the University of Ibadan upon receiving his master's degree. He then worked as a journalist for several news outlet in Nigeria, such as the Nigerian Tribune and The Punch between 1991 and 1999. Following that, he returned to academia at his alma mater's political science department. Akande was appointed deputy chief press secretary of Vice President Atiku Abubakar in 2001. In 2003, Akande became special assistant for research and communication strategies to President Olusegun Obasanjo.

In 2011, Akande was selected as the chief of staff of the Oyo State governor, Senator Abiola Ajimobi. Ajimobi relieved Akande and other members of the state cabinet of their duties in 2013. Akande was appointed Professor of comparative politics by Igbinedion University in July 2017.
