= Allied Peoples Movement =

Political party in Nigeria

- Abbreviation: APM
- Leader: Yusuf Mamman Dantalle
- Chairman: Yusuf Mamman Dantalle
- Founded: August 2018
- Registered: 15 August 2018
- Headquarters: Abuja, Nigeria
- Ideology: Progressive politics
- Colors: White, Green, Gold
- Senate: 0 / 109
- House of Representatives: 0 / 360
- Governors: 2 / 36

Allied Peoples Movement (APM) is a registered political party in Nigeria. The party was registered as a political party by the Independent National Electoral Commission in August, 2018. The party endorsed President Muhammadu Buhari as its candidate in the 2015 Nigerian general elections.

In July 2026, Seyi Makinde was announced as the presidential candidate of Allied Peoples Movement for the 2027 Nigerian general elections.
