= Hazeem Gbolarumi =

Nigerian politician (born 1957)

His Excellency Hazeem Gbolarumi

Deputy Governor of Oyo State
- In office 23 January 2006 – 7 December 2006
- Governor: Adebayo Alao-Akala
- Preceded by: Adebayo Alao-Akala
- Succeeded by: Adebayo Alao-Akala

Personal details
- Born: Hazeem Gbolarumi; 4 March 1957 (age 69) Ibadan, Southern Region, British Nigeria (now in Oyo State, Nigeria)
- Party: People’s Democratic Party (PDP)
- Occupation: Politician; lawyer

Hazeem Gbolarumi (born 4 March 1957) is a Nigerian lawyer and politician who served as deputy governor of Oyo State from January to December 2006. He served as State Chairman of the People’s Democratic Party (PDP) in 2003. He is the current gubernatorial candidate of the People’s Democratic Party in Oyo State.

== Background and education ==
Hazeem grew up in Ibadan in an average home. His mother was a trader in Agbeni market, Ibadan, and his Father was the assistant general manager of Peugeot Automobile in Kaduna. He did his secondary education at Timi Agbale Grammar School, Ede.

After leaving office as deputy governor in 2006, he studied law at the University of Ibadan. He later obtained a Master of Laws (LL.M.) degree in the United Kingdom and also holds an Honorary Doctorate Degree in Strategic Management (Honoris Causa) from Houdegbe North American University, Republic of Benin.

== Career ==
Gbolarumi began his career in the university environment, where he was Personnel Secretary in the Department of Agricultural Economics, University of Ibadan, from 1986 to 1987.

In 1987, he established Gasab Continental Nigeria Limited, where he has served as Chairman and Chief Executive Officer since its inception. He also started Olugbesan Farms Nigeria Limited, an agricultural enterprise focused on agribusiness development and production. Currently, he leads Market Guide Communications, where he is the Chairman and Publisher, overseeing media and publication.

=== Politics ===
Hazeem entered politics in 1979; he started during the Unity Party of Nigeria (UPN) era and later joined the Social Democratic Party (SDP), where he served as State Secretary.

He was later appointed secretary of the Ibadan Municipal government during the military era, before it was divided into many other local government areas.

By 1993, he became State Secretary of the Social Democratic Party (SDP). He later served as the State Chairman of the Peoples Democratic Party (PDP) during the former governor Rashidi Ladoja’s administration in 2003/2004. In 2006, he was selected as the running mate to Christopher Adebayo Alao-Akala and emerged as the deputy governor of Oyo state.

Beyond elective offices, Gbolarumi has also been appointed to some notable public offices. Between 2009 and 2011, he served as Chairman of the Board of Directors of the Federal Medical Centre, Ido-Ekiti.

In 2026 was sworn in as a Notary Public of Nigeria alongside 21 other legal practitioners by the Chief Judge of Oyo State, Iyabo Yerima.

In May 2026, Hazeem emerged as the governorship candidate of the People's Democratic Party (PDP) in Oyo State ahead of the 2027 general election. He scored a total of 3,615 votes across all 33 Local government Areas to defeat his only opponent, Beulah Adeoye, who polled 22 votes.

As part of his 2027 election campaign, he unveiled a humanitarian and justice-focused agenda that includes the provision of legal and social support for indigent inmates, particularly those unable to afford legal representation or secure bail. He also pledged to strengthen human rights protection mechanisms and promote the rehabilitation and reintegration of vulnerable persons within correctional facilities.

== Awards and recognitions ==
- Award of Excellence (Outstanding Political Actor) from The Kenad Communication Network
- Oyo State Civil Service Merit Awardee (2006)
- Hamir Hajj Recognition, Oyo State (2006)
- Grand Patron, Nigeria Union of Journalists (Information Chapel) (2006)
- Patron, Obafemi Awolowo Hall, University of Ibadan
- Pillar of Support Award, Shooting Stars Sports Club (3SC)
- The Mayor of Democracy Award by Golden Pictures Communications Ltd.
- Political Icon of the Year (2008), Nigeria Union of Journalists (NUJ), Oyo State Council
- Grand Patron, National Union of Barbers, Oyo State

== Personal life ==
Hazeem married two wives on the same day and has six children, whom he claims are all lawyers.
