= Egbeda =

- LGA and town
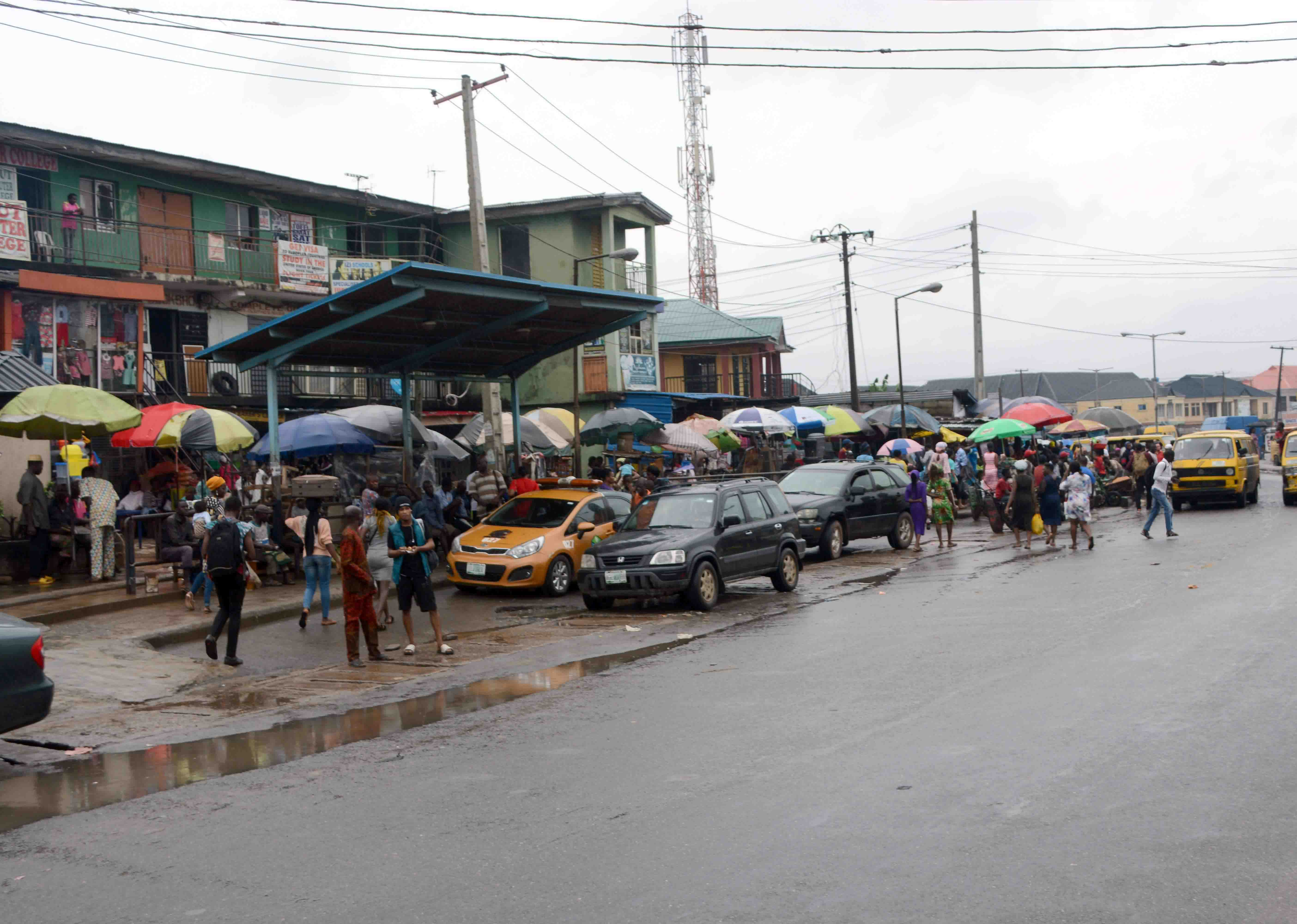
- Egbeda bus stop
- Interactive map of Egbeda
- Location within Nigeria
- Coordinates: 7.3813°N 3.9665°E
- Country: Nigeria
- State: Oyo State

Government
  - Local Government Chairman and the Head of the Local Government Council: Oyedele Sikiru Sanda (PDP)

Area
  - Total: 191 km^{2} (74 sq mi)

Population (2006)
  - Total: 281,573
  - Density: 1,470/km^{2} (3,820/sq mi)
- Time zone: UTC+1 (WAT)

Egbeda is a Local Government Area in the senatorial district of Oyo Central in Ibadan, Oyo State, Nigeria. Egbeda local government was carved out Lagelu Local government in 1989. The postal code of the area is 200109

== Demographics ==
It has an area of 191 km^{2} and a population of 281,573 at the 2006 census.

== Government ==
Egbeda local government area is subdivided into 11 wards: Erunmu, Ayede/Alugbo/Koloko, Owo Baale/Kasumu, Olodan/Ajiwogbo, Olodo/Kumapayi I, Olodo II, Olodo III, Osegere/Awaye, Egbeda, Olode/Alakia, and Olubadan Estate.

The Local Government is headed by an elected chairman and 11 councillors elected from each ward.

The current traditional ruler is the Elegbeda of Egbeda, Oba Victor Sunday Olatunde Okunola who is also a member of the Oyo State of Council of Obas and Chiefs.

== Economy ==
The commercial sector in Egbeda is thriving, and the region is home to multiple marketplaces, such as the Bola Ige international market, where residents of the local government area and its surrounding areas congregate to exchange a wide range of goods and services. A major economic activity in Egbeda Local Government Area is farming, where huge amounts of crops like cocoa, coconut, and cocoyam are farmed. Additionally, there is a dry seaport in the LGA at Erunmu.

== Climate/ Geography ==
The hottest month is March and the coolest month is August. The average temperature in Egbeda fluctuates from low to high season.

The two main seasons experienced by the 191 square kilometre or 74 square mile Egbeda Local Government Area are the dry and the wet seasons. The area's average temperature is 28 degrees Celsius or 82.4 degrees Fahrenheit, and its average wind speed is 12 km/h (7.5 mph).
