= Ido, Nigeria =

Ido
- Town and LGA
- Interactive map of Ido
- Country: Nigeria
- State: Oyo State

Government
  - Local Government Chairman and the Head of the Local Government Council: Hon. Sheriff Aderemi Adeojo

Area
  - Total: 986 km^{2} (381 sq mi)

Population (2022)
  - Total: 152,520
  - Density: 155/km^{2} (401/sq mi)
- Time zone: UTC+1 (WAT)
- Postal code: 200

Ido is a town and Local Government Area in Oyo State, Nigeria.

It has an area of 986 km^{2} and a population of 152,520 at the 2022 census. Ido Local Government was among the five in Ibadan district before it was cancelled in 1956. Other four Local Governments that were in existence at that time were Mapo, Akinyele, Ona-Ara and Olode-Olojumon. Mapo was the headquarters for all the Local Governments by then, which was called Ibadan City Council (ICC).

In respect of the state administration policy of bringing government and development to the grassroots level, and in response to the yearning and aspirations of the people, Ido Local Government finally came into being in May, 1989. The Local Government, with its headquarters at Ido, was carved out of the former Akinyele Local Government. The area was referred to as Akinyele West Local Government (1981–1983) during the second Republic before it was merged again with Akinyele Local Government by the Buhari/Idiagbon regime in 1984. The Local Government has an area of 986 km^{2} (244,000 acres; 381 sq mi) and a total population of 103,261 based on 2006 National Population Census. The current population is estimated to have grown to 152,520 based on 2022 population census data.

The council was administered under the sole administrator-ship system from May to July 1989 and Caretaker Committee system from July 1989 to December 8, 1990. With the formation of the two political parties, Social Democratic Party (SDP) and National Republican Convention (NRC), the administration of Ido Local Government was handed over to democratically elected leaders. Ido Local Government covers the area spanning Apata, Ijokodo, Omi-Adio, Akufo and Apete. It shares boundaries with Oluyole, Ibarapa East, Akinyele, Ibadan South-West and Ibadan North-West Local Governments in Oyo State and Odeda Local Government in Ogun State. The council formerly has six wards, which had been increased to ten for easy exercise of franchise. Among the major towns within the local Government Area are Ijokodo, Odo-Ona, Gbekuba, Ido, Elebu, Omi-Adio, Apata, Apete, Akufo and Bakatari as well as about 612 villages which include Ogunweide, Dada, Elenusonso, Aba Ido, Aba Egba, Ologiri, Logudu, Olowofela, Apooyin, Oderemi, Odetola, Erinwusi, Mowunni, Tade, Alagbaa, Iku-senla, Aloko among others. On the account of extensive fertile soil, which is suitable for agriculture, the basic occupation of the people is farming. There are large hectares of grassland which are suitable for animal rearing, vast forest reserves and rivers. People in the area grow varieties of cash crops such as cocoa, kola nut, palm oil, timber and food crops such as maize and rice. The area is also suitable for a wide range of edible fruits. In fact, Ido Local Government can serve as the ”food basket of the state” if well utilized.

== Early development ==
The area has also gained tremendously from industrialization process with the presence of industries such as the defunct Nigerian Wire and Cable Ltd, Nigerian Mining Corporation at Omi Adio and the NNPC among others. Ido Local government benefits greatly from recent infrastructural developments in Oyo State state such as the construction of Theophilus Akinyele Way, formerly known as Akala Express road, Lagos to Ibadan railway tracks, Ibadan ring road, and the controversial Ibadan Circular Road named after Oba Rasheed Adewolu Ladoja, the current Olubadan of Ibadan land.

The Local Government area has over 75 primary schools, 33 secondary schools - made up of 18 junior secondary schools and 15 senior secondary schools.
