= Teslim Folarin =

Nigerian politician (born 1963)

Teslim Folarin OFR
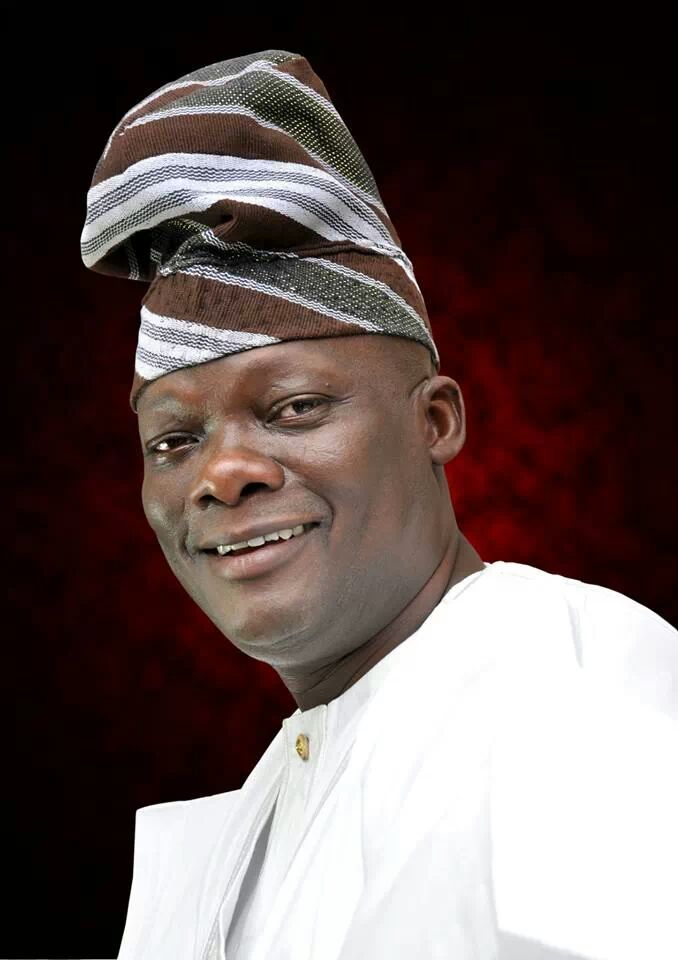
- Folarin in 2014

Senator for Oyo Central
- In office 11 June 2019 – 11 June 2023
- Preceded by: Monsurat Sunmonu
- Succeeded by: Yunus Akintunde
- In office 3 June 2003 – 6 June 2011
- Preceded by: Lekan Balogun
- Succeeded by: Ayoade Ademola Adeseun

Personal details
- Born: 30 October 1963 (age 62) Ibadan, Western Region (now in Oyo State), Nigeria
- Party: All Progressive Congress (2017–present)
- Other political affiliations: Peoples Democratic Party (1998–2017)
- Spouse: Angela Folarin (died 2022)
- Education: Methodist Boys' High School, Lagos
- Alma mater: University of Ibadan (B.Sc. (Hons)); Harvard University
- Occupation: Politician

Teslim Kolawole Folarin OFR (born 30 October 1963) is a Nigerian politician, he was the gubernatorial candidate of the All Progressives Congress in Oyo State for the 2023 gubernatorial election which he lost to the incumbent governor Seyi Makinde. He previously served as the senator representing Oyo Central senatorial district from 2003 to 2011; and from 2019 to 2023.

== Early life and education ==
Teslim Kolawole Folarin was born on 30 October 1963, to Alhaji and Alhaja Hamzat Folarin. He stemmed from Baale House in Oja Igbo area of Ibadan North-East Local Government area of Oyo State. Folarin is the Head (Mogaji) of his family House and a ranked traditional Chief in Ibadanland. He is the Laguna Olubadan of Ibadanland.

Folarin attended primary school in Lagos; his secondary education was completed at Nigeria's premier secondary school, Methodist Boys' High School, Lagos. Folarin holds a B.Sc. (Hons) degree in political science from the University of Ibadan and a diploma degree from Harvard University, USA. He spent some years gathering valuable civil service experience in the UK, including management roles at the Department of Trade in London before returning to Nigeria in 2002. Folarin performed his obligatory NYSC tenure in Kaduna and joined politics thereafter.

== Political career ==
Folarin contested and won the senatorial seat to represent Oyo Central in 2003 at the age of 39 on the platform of the PDP and was re-elected for a second term in 2007 on the platform of the same party. Folarin remains the only legislator in Oyo State who has served two terms at the Senate. At the Senate, he was appointed Leader of the Senate. Folarin also served on the Senate Committee on Business & Rules, Marines and Transport although his particular interests were in education, power supply and water resources. Folarin was involved in the Power probe in 2008. As the Leader of the Senate, he led debates on all Executives Bills and sponsored several private Bills himself. These included the Insurance Act, Armed Forces Pension Act and several others.

Folarin won the gubernatorial ticket of his party, Peoples Democratic Party (PDP) in 2014. He lost the election to the incumbent Governor Senator Abiola Ajimobi of the All Progressives Congress.

Folarin defected to the opposition party All Progressives Congress in December 2017.

Folarin was elected as the All Progressives Congress (APC) Oyo Central senatorial candidate in September 2018.

Folarin won the senatorial position in the 2019 Oyo central senatorial district election defeating the incumbent senator, Mrs. Monsurat Sunmonu and other candidates. He was the Chairman of the Senate Committee on Local Content in the 9th Senate. He also sits on several other committees including National Intelligence, INEC, Interparliamentary, Constitutional Review, Finance, Sustainable Development Goal (SDG) and Airforce.

Folarin contested in the 2023 Oyo State gubernatorial election on the platform of All Progressives Congress but lost to the incumbent Governor Seyi Makinde of the Peoples Democratic Party (PDP).

Following APC's presentation of Senator Sharafadeen Alli as its 2027 Oyo State governorship candidate at a ceremony in Ibadan on 2 July 2026, Folarin did not participate in the primary process and, in July 2026, joined fellow senators Bayo Adelabu and Abdulfatai Buhari and former deputy governor Rauf Olaniyan in a joint statement pledging to "work closely with other stakeholders" to deliver Oyo State for President Bola Tinubu's re-election in 2027, without endorsing Alli's candidacy. The Oyo Rising Citizens Forum condemned the statement as "hypocritical" and reflecting "divided loyalty," accusing the four politicians of refusing to accept Alli's emergence as the party's candidate. On 21 July 2026, President Tinubu met with Folarin at the Presidential Villa in Abuja in an effort to rally him behind Alli's candidacy and unite the party's Oyo State stakeholders ahead of the February 2027 election, with a source telling The Punch that Tinubu had promised Folarin's allies would be included in power-sharing arrangements at the state and federal levels.

== Controversy ==
In 2011, Folarin, and three others were charged with a murder of trade union activist Lateef Salako.

== Personal life ==
Folarin was married to Barr. Angela Folarin until her death in 2022, they had children.
