= Adebayo Adelabu =

Federal Minister of Power of Nigeria

Adebayo Adelabu OFR
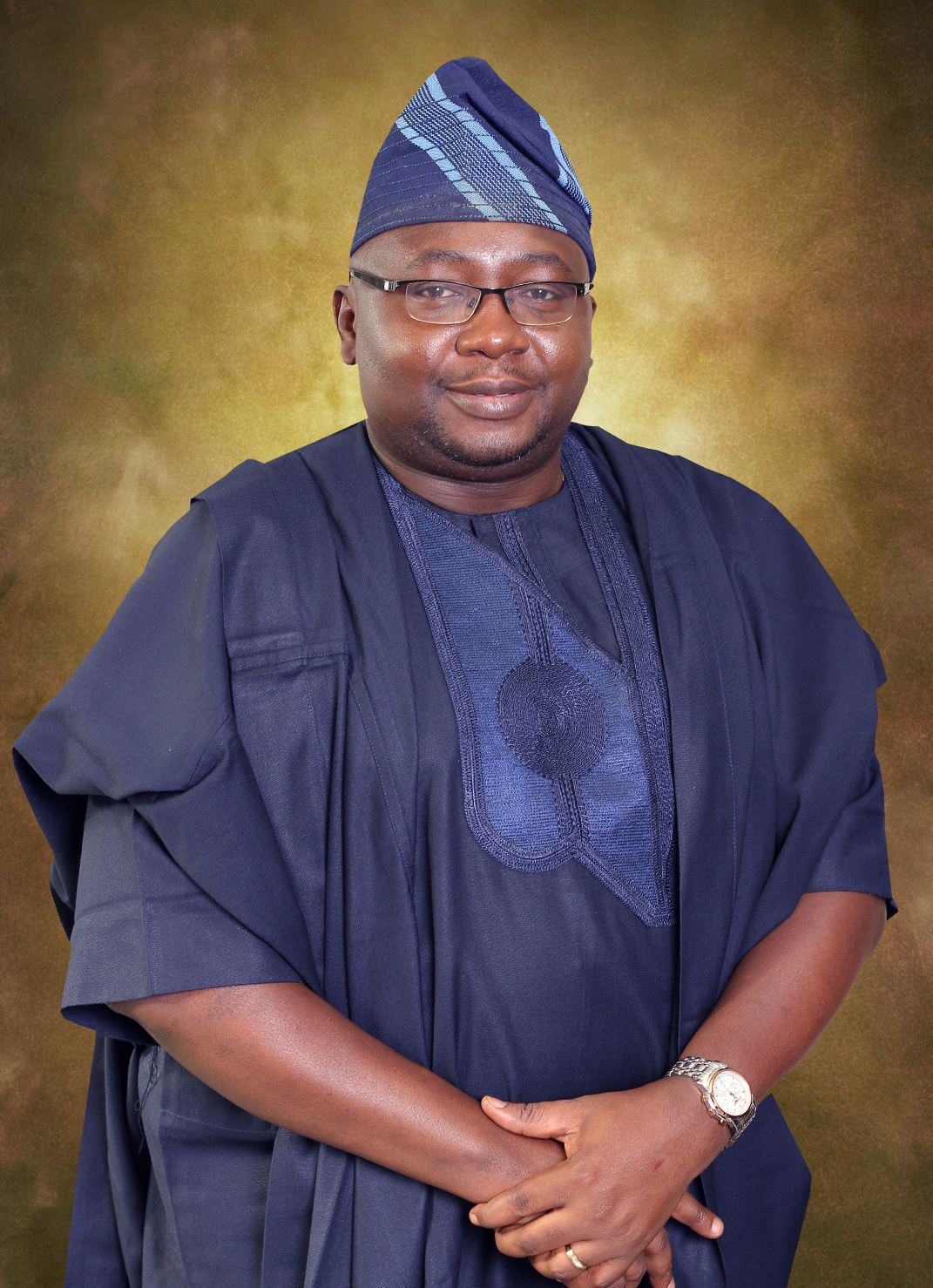
- Adebayo Adelabu

Federal Minister of Power
- In office August 21, 2023 – April 22, 2026

Deputy Governor Operations, Central Bank of Nigeria
- In office April 9, 2014 – May 24, 2018
- Preceded by: Tunde Lemo
- Succeeded by: Ade Sonubi

Personal details
- Born: Adebayo Adekola Adelabu; 28 September 1970 (age 56) Ibadan, Oyo State, Nigeria
- Party: APC
- Education: Lagelu Grammar School, Ibadan; Obafemi Awolowo University; Harvard Business School, Boston, USA
- Website: https://penkelemes.com.ng/

Adebayo Adelabu OFR (born September 9, 1970) is a former deputy governor, operations of the Central Bank of Nigeria who served as the Federal Minister of Power of Nigeria. He resigned on April 22, 2026. He was also an Oyo State gubernatorial candidate for the All Progressives Congress in 2019.

== Early life and education ==
Adelabu was born to Aderibigbe Adelabu of Oke-Oluokun compound, Kudeti Area in Ibadan. His grandfather is Adegoke Adelabu.

Adelabu attended Ibadan Municipal Government primary school, Agodi Ibadan from 1976 to 1982 and Lagelu Grammar School, Ibadan from 1982 to 1987.

Adelabu received a first class degree in Accounting from Obafemi Awolowo University, Ile-Ife. He is a Fellow of the Institute of Chartered Accountants of Nigeria (ICAN), a Fellow of Chartered Institute of Bankers of Nigeria and an Associate Member of the Institute of Directors of Nigeria and the United Kingdom. Adelabu has also taken up professional courses in various business schools, including Harvard, Stanford, Wharton, Columbia, Kelloggs, Euromoney, and the University of London.

== Professional career ==
Adelabu started his career with PriceWaterhouse (now PricewaterhouseCoopers), an international firm of chartered accountants and management consultants. During his seven years with the firm, he led and managed various audit and consultancy engagements for large banks and non-bank financial institutions within and outside Nigeria.

He was on secondment to the Central Bank of Nigeria for one year in 1999 when he led the finance team on the CBN re-engineering and corporate renewal project tagged "Project EAGLES". He left the firm in year 2000 as an audit manager and senior consultant to join First Atlantic Bank as the Financial Controller and Group Head of Risk Management and Controls. He was later promoted to Chief Inspector of the Bank in 2002 and Group Head of National Public Sector Business in 2003.

Adelabu moved to Standard Chartered Bank as the West African Regional Head of Finance and Strategy (Consumer Banking Business) with dual offices in Lagos and Accra. He was there till 2009 from where he became an Executive Director/Chief Financial Officer (CFO) of Nigeria's largest bank, First Bank of Nigeria Plc. (FBN) at the age of 39.

Adebayo was appointed by former President Goodluck Ebele Jonathan in February 2014 as Deputy Governor, Operations of the Central Bank of Nigeria (CBN).

Adelabu serves as the Chairman, Board of Directors of the Nigeria InterBank Settlement Systems (NIBBS) and has chaired the board of Financial Institution Training Centre (FITC). He is also a serving member of the Board of Federal Inland Revenue Services (FIRS), Nigeria Security Printing and Minting Company (NSPMC), the Assets Management Corporation of Nigeria (AMCON) and the Nigeria Incentive-Based Risk-Sharing System for Agricultural Lending (NIRSAL).

== Personal businesses ==
Adelabu is also a businessman and has investments spanning the hospitality, entertainment, agriculture and real estate industries. He is the Group Chairman of Bayse One Group of Hotels, the Best Western Plus Hotels, Ibadan and Bayse One Farm.

== Political life ==
Adelabu resigned from Central Bank Nigeria with the intention of seeking election into the governorship position of Oyo State in 2019. He made his intention official on June 20, 2018, when he visited the All Progressive Congress party secretariat in Ibadan to make his declaration and also pick up the governorship aspirant form. On September 30, 2018, he emerged as the gubernatorial candidate for the APC (All Progressives Congress) Party in Oyo State at the party primaries held at the Lekan Salami Stadium in Ibadan where contestants Joseph Tegbe, Niyi Akintola and four others withdrew from the race with some pledging their unwavering support to Mr Adelabu. On March 9, 2019, Adelabu lost to Oluwaseyi Makinde of the People Democratic Party in the 2019 Oyo gubernatorial election in Oyo state. In 2022, he resigned from the All Progressive Party (APC) and defected to Accord party after he lost the primary election to Teslim Folarin who emerged as the APC gubernatorial candidate. He emerged and contested for the Governor of Oyo state under the umbrella of Accord Party after the previous candidate Ayodele Oyajide stepped down.

On July 27, 2023, Adelabu was included in President Bola Ahmed Tinubu's 28-man ministerial nomination.

He was made minister of power by president Bola Tinubu on August 16, 2023. Adelabu resigned from office as a Federal Minister of Power on April 22, 2026.

Former minister of Power, Bayo Adelabu, lost the APC gubernatorial primary election after securing 19,193 votes behind Senator Buhari who secured 37,265 votes finishing second. The contest was eventually won by Senator Sarafadeen Alli, a senator representing Oyo South Senatorial district in the National Assembly who was declared as the party's flagbearer with 578,143 votes.

In July 2026, following his loss to Senator Sharafadeen Alli in the APC governorship primary in Oyo State, Adelabu denied reports that he was planning to defect to the Allied People's Movement (APM) ahead of the 2027 general elections. In a statement issued by his media aide, Femi Awogboro, Adelabu described as "false and unfounded" claims that his personal assistant, Ajiboye Akande, had met with APM members to facilitate his defection, and affirmed that he remained "a committed member of the APC" who continued to regard President Bola Tinubu as his political mentor.
