= Oyo State House of Assembly =

Legislative arm of government of Oyo State of Nigeria

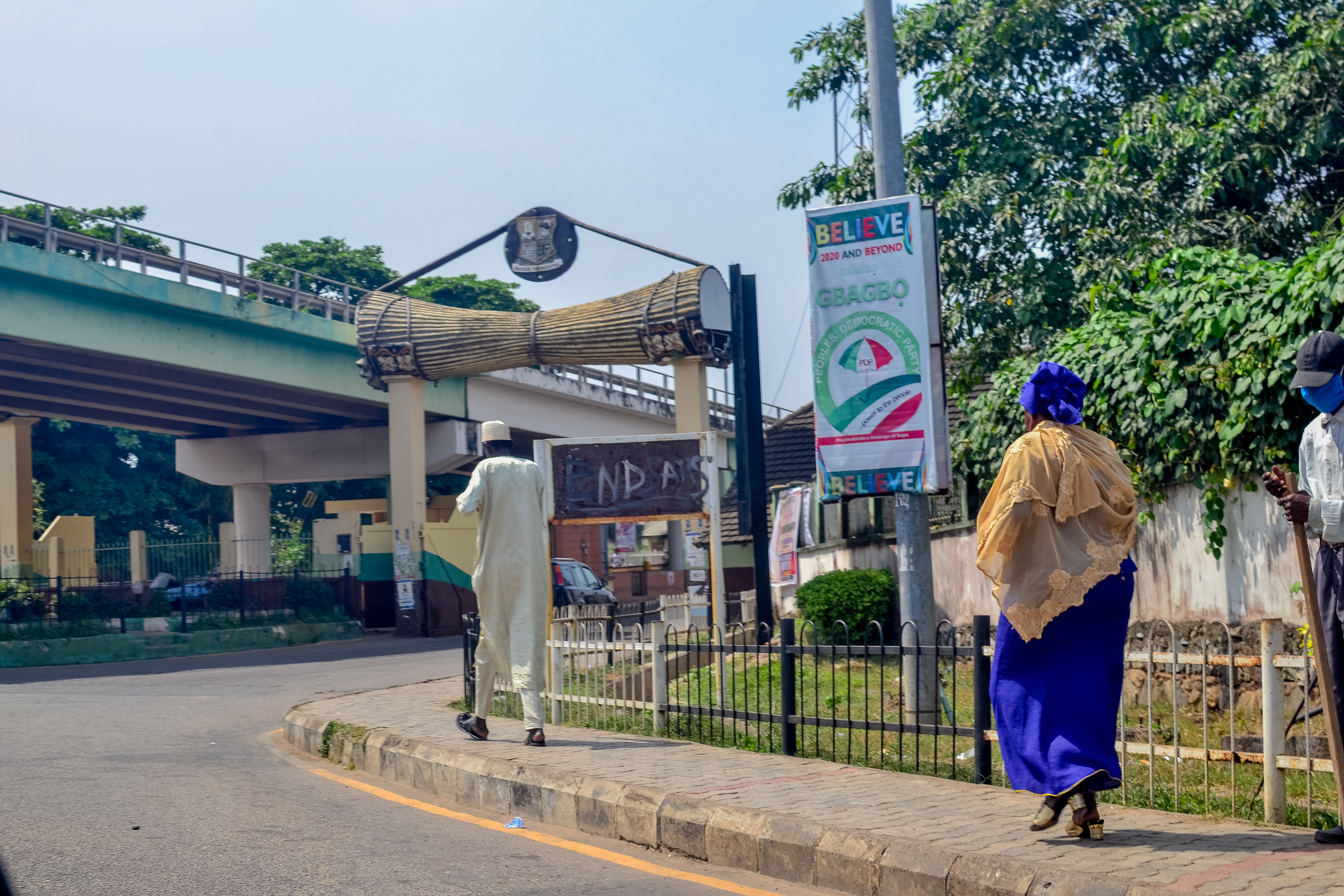
Oyo State Government house gate, Ibadan.

The Oyo State House of Assembly is the legislative arm of the government of Oyo State of Nigeria. It is a unicameral legislature with 32 members elected from the 33 local government areas of the state with two local government having a shared member.

The fundamental functions of the Assembly are to enact new laws, amend or repeal existing laws and oversight of the executive. Members of the assembly are elected for a term of four years concurrent with federal legislators (Senate and House of Representatives) and governor of the state. The state assembly convenes three times a week (Tuesdays, Wednesdays and Thursdays) in the assembly complex within the state capital, Ibadan.

The current speaker of the Assembly is Adebo Ogundoyin.
