= Abiola Ajimobi =

Nigerian politician (1949–2020)

Governor of Oyo State
- In office 29 May 2011 – 29 May 2019
- Deputy: Moses Alake Adeyemo
- Preceded by: Adebayo Alao-Akala
- Succeeded by: Seyi Makinde

Senator for Oyo South
- In office 3 June 2003 – 5 June 2007
- Preceded by: Peter Olawuyi
- Succeeded by: Kamorudeen Adekunle Adedibu

Personal details
- Born: Isiaka Abiola Adeyemi Ajimobi; 16 December 1949 Oja'ba, Ibadan, Southern Region, British Nigeria (now in Oyo State, Nigeria)
- Died: 25 June 2020 (aged 70) Ikoyi, Lagos, Nigeria
- Party: All Progressives Congress (2013–2020)
- Other political affiliations: Action Congress of Nigeria (before 2013)
- Spouse: Florence Ajimobi (m. 1980)
- Children: 5
- Education: State University of New York; Governors State University
- Occupation: Politician
- Website: www.abiolaajimobi.org

Isiaka Abiola Adeyemi Ajimobi // (16 December 1949 – 25 June 2020) was a Nigerian politician who served as governor of Oyo State from 2011 to 2019, he was the first person elected to the office twice.

He was formerly the Managing Director/Chief Executive Officer of the National Oil and Chemical Marketing Company, a subsidiary of Shell Petroleum, Nigeria. He left the oil sector in 2002 after 26 years of meritorious service and was elected in 2003 as a Senator of the Republic of Nigeria representing Oyo South Senatorial District on the platform of the Alliance for Democracy (AD). After one term in the senate, he contested in 2007 for the governorship seat of Oyo state under the banner of the All Nigeria People's Party, a bid which he lost. He contested again in the April 2011 gubernatorial elections under the Action Congress of Nigeria and was elected Governor of Oyo State in a closely contested vote. In 2019, he was succeeded by Engr. Oluwaseyi Makinde. After leaving office, he contested the Senate seat of his senatorial district but lost. In June 2020, he was confirmed to have contacted COVID-19 and was announced dead on 25 June.

== Early life ==
Isiaka Abiola Adeyemi Ajimobi was born on 16 December 1949 to the Ajimobi family of Ibadan at Oja-Iba, Ibadan. Oyo State. He started his education at Saint Patricks Primary School, Oke-Padre in Ibadan. He completed his primary education at Ibadan City Council Primary School, Aperin. His secondary school education was at Lagelu Grammar School.

Ajimobi's university education was at the United States of America, where he studied Business Administration and Finance at the State University of New York, in Buffalo, New York graduating with a Bachelor of Science degree. His MBA was in Operations Research and Marketing with a concentration in Finance at Governors State University, University Park, Illinois.

== Political career ==
In 2003, Abiola Adeyemi Ajimobi became a Senator of the Republic of Nigeria. Ajimobi was a principal officer in the Senate, serving as the Deputy Minority leader of the Senate. In 2007, Ajimobi contested the gubernatorial election under the umbrella of the All Nigeria Peoples Party but lost. Ajimobi contested again in 2011 under the Action Congress of Nigeria and won.

Known as the Architect of the Modern Oyo State, Ajimobi contested for second term in an election that took place on 11 April 2015 under the All Progressives Congress for re-election and won. In the event of his re-election into office as the Governor, Ajimobi became the first person to occupy the seat twice and in succession. He was declared the winner of the Oyo State gubernatorial election by the Independent National Electoral Commission.

Ajimobi was elected as the All Progressivse Congress Oyo South senatorial candidate on 28 September 2018. He lost in the 2019 senatorial elections to Kola Balogun of Peoples Democratic Party.

On 16 June 2020, he was appointed as the acting national chairman of the All Progressives Congress (APC) by the National Working Committee (NWC) of the party.

== Personal life and death ==
In 1980, Ajimobi married Florence Ajimobi; they had five children.

On 19 June 2020, Ajimobi was admitted to First Cardiologist and Cardiovascular Consultants Hospital in Lagos after slipping into a coma following COVID-19 complications during the COVID-19 pandemic in Nigeria. He was declared dead on 25 June 2020.
