= Seyi Makinde =

Nigerian politician and engineer (born 1967)

His Excellency Seyi Makinde

Governor of Oyo State
- Incumbent
- Assumed office 29 May 2019
- Deputy: Rauf Olaniyan (2019–2022); Bayo Lawal (since 2022)
- Preceded by: Abiola Ajimobi

Personal details
- Born: Oluseyi Abiodun Makinde; 25 December 1967 (age 58) Ibadan, Western State (now in Oyo State), Nigeria
- Party: Allied Peoples Movement
- Spouse: Tamunominini Makinde
- Children: 3
- Parents: Olatubosun Makinde (father); Abigail Makinde (mother)
- Education: University of Lagos
- Occupation: Politician; engineer

Oluseyi Abiodun Makinde (born 25 December 1967) is a Nigerian engineer, businessman, and politician who has served as the governor of Oyo State since 2019.

He is an engineer and a subject matter expert on fluid and gas metering. He is the group managing director of Makon Group Limited; an indigenous oil and gas company in Nigeria. He established his first oil and gas private business called Makon Engineering and Technical Services, (METS) at the age of 29 in the year 1997, after earning years of work experience with international oil and gas companies.

Makinde had contested for the 2015 Oyo State gubernatorial election on the platform Social Democratic Party (SDP) but lost.

== Early life and education ==
Makinde was born to a teacher turned accountant, Pa Olatubosun Makinde, and Abigail Makinde of Aigbofa Compound in Oja'ba, Ibadan, Oyo State. He is the third child of the family. Makinde began his education at St Paul Primary School and completed his primary education at St Michael Primary School, Yemetu, Ibadan. His secondary education was at Bishop Phillips Academy, Monatan, Ibadan. In 1985, he gained admission to the University of Lagos (Unilag) where he earned his bachelor's degree in Electrical Engineering.

In 1998, Makinde trained at Industrial Control Services in Houston, Texas on Safety Shutdown System; and Development of Analytical Competence for Managing Operations at Lagos Business School (now Pan-Atlantic University) in 1999. In 2000, he had training in automation. In 2002, he studied Fundamentals of Crude Sampling at Jiskoot Auto Control Training Centre, Kent, England. Also, in 2005, he studied Understanding and Solving Complex Business Problems at Massachusetts Institute of Technology (MIT), USA.

== Professional and business career ==
Makinde was deployed for his compulsory national youth service (NYSC) to Shell Petroleum Development Company (SPDC) of Nigeria, where he was later engaged as a pupil engineer. He served in different capacities; handling and partaking in several key projects between 1990 and 1992. From 1992 to 1997, he worked as a field Engineer (Eket operations) for Rebold International Limited and in 1995, he was appointed as Field Manager in the same company.

In 1997, Makinde established his first business, Makon Engineering and Technical Services Limited (METS), after working for five years (1992-1997) with various international oil and gas companies (IOCs), as the Engineering Manager. He is now the group managing director of Makon Group of Companies.

Makinde is a member of national and international professional bodies notably: Nigerian Society of Engineers (NSE), Council for Regulations of Engineering in Nigeria (COREN), Oil and Gas Design Engineers of Nigeria (OGDEN), International Society of Automation (ISA), Institute of Measurement and Control UK; and American Measurement Institute (AMI).

== Political career ==
In 2007, Seyi Makinde contested for the Oyo South Senatorial seat under the platform of the All Nigeria Peoples Party (ANPP) but lost to the People's Democratic Party candidate- Kamoru Adedibu. Makinde remained undeterred by his first failed attempt and in 2010; under the People's Democratic Party, PDP, he aspired for the Oyo South 2011 Senatorial seat but lost the primary to the incumbent Oyo South Senator.

In 2014, Makinde aimed for the Oyo State 2015 governorship ticket under the platform of the People's Democratic Party (PDP). In December 2014, upon the conclusion of the party's primary election, he was denied the governorship nomination ticket. Makinde however, remained true to his ambition and defected to the Social Democratic Party (SDP), under which platform he contested for the Oyo State 2015 SDP gubernatorial candidate, but came out 3rd having garnished over 50,000.

In September 2017, the Caretaker National Chairman of PDP, Senator Ahmed Makarfi visited him in Ibadan and following extensive, deep and wide consultations with National Leaders, Oyo State leaders and elders of the Social Democratic Party, and cross sections of strategic partners within Oyo State, Engineer Seyi Makinde returned to his former political party, People's Democratic Party (PDP). He maintained that joining the PDP was not for personal gains but for the development of the State by finding lasting solutions to the array of problems facing the State.

On 29 September 2018, Makinde emerged as the gubernatorial candidate of the People's Democratic Party (PDP) for the 2019 general elections for Oyo State, after polling 2772 votes at the primary election that took place at liberty stadium, Oke-Ado in Ibadan.

On 9 March 2019, Makinde polled 515,621 votes defeating his closest rival, Adebayo Adelabu of the All Progressive Party who polled 357,982 votes. The All Progressives Congress (APC), during the General elections. Makinde was elected into the Office of the Governor of Oyo State at the 2019 Gubernatorial elections for Oyo State which held on 9 March 2019.

Makinde on 29 May 2019 was sworn in as the 28th executive Governor of Oyo State. Makinde takes over from Late Senator Abiola Ajimobi after the latter's eight years in office.

On 7 April 2022, Makinde declared his intention of run for another four years as clamored by the good people of Oyo State due to his ground breaking achievements since resuming office in 2019. He made this declaration in a message posted on his social media channels stating that "if the people of Oyo state desire it, we will serve four more years".

Makinde contested in the 2023 general election in his bid for reelection as the governor of Oyo state in March 18, he won the election polling the highest votes to beat his closest rival Teslim Folarin of the All Progressive Congress (APC) and Adebayo Adelabu of Accord

He was declared the winner and governor elect for Oyo state on 19 March by the Independent National Electoral Commission (INEC) having met and satisfied all the requirements by the law.

On 30 May 2026, Oyo State Governor, Seyi Makinde emerged as the presidential candidate of the Allied People’s Movement ahead of the 2027 general election.

In August 2026, the APM/PDP alliance backing Makinde's 2027 presidential bid launched a nationwide registration drive for "National Volunteers and Reset Agents," which organisers said drew interest from Nigerians across all 36 states, the Federal Capital Territory, and the diaspora. The volunteer and Reset Agent platforms were described as cross-party initiatives intended to promote the "Reset Nigeria Agenda," a policy framework organisers characterised as a roadmap for national renewal through institutional reform, economic revitalisation, improved security, healthcare, education, power supply, job creation, and infrastructure development.

== Awards and recognitions ==
- Nigerian Union of Journalists (Oyo State Council)-Laudable Contribution to Humanity Merit Award.
- National Association of Oke-Ogun Students (Ibadan)-Merit Award.
- Fiditi Grammar School (Oyo State)-Old Student Merit Award in appreciation to the commitment, dedication and service to the association and humanity.
- Junior Chamber International (JCI) University of Calabar Chapter.-Entrepreneurial Excellence Award.
- Sports Writers Association of Nigeria (Oyo State Chapter)-Gold Merit Award for immense and invaluable contribution to sports development.
- Nigerian Association of Social Workers Merit Awards (Oyo State Chapter)-Philanthropic gestures and contribution to Social Care Delivery Services.
- CCII National Merit Award.
- Federal Radio Corporation of Nigeria (Ibadan) - awarded Seyi "Astute Politician of the Year 2018" for his resilience with which he had continued to assist the less privileged in the society.

== Personal life ==
Makinde lives in Ibadan, Oyo State. He is married to Tamunominini Makinde, a Southern Nigerian by birth, and they have three children.

== See also ==
- List of governors of Oyo State
