= University of Notre Dame residence halls =

University residences in Indiana, US

There are 33 undergraduate residence halls at the University of Notre Dame as of 2025, including 17 male halls, 15 female halls, and one mixed community. Several of the halls are historic buildings which are listed on the National Register of Historic Places. Residence halls are the center of the student life and some academic teaching; most students stay at the same hall for most of their undergraduate studies. Each hall has its own traditions, events, mascot, sports teams, shield, motto, and dorm pride. The university also hosts Old College, an undergraduate residence for students preparing for the priesthood.

Notre Dame's undergraduate hall system has elements of a residential college system. All first-year students are placed in one of the 32 halls upon enrollment, and students rarely switch halls. Each hall has its own spirit, tradition, mascot, sport teams, events, dances and reputation. Approximately 80% of undergraduate students live on campus, and often a student lives in the same dorm for the entirety of their undergraduate career. Even students who move off campus tend to maintain strong bonds with their affiliated residence hall. Halls complete in intramural sports, and the interhall football between Notre Dame male dorms is the only intramural tackle football that has remained at any US university.

Each dorm has its own architectural features, some of which were designed by famous architects such as Willoughby J. Edbrooke, Maginnis & Walsh and Thomas Ellerbe, and each hall has a chapel dedicated to the hall's patron saint. With the exception of Carroll Hall, the residence halls are split among six main segments of the campus: Main (God) Quad, South Quad, North Quad, Mod Quad, West Quad, and East Quad. While Carroll is officially part of South Quad, it has its own lawn by Saint Mary's Lake informally called Far Quad due to its distance from the rest of the halls. All first-year students are not only guaranteed on-campus housing, but are required to reside on campus for at least six semesters, starting with the Class of 2022.

== List ==
Residence hall	Sex	Established	Quad	Capacity	Colors	Chapel	Architect	Mascot	Motto
Alumni Hall	Male	1931	South Quad	225	Green and white	St. Charles Borromeo	Maginnis & Walsh	Dawgs (ΔΩΓ)	Notre Dame by choice, Alumni Hall by the grace of God.
Badin Hall	Female	1917 (building dates to 1897)	South Quad	131	Green and white	St. Stephen	Columkille Fitzgerald, C.S.C.	Bullfrogs	Estote ratio (Be the reason)
Baumer Hall	Male	2019	West Quad	251	Burgundy and gold	St. Martin de Porres	Goody Clancy	Buccaneers	Per Ardua ad Spes (Through adversity to hope)
Breen-Phillips Hall	Female	1939	North Quad	162	Blue and pink	St. Francis of Assisi	Maginnis and Walsh	Babes	Land of the Free, Home of the Babes
Carroll Hall	Male	1967 (building dates to 1906)	Far Quad	102	Crimson and gold	St. André Bessette	Charles Harding, C.S.C.	Vermin	All are most welcome
Cavanaugh Hall	Female	1936	North Quad	211	Green and purple	The Holy Spirit	Maginnis and Walsh	Chaos	Embrace the Chaos
Coyle Hall	Male	2026	South Quad	258	Green and white	St. Paul	Mackey Mitchell Architects	The Crew	Faciam vos fieri piscatores hominum ("I Will Make You Fishers of Men")
Dillon Hall	Male	1931	South Quad	253	Red and black	St. Patrick	Maginnis and Walsh	Big Red	"Smartest, Strongest, Humblest" and "It's OK to be jealous"
Duncan Hall	Male	2008	West Quad	232	Green and navy	St. Walter of Pontoise	Mackey Mitchell Architects	Highlanders	Communitas, Fraternitas, Observantia (Community, Brotherhood, Respect)
Dunne Hall	Male	2016	East Quad	221	Green, Blue and Gray	Bl. Basil Moreau	Goody Clancy	Sentinels	Potentia Videre, Fortitudo Agere
Farley Hall	Female	1947	North Quad	215	Teal and yellow	St. John the Evangelist	Maginnis and Walsh	Finest	Come Share Life
Undergraduate Community at Fischer	Mixed			80					
Flaherty Hall	Female	2016	East Quad	226	Lavender and Navy	Mary Queen of Angels	Goody Clancy	Bears	Fortuna Audaces Juvat
Graham Family Hall	Male	2024	East Quad	262	Purple and Gold	St. Augustine	Mackey Mitchell Architects	Royals	Go and Do Likewise
Grojean Hall	Female	2026	South Quad	275	Pink and yellow	St. Theodore Guerin	Mackey Mitchell Architects	Penguins	Bloom Where You're Planted
Johnson Family Hall	Female	2020	East Quad	225	Blue and white	St. Teresa of Calcutta	Mackey Mitchell Architects	Valkyries	Wings Up, Ride Valks
Keenan Hall	Male	1957	North Quad	250	Navy and white	Holy Cross	Ellerbe Associates	Knights	Fratres in Christo
Keough Hall	Male	1996	West Quad	271	Blue and red	Our Lady of Guadalupe	Ellerbe Becket	Kangaroos	Brothers, Scholars, Champions
Knott Hall	Male	1988	Mod Quad	252	Orange and blue	St. Elizabeth Ann Seton	Ellerbe Associates	Juggerknotts	We are Knott Men
Lewis Hall	Female	1965	Main (God) Quad	269	Blue and yellow	St. Teresa of Ávila	Ellerbe Associates	Chicks	The Dome will lead you home
Lyons Hall	Female	1926	South Quad	182	Black and gold	All Souls'	Francis Kervick and Vincent Fagan	Lions	Benignitas, Indulgentia, Sacrificium
McGlinn Hall	Female	1997	West Quad	272	Green	St. Bridgit of Kildare	Ellerbe Becket	Shamrocks	Act Justly, Love Tenderly, Walk Humbly
Morrissey Hall	Male	1926	South Quad	188	Black and gold	St. Thérèse of Lisieux	Francis Kervick and Vincent Fagan	The Manor	Bonum Jucundumque Habitare Fratres
O'Neill Family Hall	Male	1996	West Quad	266	Blue, red, and silver	St. Joseph the Worker	Ellerbe Becket	Angry Mob	Fratres in Unum
Pasquerilla East Hall	Female	1981	Mod Quad	248	Red and black	St. Catherine of Siena	Ellerbe Associates	Pyros	No Pyro left behind.
Pasquerilla West Hall	Female	1981	Mod Quad	249	Purple and white	St. Clare of Assisi	Ellerbe Associates	Purple Weasels	Peace, Love, Pdub
Ryan Hall	Female	2009	West Quad	254	Aqua, navy, and white	St. Anne	Mackey Mitchell Architects	Wildcats	Ryan go Bragh
Siegfried Hall	Male	1988	Mod Quad	252	Maroon and gray	Our Lady, Seat of Wisdom	Ellerbe Associates	Ramblers	Hall of Champions
Sorin Hall	Male	1888	Main (God) Quad	143	Blue and gold	St. Thomas Aquinas	Willoughby J. Edbrooke	Otters	Frater Pro Fratre (Brother for Brother)
St. Edward's Hall	Male	1929 (building dates to 1882)	Main (God) Quad	154	Green and gold	St. Edward the Confessor	Edward Sorin, Charles Harding	Gentlemen	For Hall and King
Stanford Hall	Male	1957	North Quad	230	Green and gold	Holy Cross	Ellerbe Associates	Griffins	Auri Custos
Walsh Hall	Female	1909	Main (God) Quad	160	Navy and light blue	Our Lady of the Visitation	William J. Brinkman	Wild Women	Strong. Free. W.I.L.D.
Welsh Family Hall	Female	1997	West Quad	266	Light blue, navy, and salmon	St. Kateri Tekakwitha	Ellerbe Becket	Whirlwinds	Faith, Family, Friends

=== Defunct Residences ===
Residence hall	Sex	Quad	Capacity	Established	Disestablished	Nickname
Brownson Hall	Male	Main (God) Quad		1855 (named 1890)	WW2 (became office space)	Brownsonites
Carroll Hall (Old)	Male	Main (God) Quad		1850s? (named 1890)	WW2 (became office space)	Carrollites
Corby Hall	Male	Main (God) Quad		1895 (1899 as dorm)	1936 (became priests' residence)	He-Men
Fisher Hall	Male	South Quad	183	1952	2024 (demolished)	Green Wave
Flanner Hall	Male	Mod Quad	530	1969	1997 (became office space)	Gamecocks
Freshman Hall	Male	North Quad		1922	1932 (demolished)	
Grace Hall	Male	Mod Quad	520	1970	1996 (became office space)	Grace Lightning
Holy Cross Hall	Male	Far Quad		1968	1990 (demolished)	Hogs
Howard Hall	Female	South Quad	148	1925	2026 (became a "swing" residence hall)	Ducks
Pangborn Hall	Female	South Quad	175	1955	2024 (demolished)	Royals
Sophomore Hall	Male	North Quad		1923	1936 (demolished)	Fighting Sophs, Maroon Horde
Zahm Hall	Male	North Quad	176	1937	2021 (became a "swing" residence hall)	Ignats

== History ==
=== Origins (1843–1888) ===
When the first students arrived on campus in the fall of 1843, they all resided in a two-story brick building built by Sorin that spring, a building known today as Old College. In the fall 1844 the first main building (then called college building because it housed virtually the entire college) was constructed with the help of the architect Marsile of Vincennes. The structure was a four-story brick building eighty feet long by thirty-six feet wide, 4 1/2-story high with a small cupola (but not yet a dome) with a bell in it, in French style. The third floor housed both the student dormitories and the residences for priests and brothers; with additional dormitory space on the fourth floor. Two lateral wings (which gave the building the shape of an H) were opened in 1853. In 1865 this structure was replaced by the second iteration of the main building, which hosted student dormitories on its fourth and fifth floor. This building burned down in the great fire of 1879, but its successor, the current main building, was swiftly reconstructed and once again hosted most of the university's facilities, including student dormitories. By the mid-1880s, two lateral wings were added to each building to add dormitory space bringing the length of the building from 224 feet to 320. Like all incarnations before, these were open dormitory areas, with no private rooms. In the fall of 1890, the names of Carroll and Brownson Hall were given to dormitories in the west half and the east half of the main building respectively, and portraits of Orestes Brownson and Charles Carroll had been ordered to be placed in the respective halls. The 1892 Golden Jubilee history of the university stated that Carroll Hall was named after John Carroll, who was the first bishop in the United States.

=== Early years and growth (1888-1965) ===
Sorin Hall, erected in 1888, was the first dormitory built specifically to host students at the university. During the early mid-1880s, the Holy Cross priests experimented with private rooms for upperclassmen with high academic grades and the results were positive. Since the Main Building was overcrowded with students, Father Edward Sorin decided to build a freestanding dormitory to expand residential space for students and alleviate the housing shortage. It was the first of its kind among all Catholic universities and one of the first among colleges across the country.

As of 1891, juniors and seniors of the collegiate course were housed in Sorin Hall. Students between the ages of 13 and 17 were housed in Carroll Hall (west side of the main building), while those ages 17 and up were in Brownson Hall (east side). Students of different halls had little interaction outside of occasional shared classes. Pupils below 13, called the minims, had St. Edward's Hall to themselves and had their own facilities. Minims had little to no interaction with the other students.

Freshman Hall and Sophomore Halls were built in 1922 and 1923 to accommodate a large influx of students. Total college student enrollment had increased to 1,425 by 1921. Sources reported that between 600 and 1110 students lived off campus in 1922, which meant that the university was also losing revenue opportunity by not offering housing and board to such students. Additionally, administration was worried that off campus student would not be able to benefit from bonding with teachers and other students. These two buildings were meant to be temporary and were cheaply made. Freshman Hall was built for $39,600 and placed north of the Notre Dame Fieldhouse, roughly where Breen-Phillips is today, and run north to south. It was built to host 176 students in the summer of 1922, and it was constituted by a two-story white-frame building, 250 feet long and 45 feet wide. The interior walls were fiberboard while a single-story porch with four wood pillars was placed at the front of the dorm, giving an overall impression of a military barrack. Sophomore Hall was built for $69.000 in thirty-eight days in the summer of 1923. It was located east of St. Edward's Hall, running east to west. It faced the Gymnasium and was perpendicular to Freshman Hall. It was built to host 186 students in the summer of 1922, and it was a similar building to Freshman Hall, 300 feet long and 37 feet wide, and had a two-story porch. The two buildings were known as the Cardboard or Pasteboard Palaces because of their cheap construction. Occasionally, football players would run through the walls.

Long term permanent housing was also built to increase supply of on-campus housing to keep up with the quickly growing student population. Lyons, Howard and Morrissey Halls were built between 1924 and 1927 to alleviate the on-campus housing shortage due to the rapid increase in student population after World War I. In 1929, president Charles L. O'Donnell decided convert St. Edward's Hall, which until then had hosted the boarding school program for younger children, into an undergraduate residence hall (since the college population was growing and space badly needed), under the direction of professor and architect Vincent Fagan in June that year. The open dormitory was converted into double rooms, while the chapel was left untouched, and the new hall opened in September to house 207 undergraduates. Construction of Dillon and Alumni was part of an extensive building program aimed at improving educational and living facilities, and increasing supply of on-campus residential facilities.

In the 1940s, North Quad (Breen-Phillips, Cavanaugh, Zahm Hall, and Farley) housed freshman students and was also known as the Freshman Quad. The other dorms on the Main and South Quads, closer to classrooms and the dining halls, were reserved for upperclassmen.

=== Residential hall model ===
Up until the 1960s, the residence halls were based on academic class, with three or four halls for freshmen, three for sophomores, and others for juniors and seniors. This system was meant to develop strong class spirit, but many students started advocating for stay-halls, where students could remain in the same hall for their entire undergraduate career. Those in favor argued that this could lead to stronger hall spirit and more efficient hall government, with only a quarter of students turning over every year. The administration was initially against this for its perceived effect on the freshmen. They believed that new students needed special attention and regulation, such as earlier curfew and more rules, and in addition they did not want to disrupt freshmen accommodation at the same time as they were developing the new "first year of studies" program. Eventually administration experiment with the new system. In the fall of 1965, Dillon, Farley, and Alumni were the first dorms to try the "stay-hall" system. The experiment proved to be successful, but most other residence halls initially rejected it because they did not want to have freshmen living in their halls. In 1967, Zahm and Breen-Phillips also adopted the new system, and eventually all dorms were converted to the current residential college model, where all students are placed in one dorm freshman year and students rarely switch halls.

=== Modern expansion and renovation (1960s-) ===
Two large hall, Flanner and Grace, were constructed in 1969 at a combined cost of $6.9 million. These two halls, with their 11-stories and capacity for 530 students each, were much larger than previous halls. They also were among the first dorms to offer such amenities as kitchens on every floor, air conditioning, large weight rooms, and in-dorm food sales. Originally, 5 such towers were planned, together with a modernist chapel in Mod Quad, but only Flanner and Grace were ever built. Due to their huge size in student population, Flanner and Grace became known for their rowdiness and massive multi-story parties.

When women were first admitted into the university in 1972, Walsh and Badin were the first to be converted to female halls. Breen-Phillips and Farley were converted into female dorms in 1973, increasing the female population from 360 to 775. Lyons followed suit in 1974. Renovations for the transition to a women's dorm included increased storage facilities and more washing and drying equipment.

One major expansion of the halls occurred in the late 1980s, with the opening of Mod Quad residence halls Pasquerilla East, Pasquerilla West, Knott, and Siegfried Halls. These four halls were the first to be built exclusively for women and were constructed because of the large increase in the female student population.

Further expansion came in the 1996–1997 with the construction of four residence halls in the new West Quad (Welsh Family Hall, McGlinn, Keough Hall, and O'Neill Family). Each carried a similar plan and build and consisted mostly of doubles with some single and triple rooms and hosted between 262 and 282 students. This new construction coincided with the closure of Flanner and Grace as dorms, and their transition into office space. In order to maintain gender balance, female residents of Siegfried and Knott moved to the new Welsh Family and McGlinn and residents from Flanner moved to Siegfried and Knott in 1997. Residents from Grace moved to newly built Keough and O'Neill Family.

Construction of new halls progressed steadily into the 21st century, with Duncan (2008), Ryan (2009), and Baumer (2019) built on West Quad, and Dunne and Flaherty (2016), and Johnson Family (2020) built on the newly developed East Quad. Starting in 2017, the university moved towards a stricter residential model, with students required to stay on campus for their first three years.

Notre Dame embarked on a thorough renovation of dormitories with the 2015 Residential Master Plan. Starting with Walsh Hall in the 2016–17 academic year, residential halls underwent yearlong renovations that included structural revamping, interior refurbishing, and expansion of amenities. Badin was renovated in 2017–18, Morrissey in 2018–19, Dillon Hall in 2019–20, Sorin Hall in 2021–2022, and Alumni Hall in 2022–23. In 2016, when the first renovation started, the Pangborn community moved into Flaherty Hall and Pangborn was converted into a "swing hall", that would host the residents of the hall undergoing a renovation. In 2021, it was announced that Zahm Hall would take the role of "swing hall" going forward, and Pangborn was re-established as a male hall. Communities that undergo renovation preserve their original hall name and character while living in the swing hall, for example exemplified by name "Alumni Community in Zahm Hall" in 2022–2023.

In 2023 it was announced that Fisher and Pangborn halls would be demolished and replaced with new dorms.

== Organization ==
Each residence hall is directed by a rector with the assistance of two assistant rectors (graduate or professional students) and a variable number of resident assistants (from 4 to 9). Rectors act not only as administrators, but also as counselors and mentors. Residence halls can also house priests in residence and faculty-in-residence, although not all residence halls can accommodate.

=== Government ===
Each Hall elects its own hall government that runs its social life and plans events. It is made up of commissioners, representatives, and the elected Hall President and Vice President. Elections are coordinated by the Hall election coordinator. Halls prepare a variety of regular and monthly academic, social, volunteer oriented, spiritual, cultural, and athletic events. In particular, most halls have a service commissioner, since social service s a cornerstone of the Notre Dame student life. The weekly reunion of the hall government is termed Hall Council, and is led by the Hall President and vice-president and the Hall Senator and all dorm commissioners are required to attend, and all members of the dorm are also free to attend.

The Hall Presidents Council (HPC) reunites all hall presidents and serves as dedicated to improving student life, disseminating information, discussing common matters of residential life, and coordinating activities and facilitating programming among halls. It also runs the Hall of the Year competition.

The Student Senate, which functions as the legislative body of the Student Union, is composed by one elected member from each residence hall.

== Design and architectural styling ==
The earliest dorms, such as Sorin, St Edwards, Walsh, and Badin and were built under heavy French influence styles of Second Empire style and Châteauesque architecture. This style was the same as that used for the Main Building, Washington Hall, LaFortune and many of the earliest campus structures. While the architect for Sorin Hall was Willoughby J. Edbrooke, most of the other halls and structures were designed in house by members of the university themselves, such as Father Edward Sorin, Brother Charles Harding, Bro. Columkille Fitzgerald.

Starting in the 1920s, the new architectural style prevalent on campus became Neo Gothic. The complex formed Howard, Morrissey, and Lyons Halls, was designed in gothic architecture by Vincent Fagan and Francis Kervick, who were also professors of architecture at the university. These three buildings was constructed out in the usual yellow brick and a minimum of stone, in order to make them mesh better with the previous buildings and their surroundings. In line with the Gothic style, they feature pointed arches, spires, slate roofs, gables, and projecting bay of stone. Yet, they retain some elements of the French vernacular and Victorian Gothic of the previous buildings on Main Quad. They also were influenced by Tudor Gothic style. A second wave of buildings was built in the 1930s by the Boston-based firm of Maginnis & Walsh. Alumni and Dillon Hall were built in 1931. Compared with the buildings by Fagan and Kervick, the gothic style was closer to the Collegiate Gothic, with stone carvings and high gable roofs, and lacked those French vernacular elements that tied Howard, Morrissey, and Lyons to the Main Quad architecture. Maginnis and Walsh also built Zahm and Cavanaugh in the 1936–37, in a similar style but lacking the ornate exteriors and statuary of Alumni and Dillon. Breen-Phillips and Farley followed in similar style in 1939 and 1947.

The advent of modern architecture also impacted residence hall style. Keenan and Stanford, built in 1957, are representative of functionalist architecture with a simple double-L shape plan, a flat roof, and little exterior ornamentation and was designed by Ellerbe Becket. Although built in 1950s simple and un-ornamented style, it still was built in brick with stone trims that hints of gothic style. Ellerbe Becket, which has a long collaboration with Notre Dame (that included Notre Dame stadium), also designed the Mod Quad halls built in the 1980s in modernist architecture. When the first Mod Quad dorms were built in this new modernist style, with flat roofs and little decoration, they were criticized for not integrating well with the previous styles.

When Notre Dame started building more residential dorms in the 2000s, it opted to return to a style more aligned with Collegiate gothic and both Ryan Hall and Duncan Hall were designed in this style by Mackey Mitchell Architects. Similarly, three new dorms built between 2019 and 2019 were designed by Goody Clancy with Gothic features reminiscent of the Maginnis and Walsh period, a trend continued in the 2020s with designs by Mackey Mitchell Architects once more. Among those are the replacement halls for Fisher and Pangborn, which in addition to being built in collegiate gothic vernacular style, will also incorporate distinctive features: an entrance tower for the women's dorm and a distinctive chapel for the men's dorm. Another features of dorm construction in the 21st century is the focus on sustainable architecture and obtainment of LEED certifications.

== Programs and traditions ==
Notre Dame residence halls are the center of the campus student life, and each one hosts signature events, like the Keenan Revue, the Zahm Hall Bun run, Fisher Regatta, the Siegfried Day of Man, The Dillon Hall Pep Rally, Welsh Family Hoedown Throwdown, and many others.

=== Intramurals ===
Every residence hall fields a variety of intramural sports teams. Interhall football between Notre Dame male dorms is the only interhall tackle football which has remained at any US university.

== Halls ==
=== Cavanaugh Hall ===
Cavanaugh Hall
- Campus quad: North
- Established: 1936
- Named for: Rev. John W. Cavanaugh, CSC
- Architect: Maginnis & Walsh
- Architectural style: Collegiate Gothic
- Colors: Green and purple
- Gender: Female
- Rector: Marlyn Batista
- Undergraduates: 200
- Postgraduates: 2 (serving as Assistant Rectors)
- Chapel: Holy Spirit
- Mascot: Chaos
- Sports: Football, soccer, volleyball
- Charities: Hannah and Friends, St. Margaret's
- Major events: Snowball, Cavanaugh Corn Hole Tournament, Cavanaugh Open Ping Pong Tournament
- Website: Website

Cavanaugh Hall is located directly south of Zahm Hall and is directly north of LaFortune Student Center. Cavanaugh houses around 200 undergraduate students. Its central location gives the dorm a good view of the golden dome. The coat of arms is taken from the family arms of the Cavanaugh Family, with the colors adapted to match the green and purple of the hall.

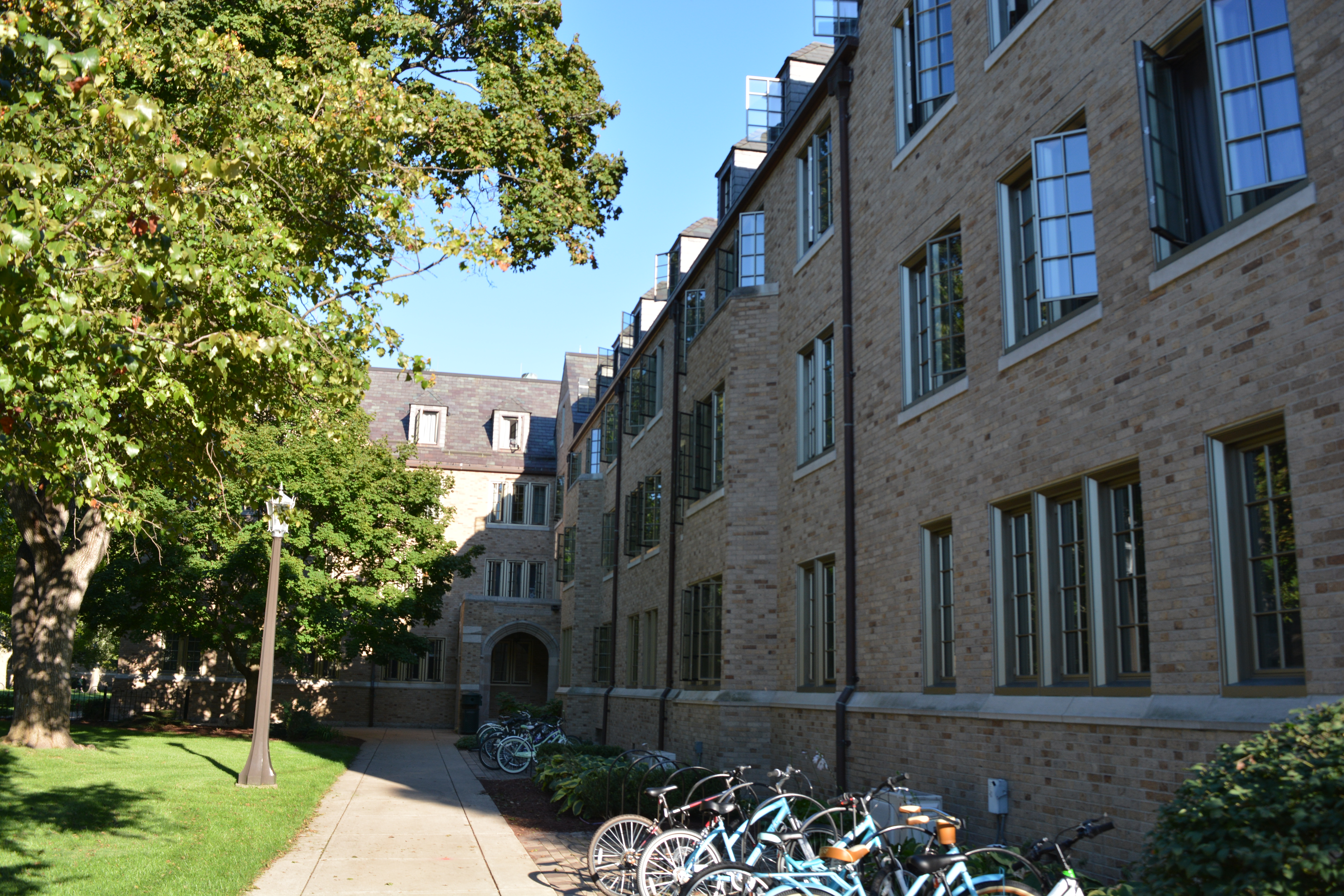
Cavanaugh Hall

==== History ====
In the 1930s, enrollment at Notre Dame was increasing by about one hundred a year, but on campus space was limited. This both forced students to live far from campus and was a loss of potential room and board income for the university. President John Francis O'Hara decided to build three new residence halls to remedy this problem: Cavanaugh in 1936, Zahm in 1937, and Breen-Phillips in 1939. In order to accommodate these buildings it was necessary to demolish Freshman and Sophomore Halls (which were low quality temporary structures) and the east wing of St. Edward's Hall. It was built in Collegiate Gothic and Tudor revival style.

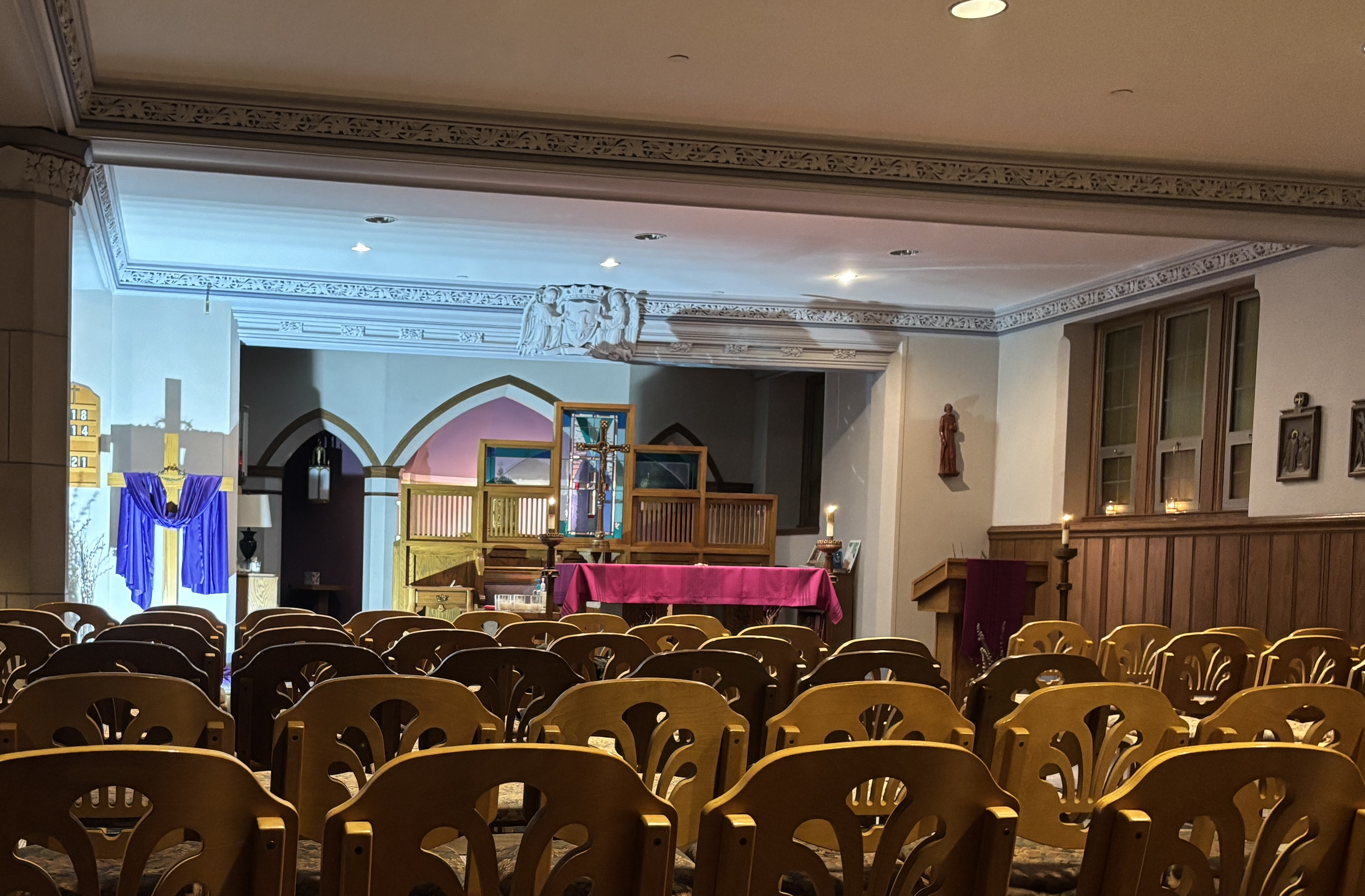
Chapel of the Holy Spirit in Cavanaugh Hall

It was named after Notre Dame's fifth president, Rev. John W. Cavanaugh, who has died only a year earlier. It was originally constructed to be the most northern and eastern building for the campus, however, this changed a year later when Zahm Hall was built. Architects were Maginnis and Walsh of Boston in a collegiate Gothic style, although less ornate and decorated than Alumni and Dillon Halls. During World War II, Cavanaugh, along with four other dorms, housed naval officers-in-training. Father Matthew Miceli served as Rector of Cavanaugh Hall from 1963 to 1990, holding the record at the time as longest-serving Rector of the same residence hall. He was beloved by the residents and affectionately referred to as "The Mooch". In 1994, with female enrollment to the university increasing, the dorm was converted to a female dorm. The chapel is dedicated to the Holy Spirit.

The current rector is Marlyn Batista.

==== Traditions ====
In the 1980s, its residents were called the Cavemen, supposedly in recognition of its large, cavernous basement, but more likely because Cavemen has the same first three letters as the Hall's name. An attempt was made to change the name to the Crusaders in 1988. The name was changed to the Cavaliers in 1994 and then to the Chaos. A tradition corn hole tournament is played every year, and many related activities take place in the preceding week. Mother-Daughter and Father-Daughter weekend are held in spring on alternate years.

==== Notable residents ====
- Tim Brown 1988
- Craig Counsell 1992
- Robert A. Dowd 1987
- Reggie Ho 1989
- Kate Markgraf
- James Naughton 1960
- Stephen Susco
- Barry Voight 1959
- Michael Voris

=== Duncan Hall ===
Duncan Hall
- Campus quad: West
- Motto: "Community, Brotherhood, Respect."
- Established: 2008
- Named for: Raymond T. Duncan
- Architect: Mackey Mitchell Architects
- Architectural style: modernist collegiate Gothic vernacular
- Colors: Duncan Tartan (blue and green)
- Gender: Male
- Rector: Nic Schoppe
- Undergraduates: 242
- Postgraduates: 2 (serving as Assistant Rectors)
- Chapel: St. Walter of Pontoise
- Mascot: Highlanders
- Sports: Baseball, basketball, bowling, cross country, dodgeball, football, golf, hockey, lacrosse, racquetball, soccer, table tennis, tennis, volleyball
- Major events: Highlander Highrise, Duncan Classic, Warthog Darty
- Website: http://duncan.nd.edu/

Duncan Hall is the fourth-newest male dorm on campus. It is located on West Quad, between McGlinn Hall and the Golf Course.

==== History ====
Duncan was built as the first of four new dorms built by the university to alleviate overcrowding in the existing residence halls. It was the first built since the completion of the original four West Quad dorms (Welsh Family, Keough, O'Neill, and McGlinn) in 1996/1997. It fills the space of former volleyball courts west of McGlinn Hall, filling the quad out to its western limit at Holy Cross Drive.

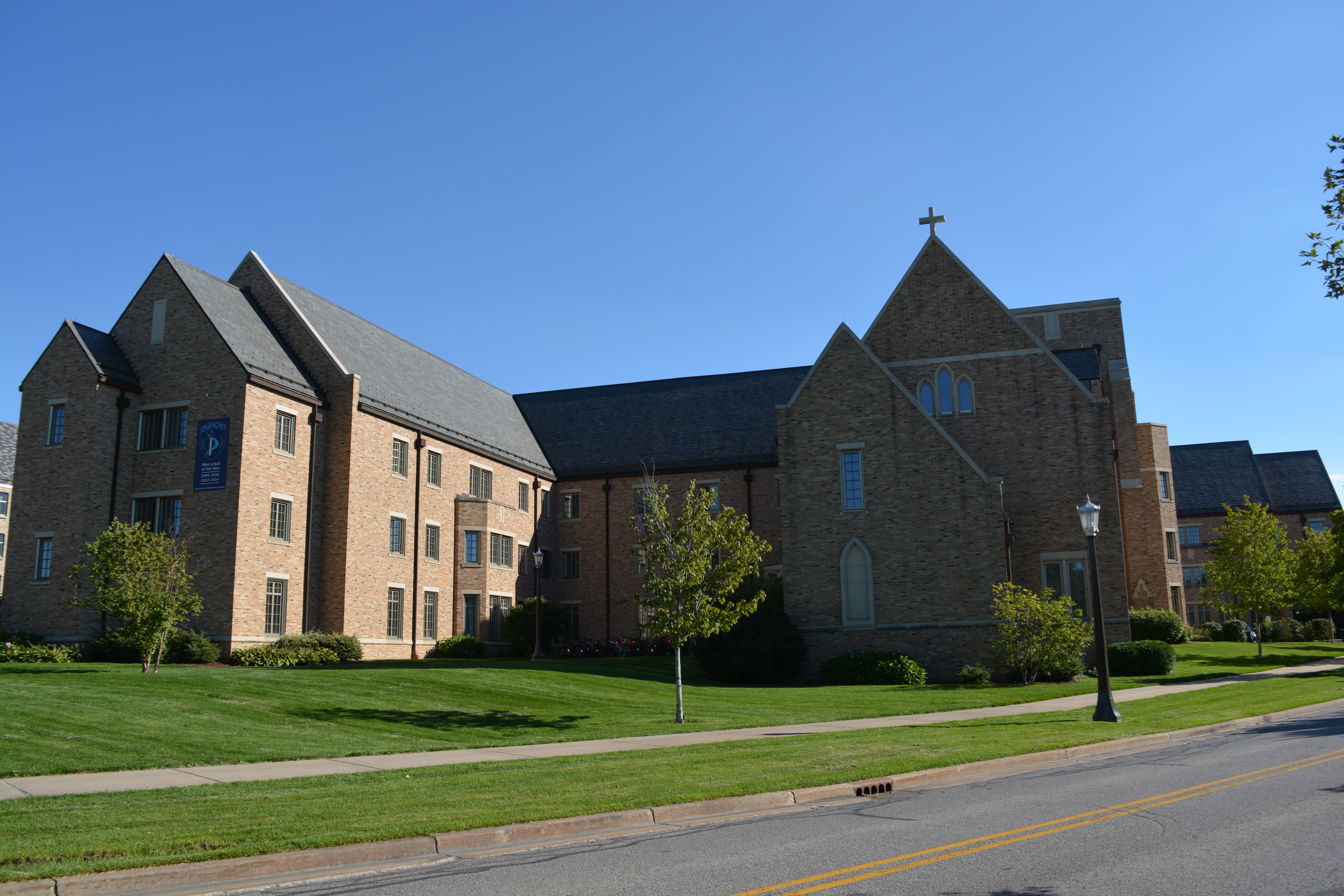
Duncan Hall

Duncan Hall is named for its benefactor Raymond T. Duncan, Notre Dame class of 1952, a personal friend of Joe O'Neill, benefactor of O'Neill Family Hall (also on West Quad). The Duncan family has strong family ties to the university, including Duncan's father Walter (class of 1912), two of his brothers and two of his sons.

Dorm construction began and was completed in 17 months, on schedule, to be opened for its first residents during ordinary move-in in August 2008. Mackey Mitchell Architects was the designer of this project, and the constructor was Larson-Danielson Construction, for which they were awarded a MACIAF 2008 Awards of Excellence.

The dorm incorporates features such as super-quads, which include private bathrooms, and super-doubles with bay windows, as well as a study lounge and social space in every section, 24-hour space with a large kitchen that hosts a food-service business called The Buff, and a basement with an exercise and laundry room. The rooms are larger than typical on-campus dorm rooms, and the dorm is generally viewed as relatively luxurious.

The inaugural freshman class was filled, as with any other dorm, by the random process of the Office of Residence Life and Housing. Residents from other three classes, however, were selected through a random lottery process six months prior to move-in, choosing 150 students from a voluntary applicant pool.

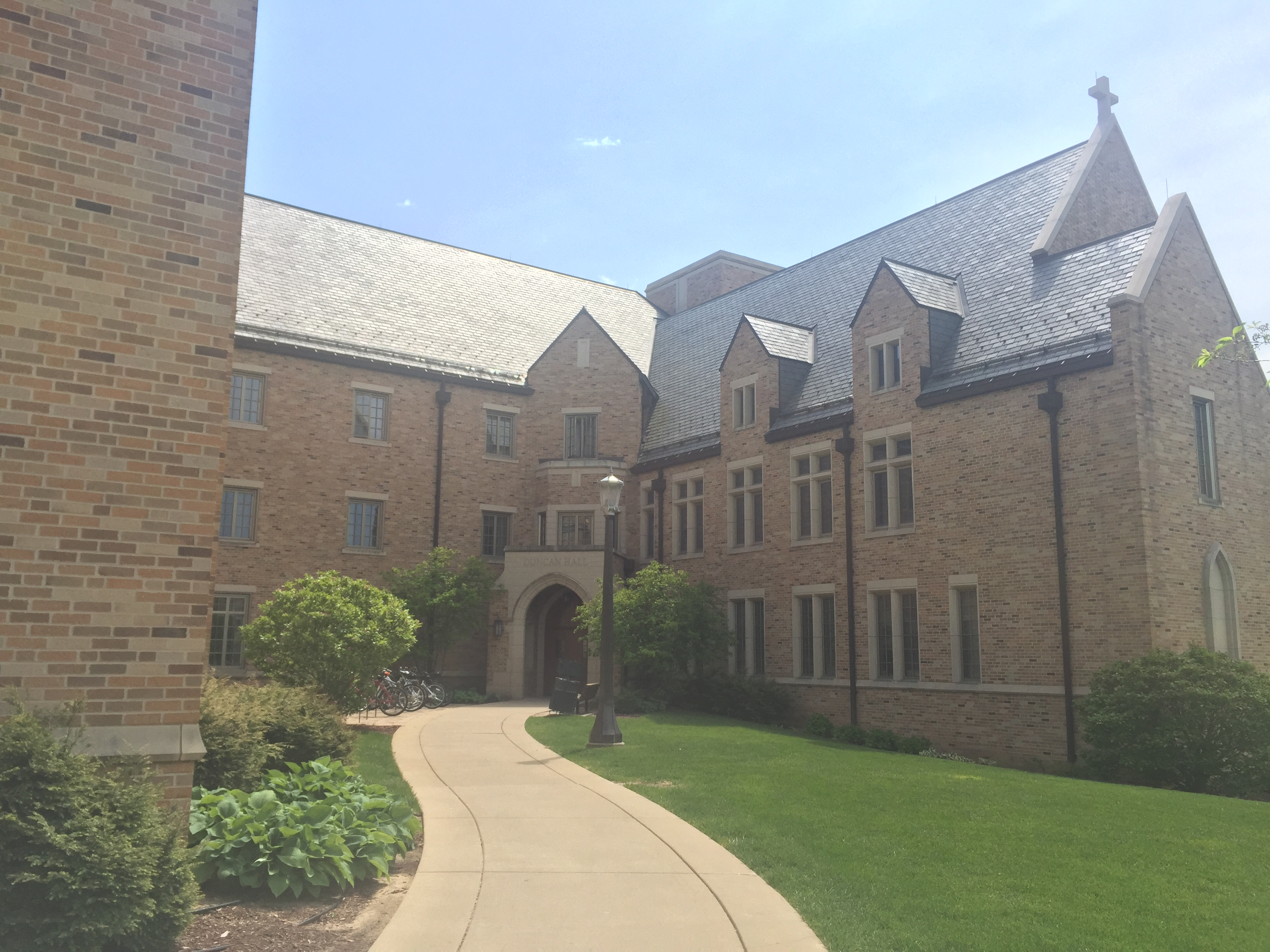
Duncan Hall

On Friday, October 3, 2008, Duncan Hall was formally dedicated, an event marked by a Mass in the chapel presided over by Fr. John Jenkins, University president, and attended by the Duncan family and distinguished guests as well as the dorm's residents and hall staff.

==== Traditions ====
The signature event of Duncan Hall is the Highlander Highrise, a formal ball held on the 99th floor of Willis Tower in Chicago. The Duncan 110, is a charity event on the day prior to 9/11, when participants climb 110 flights of Notre Dame Stadium to honor the response to tragedy of firefighters and police officers. Residents attend The Duncan Classic is a golf tournament held in the spring. Each class of first years participate in the Green Blazer Ceremony, where first year Highlanders receive a green sport coat embroidered with the Duncan Hall Crest.

==== Notable residents ====
- Markus Burton

=== Farley Hall ===
Farley Hall
- Location: Notre Dame, Indiana, USA
- Campus quad: North Quad
- Motto: "Come share life!"
- Established: 1947
- Named for: Rev. John "Pop" Farley, C.S.C.
- Architect: Maginnis and Walsh
- Colors: Teal and yellow
- Gender: Female
- Brother and sister halls: Stanford Hall and Lewis Hall
- Rector: Maeve Orlowski
- Undergraduates: 216
- Chapel: St. John the Evangelist
- Mascot: Finest
- Charities: Our Lady of the Road
- Major events: Pop Farley Week Potato Fest Pop Pickleball Tournament
- Website: Farley Hall website

Farley Hall is a female dorm. It is located on North Quad between Breen-Phillips Hall and North Dining Hall. It was named after Rev. John "Pop" Farley, C.S.C.

Farley Hall

==== History ====
After World War II, Notre Dame saw a large increase in its student population, partially due to the influx of veterans under the new G.I. Bill. A record 4,400 students attended in 1946. To accommodate the increased population, president Hugh O'Donnell announced in 1946 the construction of a new hall north of Breen-Phillips, originally only known as "Project F", but later revealed to be named after John "Pop" Farley.

John "Pop" O' Farley was one of the most well-known and beloved Notre Dame figures at the time. A native of Paterson, in 1897 he came to Notre Dame to study for the priesthood. A gifted athlete, he earned nine varsity monograms: four in football, four in baseball, and one in track. As a senior, he was the captain of the 1900 Notre Dame football team, with a 6–3–1 record under head coach Pat O'Dea. He graduated in 1901, entered Holy Cross Seminary, and ordained a Holy Cross priest in 1907. He spent the remaining 32 years of his life at Notre Dame, with the exception of some years at the University of Portland. He served as the rector for Corby, Walsh, and Sorin Halls, where he gained a reputation as a strict disciplinarian and thanks to his track speed, he could chase rule breakers across the campus. He was known to patrol the streets of South Bend, by driving the university's horse-powered "Skive Wagon". Despite his gruff attitude and the fact he never taught classes or preached on campus, he was known as a great counselor for students and was much beloved and a campus favorite, and he earned the paternal nickname "Pop". As a rector, he was involved in his dorm's interhall sports competitions, and did not miss attending sports events even after his leg was amputated after he suffered a stroke in 1937. He died on January 15, 1939, and was buried in Holy Cross Cemetery. In his honor, the Rev. John Francis "Pop" Farley, C.S.C. Award has been awarded since 1977 to university employees who distinguished themselves in service to students.

Construction, which cost $730,000 began in the summer of 1946 and was concluded in time for the semester beginning September 1947. In February 1947, Rev. Joseph D. Barry, C.S.C. was announced as the first rector of the yet to be completed Farley Hall. Barry was known as the "front-line chaplain" who won the Silver Star and had landed in Sicily in July 1943 and was involved in battles at Salerno, Anzio, Southern France, and Germany with the 45th Army Division.

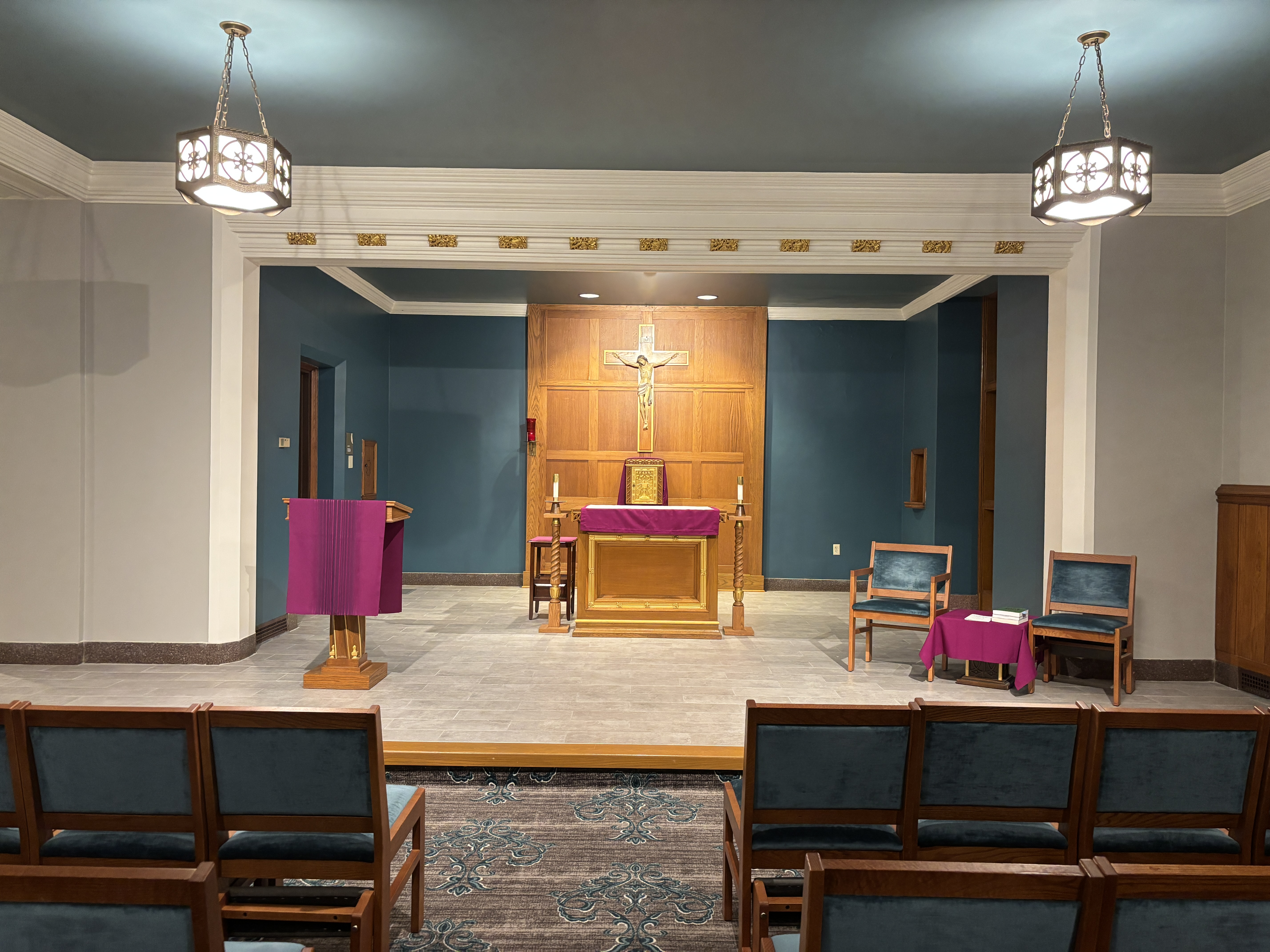
Chapel of St. John the Evangelist in Farley Hall at the University of Notre Dame

Farley Hall offered a variety of rooms including singles, doubles, triples, and quads. The hall rectors for the 1948–49 academic year were reported in the September–October issue of the Notre Dame Alumnus magazine. Rev. Theodore Hesburgh was appointed as the new rector of Farley Hall for the 1948–1949 year, before being appointed later in 1948 as the executive vice president of the university. Rev. Charles Sheedy, C.S.C. succeeded Father Hesburgh as rector for the 1949–50 academic year.

In 1965, together with Alumni and Dillon, it was the first dorm to try the "stay-hall" system, in which residents could stay all four years in the same hall rather than being divided by class as they were up until the 1960s. Farley became one of the 5 original women's dorms in 1973 when the university opened its doors to women. Sr. Jean Lenz was the first female rector and wrote of her experiences in her book, Loyal Sons and Daughters. She served as rector of Farley from 1972 to 1983, returned to live in Farley after retiring in 2008 and remained until her death in 2012. In the 1970s, under the direction of Sr. Lenz, the basement of the hall hosted "Motel Farley", a large open space with bunk beds that could host 36 girls, who were usually girls visiting from other schools or girlfriends of Notre Dame guys.

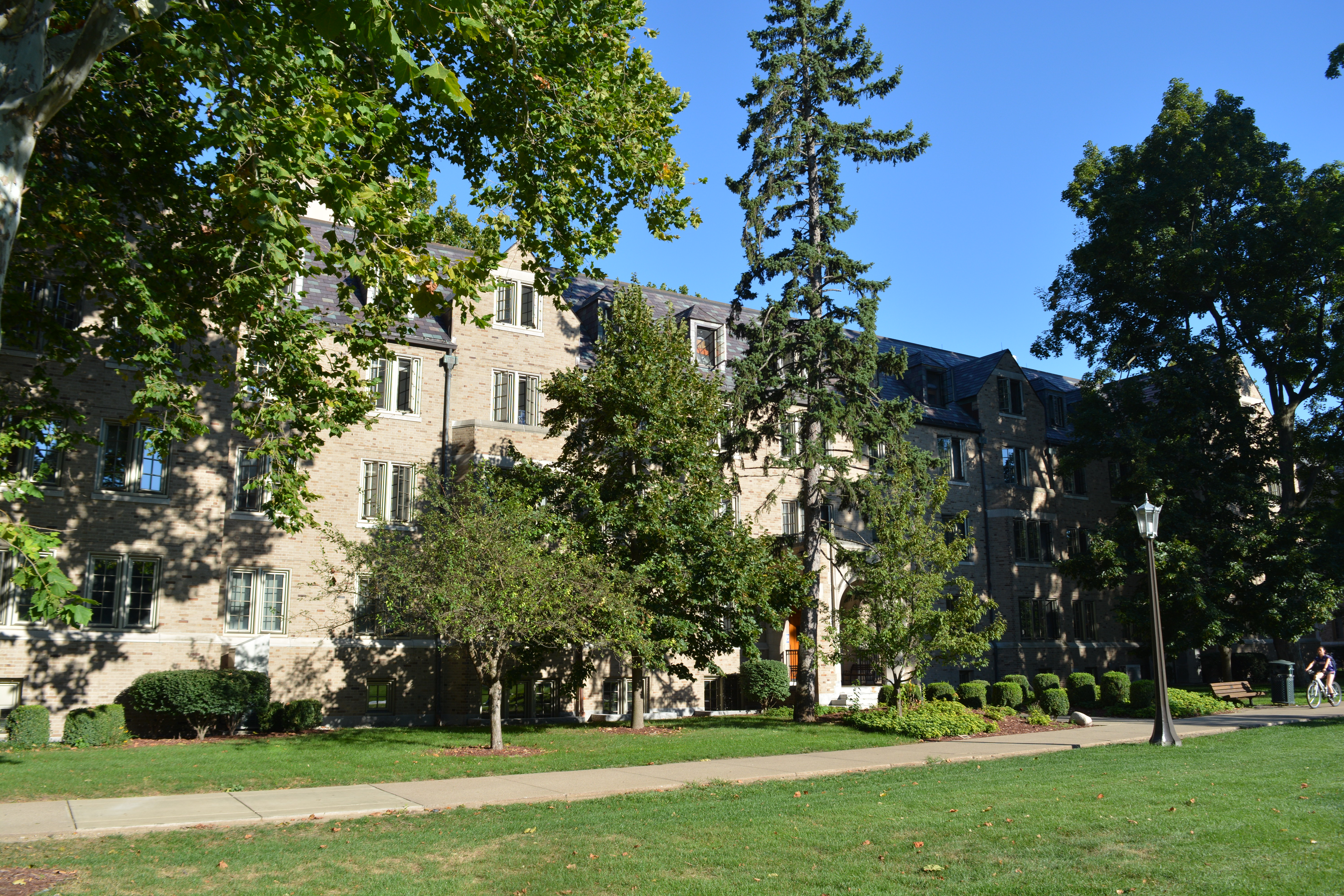
Front of Farley Hall, giving on North Quad

==== Traditions ====
The dorm's signature events are:

- Pop Farley Week, a series of events that takes place in February to honor Pop Farley during his birthday week. The week is full of dorm activities such as: skits, hall decorating, dancers, pickleball tournaments, and more. The event of the week is the grave trek to Pop Farley's grave on his birthday which is February 14.
- Potato Fest, an event during Pop Farley Week where Farley residents sell potato grams to fundraise for the Lady of Our Road organization. Students and faculty can write messages on the potato grams and Farley residents deliver these grams in the following days.
- Fall Fest, celebrates fall things such as: pumpkin patches, pie, apple sider, road bowling, bounce houses, games, and more!
- Farley 5K

==== Notable residents ====
- Bob Arnot 1970
- Theodore Hesburgh – rector in the 1940s
- Edward Malloy
- Martha Vázquez 1975
- Ann Claire Williams 1975

=== Graham Family Hall ===
Graham Family Hall is a male residence hall and the newest on Notre Dame's Campus. It opened in the Fall 2024 semester. It is located between Johnson Family Hall and the East Campus Research Complex. The building was donated by Tracy and Kerie Graham. Tracy is the founder of a technology-related private equity firm and a member of the Notre Dame Board of Trustees. Kerie, his wife, serves on the board of various St. Joseph County organizations.

The first floor sports an arched opening, creating a distinctive walkway that connects the building and provides east–west access along the existing sidewalk. One side of the floor houses communal areas, while the other features quiet study spaces, a reading room, and the hall chapel. Graham Family Hall offers a variety of student accommodations, including singles, doubles, quads, and six-person rooms. Each floor includes a community lounge with kitchens or kitchenettes, while fitness, laundry, and other facilities are situated on the lower level. The west side of the building features an outdoor patio.

Rev Bill Dailey, CSC, returned from four years in Ireland to serve as the first Rector of Graham Family Hall. He oversees residents in seven sections capable of housing up to 262 students.

=== Keough Hall ===
Keough Hall
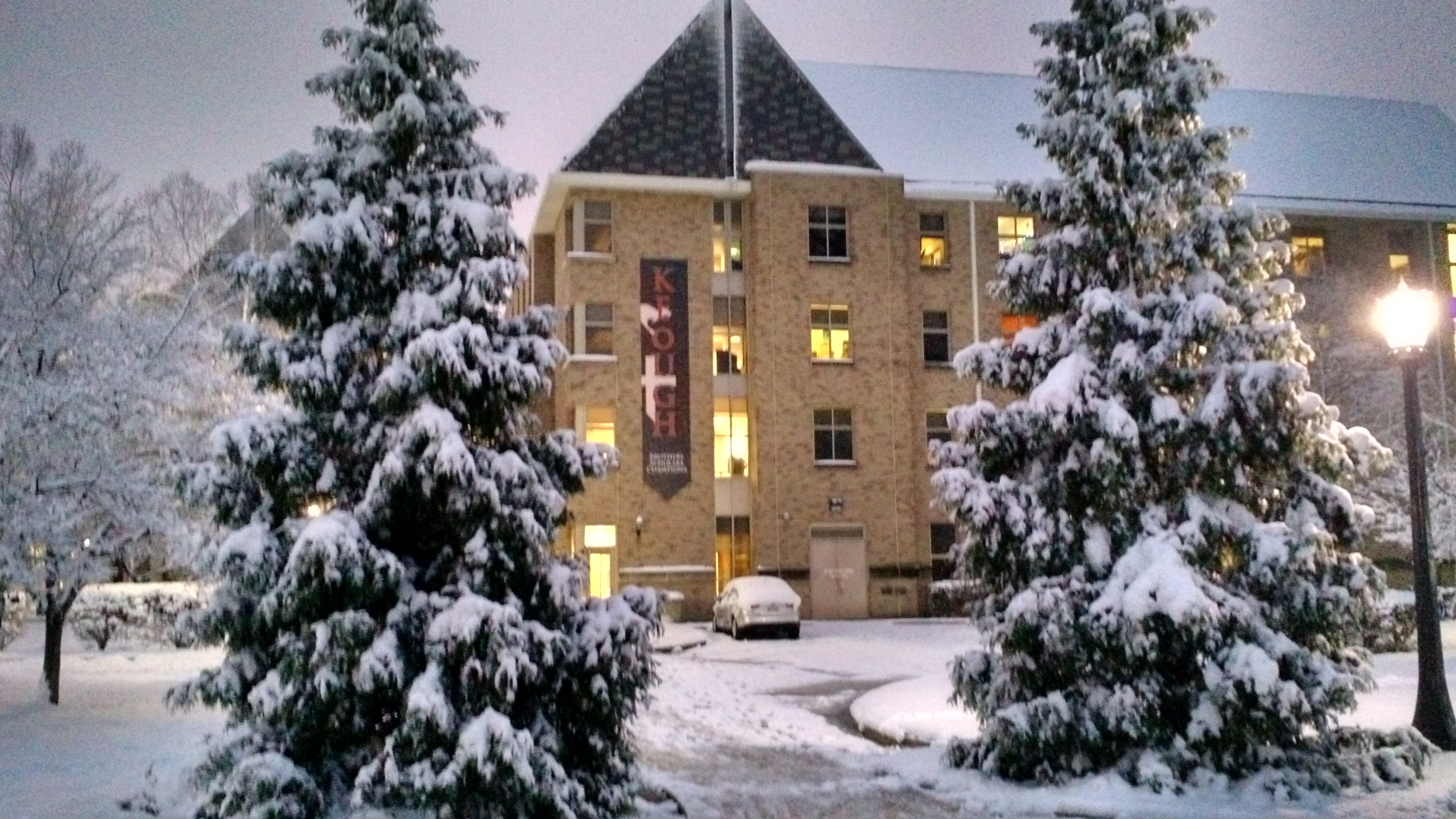

- Campus quad: West
- Motto: Brothers, Scholars, Champions
- Established: 1996
- Named for: Marilyn M. Keough
- Architect: Ellerbe Becket
- Colors: Navy and Red
- Gender: Male
- Rector: David Murray, C.S.C.
- President: Gavin Hodge
- Undergraduates: 285
- Postgraduates: 2 (serving as Assistant Rectors)
- Chapel: Our Lady of Guadalupe
- Mascot: Kangaroo
- Sports: Baseball, basketball, bowling, cross country, dodgeball, football, golf, hockey, lacrosse, racquetball, soccer, table tennis, tennis, volleyball
- Charities: St. Brendan's Parish, Kiete, Tanzania
- Major events: Keough Chariot Race, Keough/O'Neill Challenge, Grace Cup
- Website: https://www.roos.nd.edu/

==== History ====
Marilyn M. Keough Hall was dedicated on September 27, 1996. It is located on West Quad across from South Dining Hall with neighbors McGlinn Hall, O'Neill Family Hall, and Welsh Family Hall. Keough Hall is named after Marilyn Keough, wife of Donald Keough, who served as chairman of Notre Dame's Board of Trustees from 1986 to 1992. It was built as one of several replacement dorms for Flanner Hall and Grace Hall, both of which were turned into administrative buildings.

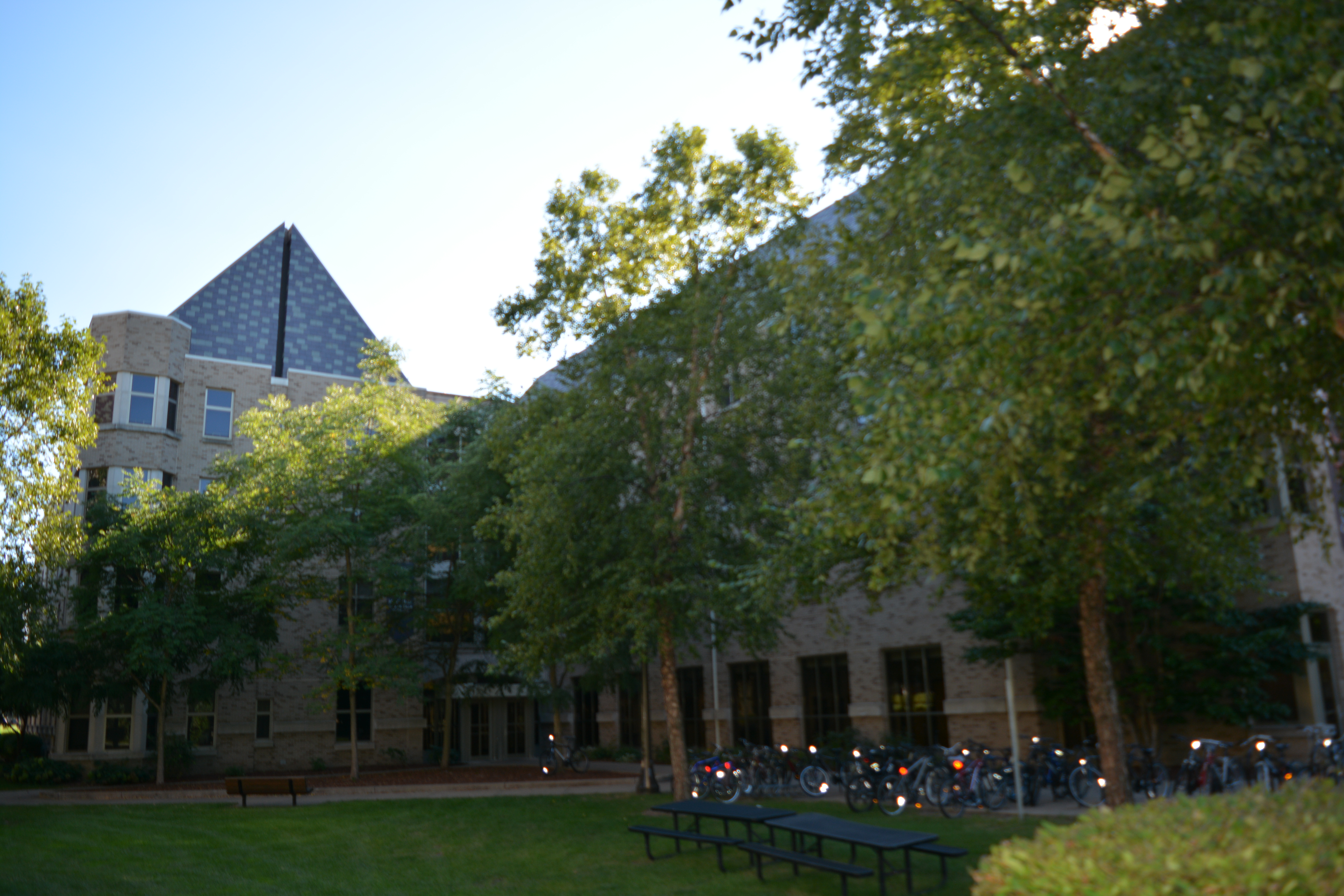
Main entrance to Keough Hall

The construction of halls on West Quad served to relocate students from Flanner and Grace. These two dorms, which each contained more than 500 students and spanned 11 floors, were converted into faculty, administration, and office space. The majority of Grace residents went to either O'Neill or Keough. The four new dorms built on West Quad were all of similar plan and build, each consisting mostly of double with some single and triple rooms, and hosting between 262 and 282 students.

Fr. Tom Doyle, C.S.C. served as Keough Hall's first Rector. Upon completing his Seminary training, he helped to dedicate Marilyn M. Keough Hall in August 1996. Fr. Tom was ordained a priest in the Congregation of Holy Cross in the spring of 1998 amidst his family, friends and 250 spirited young Men of Keough Hall. Doyle now serves as the Executive Vice President of University Relations at the University of Portland. Fr. Pete Jarret, C.S.C. arrived as rector in 2001 and led the community until 2006. Mark DeMott served as interim rector for the 2006–2007 school year. Keough Hall's current Rector is Fr. David Murray, C.S.C.

==== Traditions ====
Keough Hall residents won Men's Hall of the Year in the 2021–22 academic year.

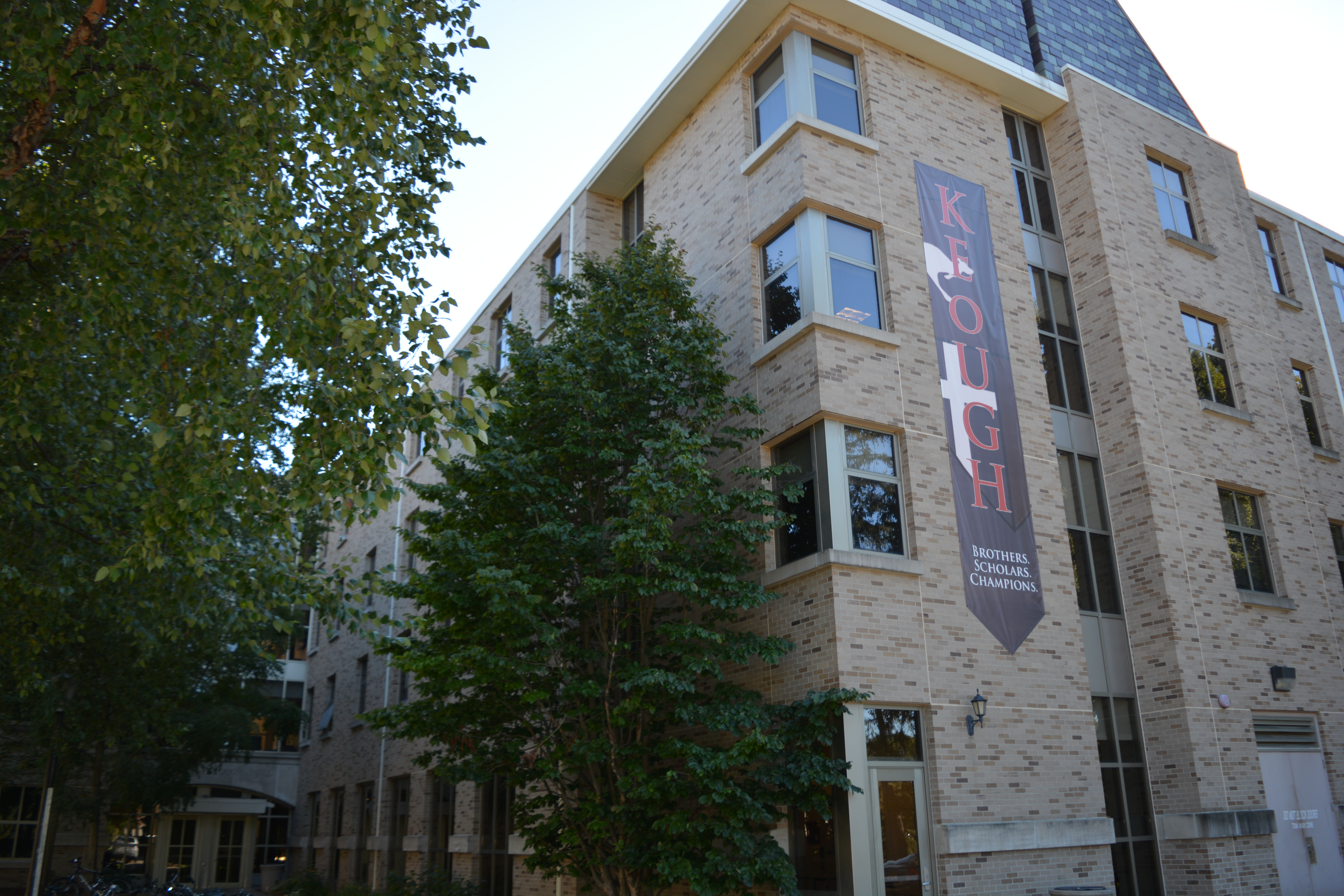
Main facade on West Quad in the summer

Every fall the dorm hosts the Keough Hall Chariot Race, in which the different sections within Keough, as well as other dorms, build chariots to race against one another. The day-long event is followed that night by a Toga Dance, in which both Keough residents and their dates wear bedsheets as "togas". In the spring, Keough once held a dance formal called the White Wedding in which the members of the dorm create a comical mock wedding ceremony for other members of the dorm and their dates. Late in the year the dorm hosts the Aussie Fest, which usually wraps up the year with a cookout, games and music. The hall also hosts a spiritual retreat called "Rootreat" and organizes summer service at St. Brendan's Parish in Tanzania.

==== Notable residents ====
- Zach Auguste – former Irish Power Forward and Center, professional basketball player for Muratbey Uşak Sportif of the Turkish Super League.
- Luke Harangody – former Irish Forward and 2007–2008 Big East Basketball Player of the Year
- Joseph Lapira – recipient of the Men's Hermann Award for Best Collegiate Soccer Player, member of the Irish National Soccer Team, and professional footballer currently playing for Nybergsund
- Ryan Raybould – former midfielder/defender for MLS and Swedish league soccer teams
- Travis Thomas – former Notre Dame football player
- Brendan Boyle – Congressman from Pennsylvania
- Chase Claypool – former Notre Dame football player, professional football player for the Pittsburgh Steelers of the National Football League

=== Knott Hall ===
Knott Hall
- Campus quad: Mod
- Established: 1988
- Named for: Marion Burk Knott
- Architect: Ellerbe Associates
- Colors: Orange and blue
- Gender: Male
- Rector: Fr. Jim King, C.S.C.
- Undergraduates: 258
- Chapel: St. Elizabeth Ann Seton
- Mascot: Juggerknotts
- Sports: Baseball, basketball, bowling, cross country, dodgeball, football, golf, hockey, lacrosse, racquetball, soccer, table tennis, tennis, volleyball
- Charities: Habitat for Humanity
- Major events: The Aidan Project
- Website: www3.nd.edu/~knott/

Knott Hall, a male dorm, is located on Mod Quad close to Siegfried Hall and the Theodore Hesburgh Library.

==== History ====
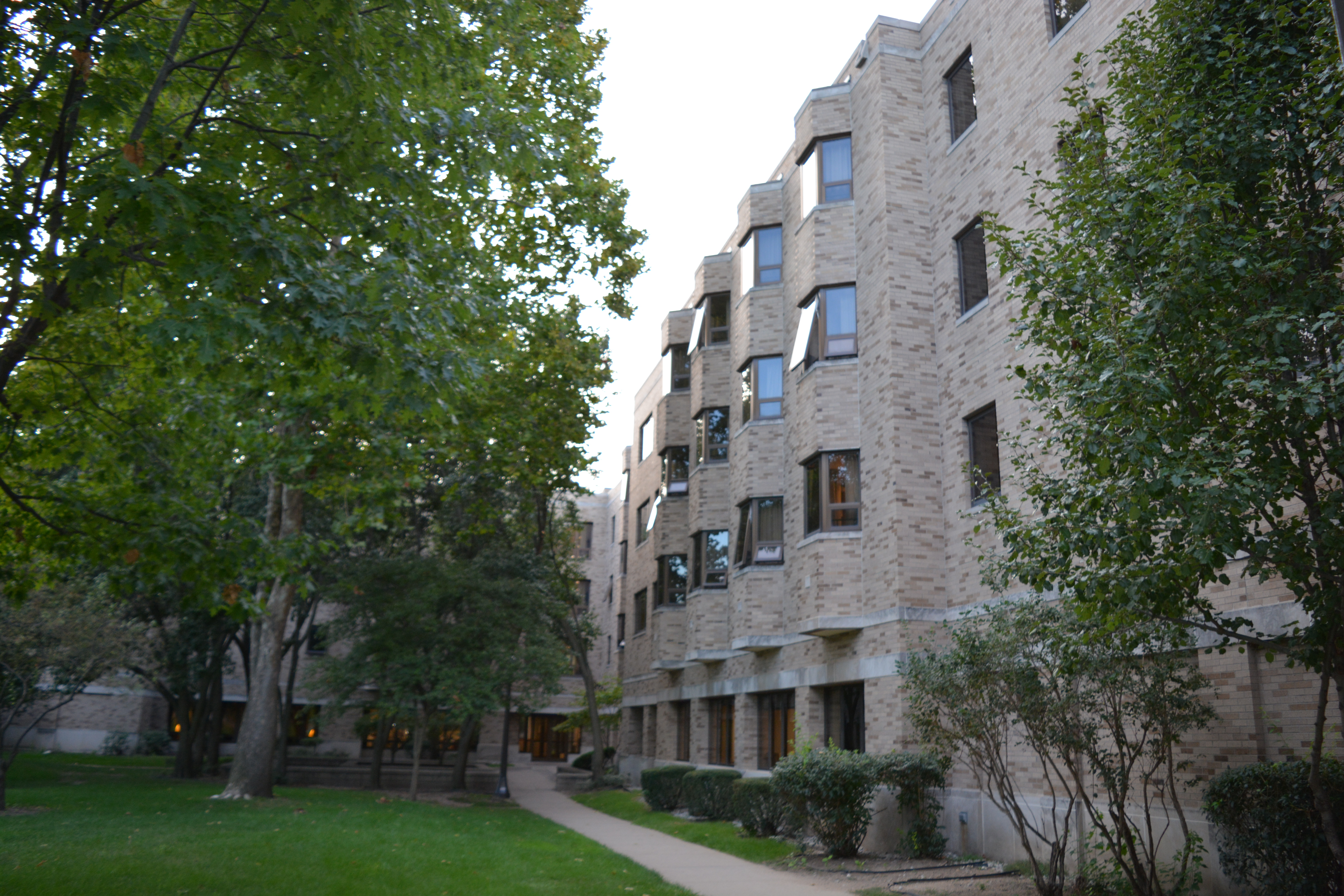
West side of Knott Hall, giving on Mod Quad

It was built in 1988 as a women's hall and named after Marion Burk Knott since the money was donated by her husband and Baltimore philanthropist and businessman Henry Joseph Knott. They met in the early 1900s and got married in 1928 while he was taking classes at Loyola College and she was a live-in nanny for a family in Baltimore. Henry built a development empire in Baltimore and felt a duty to reinvest in the community that had given him the opportunity to thrive. He and Marion frequently answered calls for help from the city, from small personal loans to large donations to education and religious institutions. The Knott Foundation was created in 1977 to coordinate their philanthropic ventures, which serves Catholic and other charitable institutions in Baltimore and around the nations. The couple had 13 children, one of whom died at an early age of cancer.

When originally built, the hall was a female dorm and home of the Knott Angels. When Grace and Flanner male dorms became administrative offices, residents from Grace moved to Keough Hall and O'Neill Family Hall. In order to maintain gender balance, female residents of Siegfried and Knott moved to Welsh Family Hall and McGlinn Hall and residents from Flanner moved to Siegfried and Knott in 1997.

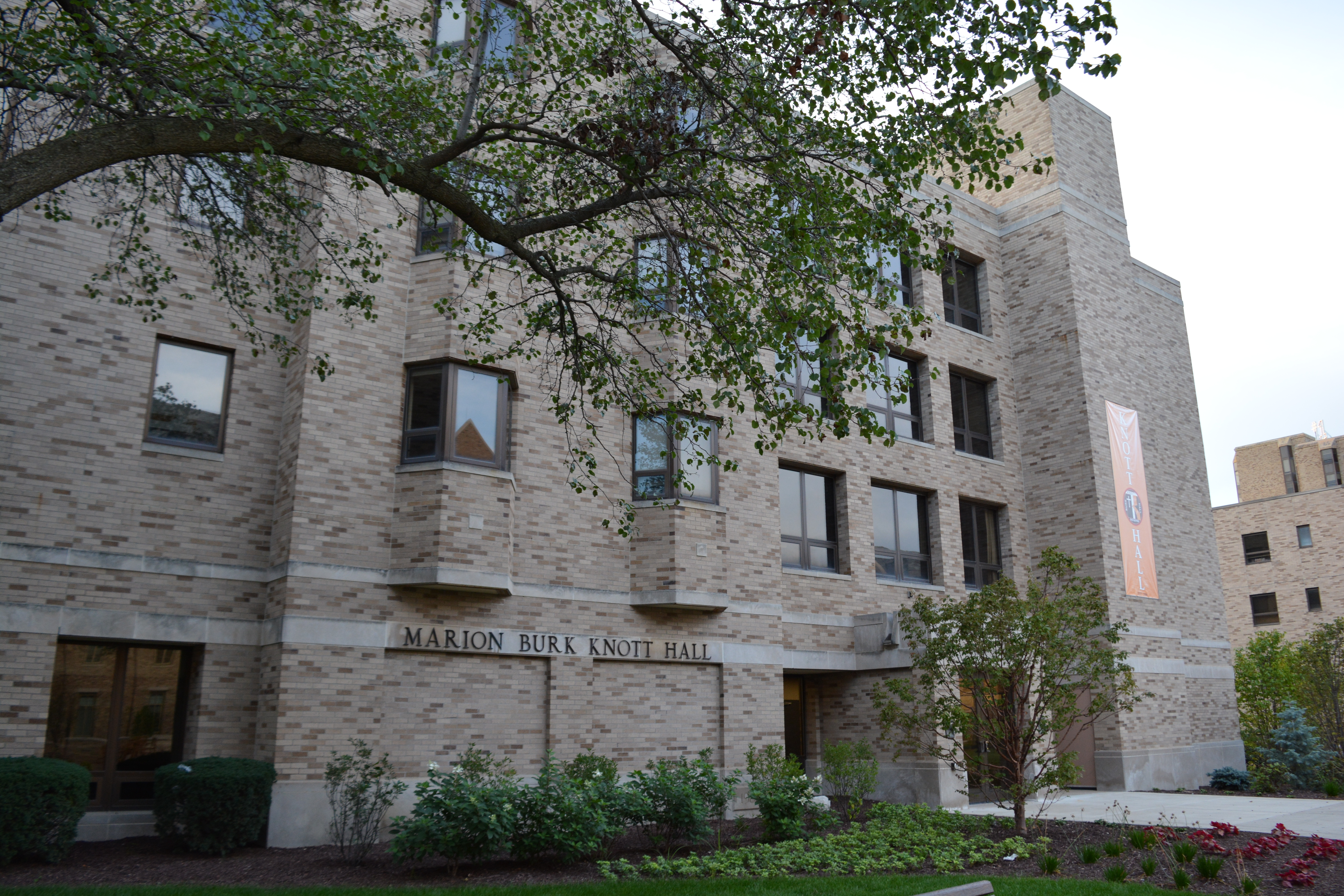
Entrance to Knott Hall

The most notable rector of Knott Hall is Br Jerome Meyer, C.S.C. Affectionately known by Juggerknotts as "Brojo", he was Knott's first rector as a men's dorm, and resided in Knott from 1997 to 2014. He earned his BA from Saint Edward's University and his M.Ed. in Mathematics from Saint Mary's College in Winona, Minnesota.

==== Description ====
The hall was built by Ellerbe Becket in modernist style. The chapel hosts a statue of Elizabeth Ann Seton donated to the hall by her grandson, Robert Seton.

==== Traditions ====
Knott men are nicknamed Juggerknotts. Their main rival is Siegfried Hall. Knott on the Knoll, the dorm's signature event, is a weekend of music hosted for the entire campus community. Other ventures include the Aiden Project charity for kids with cancer and the Splash Bash event (which includes food, inflatables, and water slides).

==== Notable residents ====
- Rocky Boiman
- Tom Zbikowski
- Mike McGlinchey
- Emerson Spartz
- Tim Keller
- Kyle Hamilton
- John Lee

=== McGlinn Hall ===
McGlinn Hall
- University of Notre Dame
- Arms: Argent a double-headed eagle vert, a bordure vert semy of trifoils argents
- Campus quad: West
- Established: 1997
- Named for: Terrence and Barbara McGlinn
- Architect: Ellerbe Beckett
- Colors: Green
- Gender: Female
- Rector: Liz Greenop (Suspended)
- Undergraduates: 270
- Chapel: Saint Bridgit
- Mascot: Shamrocks
- Sports: Flag football, bowling, cross country, lacrosse, soccer, table tennis, tennis, volleyball, racquetball
- Charities: St. Adalbert's School
- Major events: Spirit Week, Casino Night
- Website: www.nd.edu/~mcglinn/

McGlinn is located on West Quad, behind South Dining Hall and in between O'Neill Family Hall and Duncan Hall. Built in 1997, McGlinn is one of the newer dorms on campus and has modern day amenities, including air conditioning and an elevator. With a capacity of 270 residents, McGlinn is the largest female dorm on campus. The coat of arms is taken from the McGlinn family, with the double headed eagle, while the shamrock is the symbol of the hall.

==== History ====
Constructed in 1997 through the contributions of Terrence and Barbara McGlinn, McGlinn Hall is one of the newest dorms at the University of Notre Dame. The Angels of Knott Hall (now a male residence) moved into McGlinn in the fall of 1997 and quickly established the dorm as one full of spirit and pride. It joins Keough, O'Neill, and Welsh Family Halls on the West Quad – sometimes called the "Suburbs" because of the modern amenities of air conditioning, elevators, and the largest rooms on campus. McGlinn enjoys a convenient location, only a brief walk to the bookstore, athletic fields, South Dining Hall and Reckers.

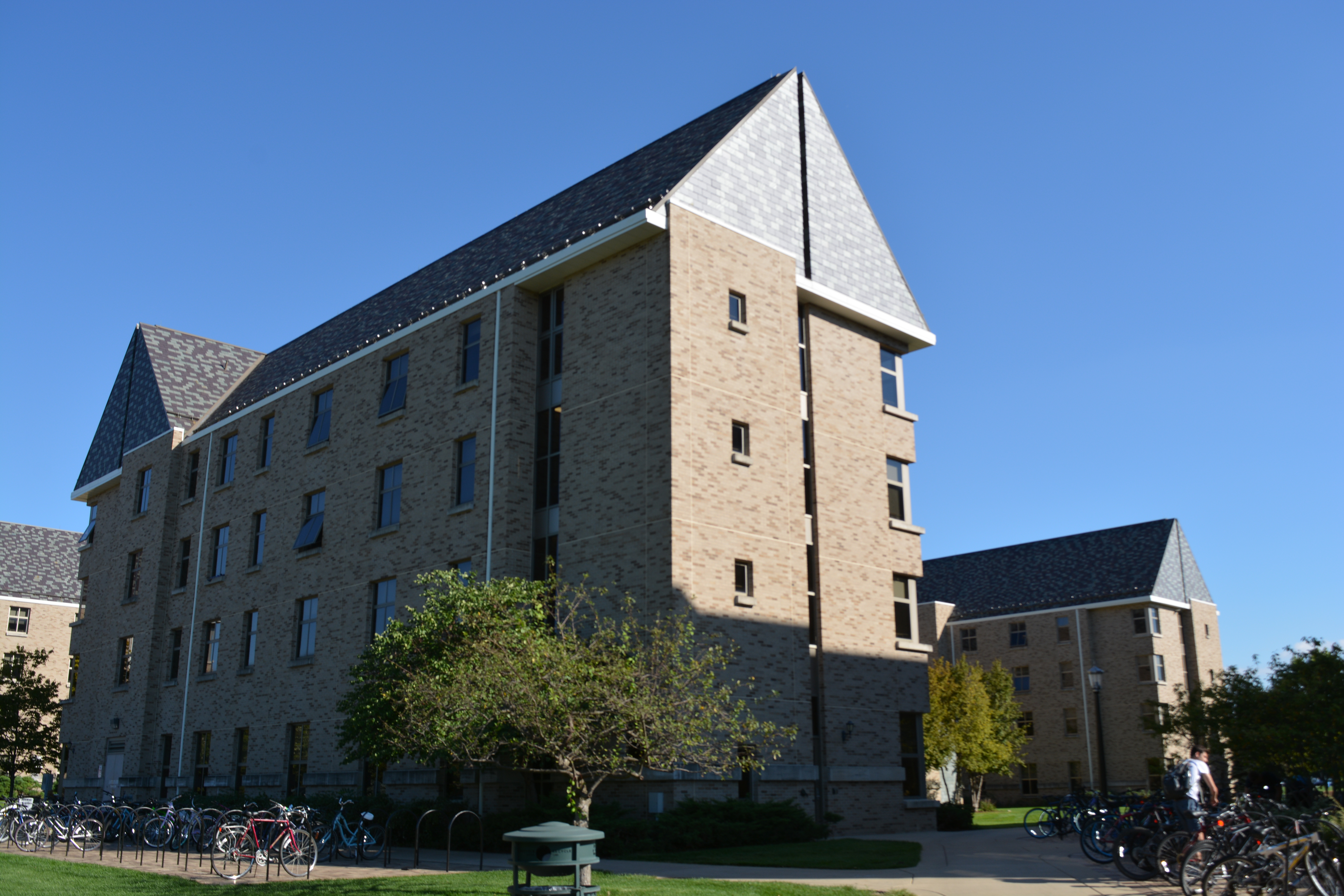
McGlinn Hall

Liz Greenop has been rector of McGlinn Hall since 2024. She is originally from Grand Rapids, Michigan and attended Xavier University for her undergraduate degrees in Psychology and Theology. Liz received her Masters of Theology from the University of Notre Dame. She is famous for her weekly "Bagels with Liz" event every Thursday morning, where she provides bagels and cream cheese and coffee for the girls of McGlinn. In June 2026, Greenop was placed on leave pending investigation of allegations of sexual misconduct.

Fr. Tom Blantz, CSC lived in McGlinn from the time its construction was completed in 1997 before moving out in 2015. He has worked as a history professor at Notre Dame and retired in 2012 to part-time teaching. Fr. Tom presided over mass in McGlinn Hall Chapel frequently. He always kept Snickers bars in a bowl outside of his apartment.

Fr. David Tyson, CSC lived in McGlinn beginning August 2015. He previously worked at the university in the 1970s and 1980s before being elected president of the University of Portland. Fr. David then became the president of Holy Cross College.

The current priest in residence at McGlinn Hall is Fr. Richard Bullene, CSC. Fr. Rich, as he is called by the members of McGlinn Hall, is also the Assistant Dean for advising for the Notre Dame School of Architecture.

==== Traditions ====
Casino Night is McGlinn Hall's signature event held every winter. It is a night of fun "casino-style" games, with most attendees playing roulette and blackjack with play money. All of the proceeds from the event are donated by the Shamrocks to St. Adalberts, a local grade school in South Bend. McGlinn also runs a Bubble Soccer tournament, a signature event that started in the fall of 2015, and is held in the fall and spring every year. Players create a team and play soccer while in giant, inflatable bubbles, with the proceeds also going to St. Adalberts.

McGlinn is one of the few dorms with living donors. Because of this attribute, every resident in McGlinn receives a Christmas gift from the McGlinn family in early December. In 2012, every girl received a two-pound box of assorted chocolates to ensure a maximum energy level throughout study sessions and final exams.

McGlinn won Hall of the Year in 2018–2019, but the dome dance was cancelled due to the COVID-19 pandemic. McGlinn has also won the Kelly Cup, an award given to the female dorm with the most participation in interhall sports, seven times, in 2009, and from 2011 to 2016. Because of its frequent victories, large size, and close-knit dorm culture, McGlinn Hall is often referred to by the residents as "Touse" (Top House).

==== Notable residents ====
- Molly Bruggeman
- Sabrina Massialas
- Jadin O'Brien

=== Pasquerilla East Hall ===
Pasquerilla East
- Campus quad: Mod
- Motto: Hottest Dorm on Campus
- Established: 1981
- Named for: Frank and Sylvia Pasquerilla
- Architect: Ellerbe Associates
- Colors: Red and black
- Gender: Female
- Rector: Laurie Svatek
- Undergraduates: 256
- Chapel: Saint Catherine of Siena
- Mascot: Pyros
- Sports: Interhall Sports
- Charities: Hannah's House
- Major events: Silent Night, Silent Auction; So You Think You Can Sync; Can You Take the Heat?

Pasquerilla East Hall (referred colloquially as PE), is the home of the Pyros. The dorm's colors are red and black. Surrounding PE are the other three dorms on "Mod Quad," Knott Hall, Pasquerilla West Hall, and Siegfried Hall.

==== History ====
Pasquerilla East Hall was built in 1981 as a gift from Frank J. and Sylvia Pasquerilla. PE and its twin, Pasquerilla West, initially were built with the expectation that Pasquerilla's twin daughters would each occupy one of the halls during their senior years. At the time, the couple's donation of $7 million was the largest in the school's history by a living person. Initially, Frank Pasquerilla wanted the gift to be anonymous, but Fr. Theodore Hesburgh convinced him to disclose his name since it might attract other donors. The two halls were dedicated on November 13 and 14, 1981, with a series of events attended by Frank J. and Sylvia Pasquerilla and the inaugural residents of the halls. The events included a Dedication Musicale, Italian opera music program held in the library auditorium, a show of Italian art in the Snite Museum of Art, culminating in the "festa di Pasquerilla," an Italian cuisine luncheon in Stepan Center. Frank J Pasquerilla was an entrepreneur of Italian descent from Johnstown, Pennsylvania. He was the president in 1953 and eventually sole owner in 1961 of Crown American construction company, and later invested in shopping malls and hotels. Frank Pasquerilla was a philanthropist for many cultural institutions in the Johnstown areas such as the University of Pittsburgh at Johnstown and for many Catholic colleges, including Georgetown University and St. Francis College and was Knight Commander of the Order of St. Gregory the Great.

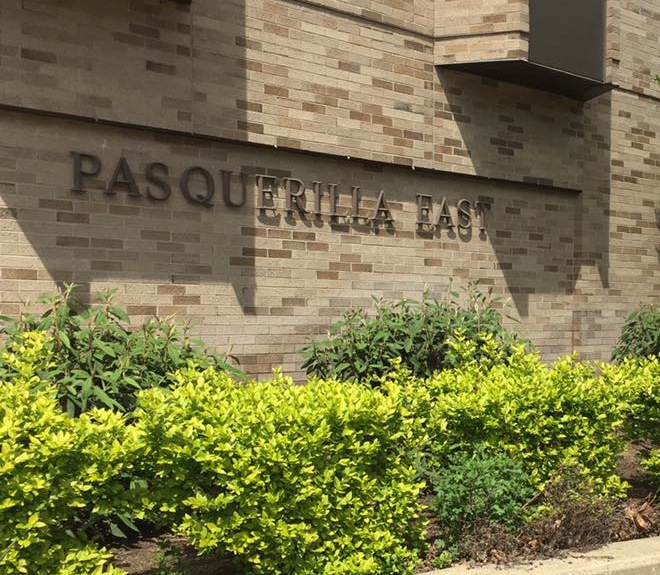
Pasquerilla East CC

==== Accolades ====
- Hall of the Year 2015/16
- Women's Hall of the Year 2012/13
- Women's Interhall Ping Pong Champions 2013–2015, 2019
- Women's Interhall Soccer Champions 2016
- Women's Interhall Tug of War Champions 2017–2018
- Women's Interhall Golf Champions, 2018

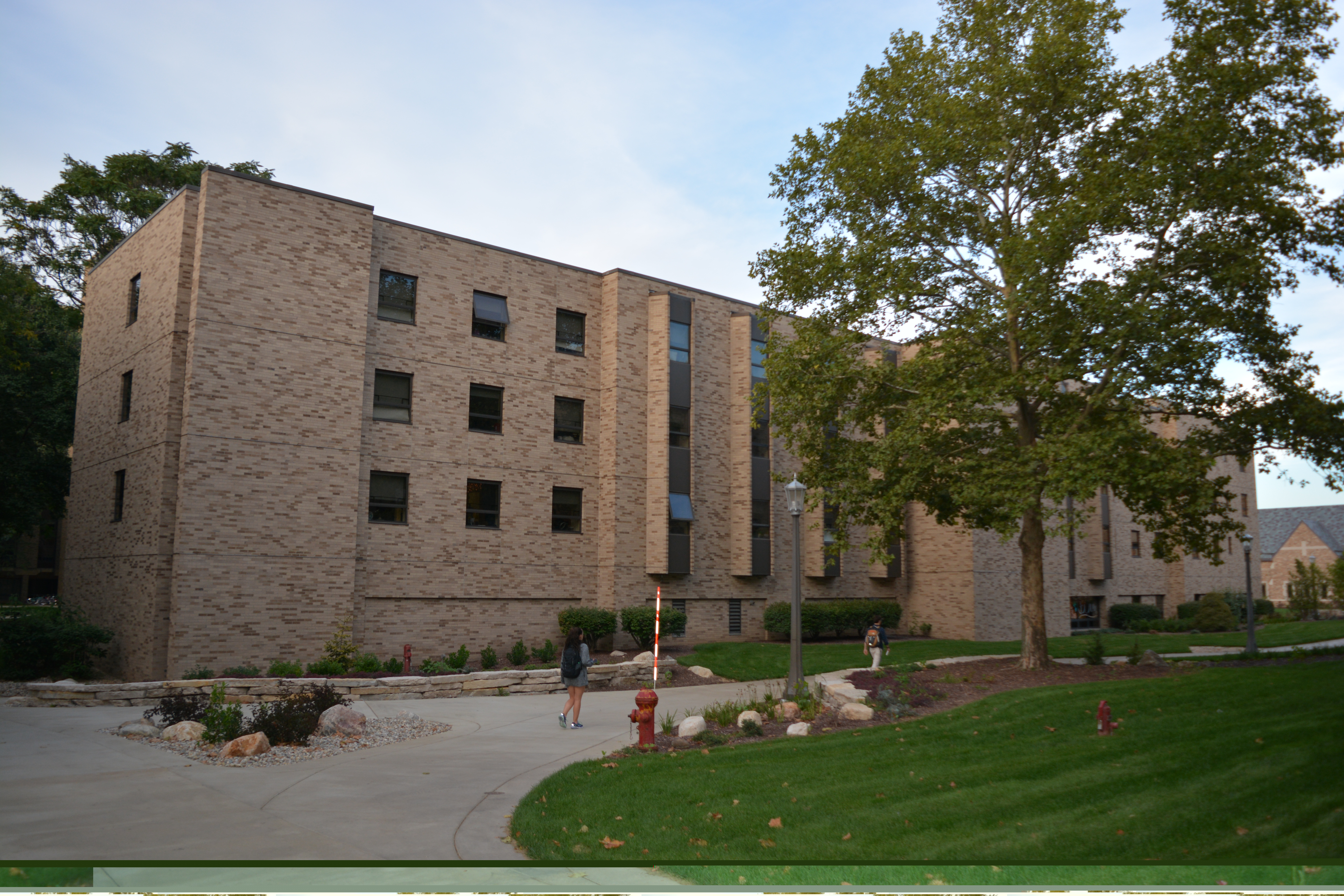
Pasquerilla Hall

==== Traditions ====
The six sections of PE compete in the PyrOlympics, a year-round section spirit contest. Additionally, PE's signature events are also a large part of the dorm's traditions, as Pasquerilla East has forged a strong bond with its sister charity. Although not specifically labelled as a PE tradition, Flag Football is one of the top interhall sports that Pyros participate in every year. Since 2013, the dorm's flag football team (known as PEFFB) has been coached by Notre Dame football players, including DaVaris Daniels and Malik Zaire. In 2015, PEFFB was coached by Zaire as well as his teammates Sheldon Day and Cole Luke. As a result, the dorm's football team was featured on the Showtime Special A Season with Notre Dame Football as a segment on the extracurricular lives of Zaire, Day, and Luke.

==== Notable residents ====
- Mariel Zagunis
- Beth Ann Fennelly 1993

=== Ryan Hall ===
Ryan Hall
- Campus quad: West
- Motto: Ryan go Bragh
- Established: 2009
- Named for: Shirley W. Ryan
- Architect: Mackey Mitchell Architects
- Colors: Aqua, navy, and white
- Gender: Female
- Rector: Ally Liedtke
- Undergraduates: 276
- Chapel: Saint Anne
- Mascot: Wildcats
- Charities: wheelchair basketball tournament
- Website: Website

Ryan Hall, built in 2009, is a women's dorm located on West Quad between Hammes Bookstore and Morris Inn.

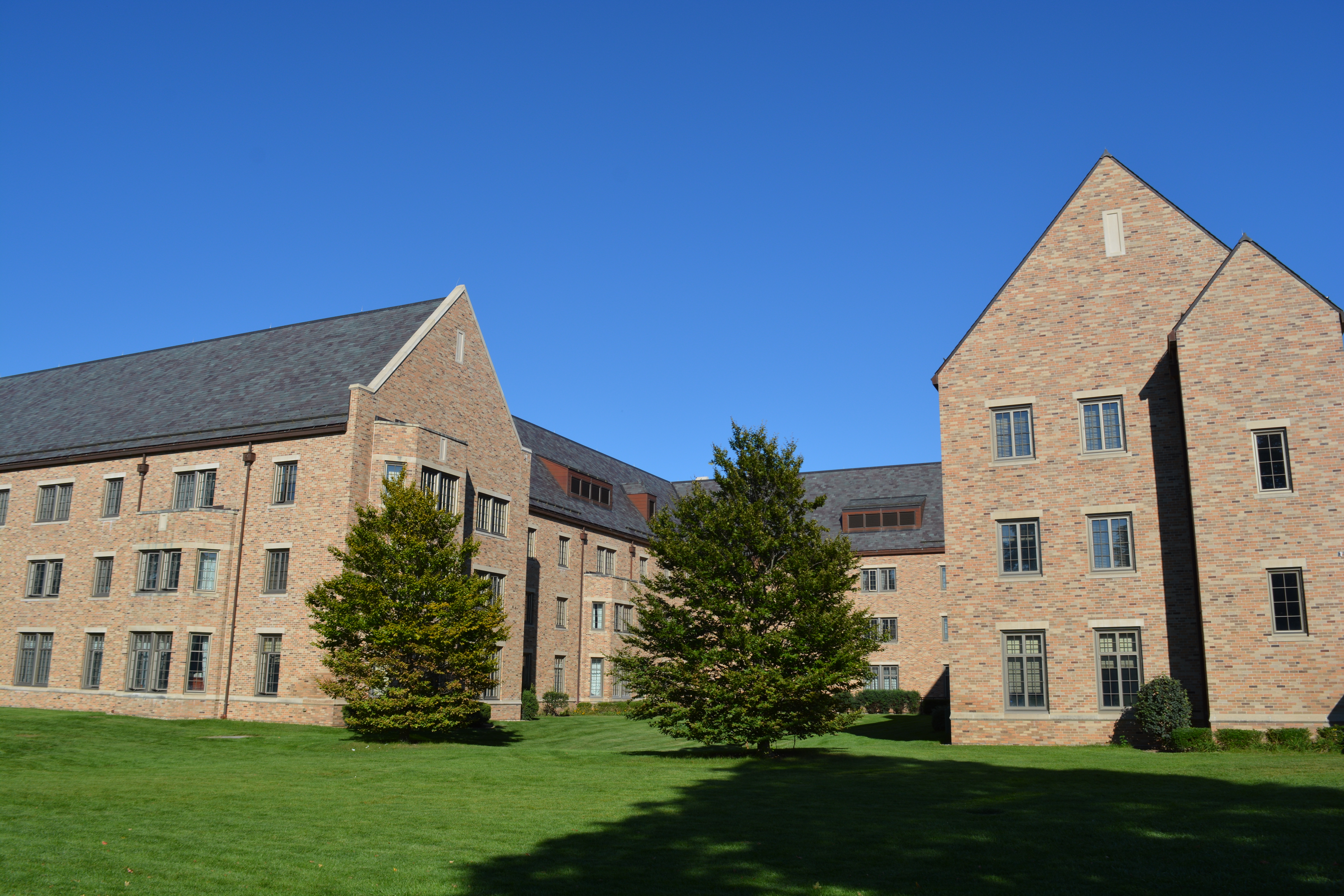
Ryan Hall

Ryan is known for being Notre Dame's most accessible dorm and also one of its most spacious and technologically advanced. Ryan's spirit colors are aqua, navy and white, and its chapel is dedicated to St. Anne. The coat of arms is taken from the Ryan family arms, but the color are modified to match the hall colors.

Spanning 75,000 square feet, the building was designed by Mackey Mitchell Architects and built by Skanska Corp and adheres to the modern collegiate Gothic style consistent with the university's campus. Achieving LEED gold certification, the hall incorporates various eco-friendly features, such as zero VOCs in adhesives and paints, low-flow plumbing, controllable lighting, and a focus on alternative transportation with bicycle storage, diverting 76 percent of construction debris from landfills, utilizing recycled materials, and prioritizing regional sourcing.

==== Traditions ====
Ryan's inhabitants are known as the Wildcats, and their signature event, an annual wheelchair basketball tournament, raises money for charities benefiting those with disabilities. Another well-known Ryan tradition is Waffle Wednesday Mass. Ryan's priest in residence, Father Joe Carey (affectionately known as FJ to students), creates another memorable tradition by baking cookies for the dorm every Tuesday night. Ryan Hall's rector, Allyse Gruslin, began her work in 2016. She owns a friendly corgi named Topper who regularly visits the dorm.

=== Siegfried Hall ===
Siegfried Hall
- Campus quad: Mod
- Motto: Hall of Champions
- Established: 1988
- Architect: Ellerbe Associates
- Colors: Maroon and gray
- Gender: Male
- Rector: Michael Davis
- Undergraduates: 252
- Chapel: Our Lady Seat of Wisdom
- Mascot: Ramblers
- Sports: Baseball, basketball, bowling, cross country, dodgeball, football, golf, hockey, lacrosse, racquetball, soccer, table tennis, tennis, volleyball
- Charities: ALS Research, South Bend Center for the Homeless
- Major events: Day of Man
- Website: sites.google.com/nd.edu/siegfriedhall/home

Siegfried is situated between Pasquerilla West Hall and Theodore Hesburgh Library on Mod Quad.

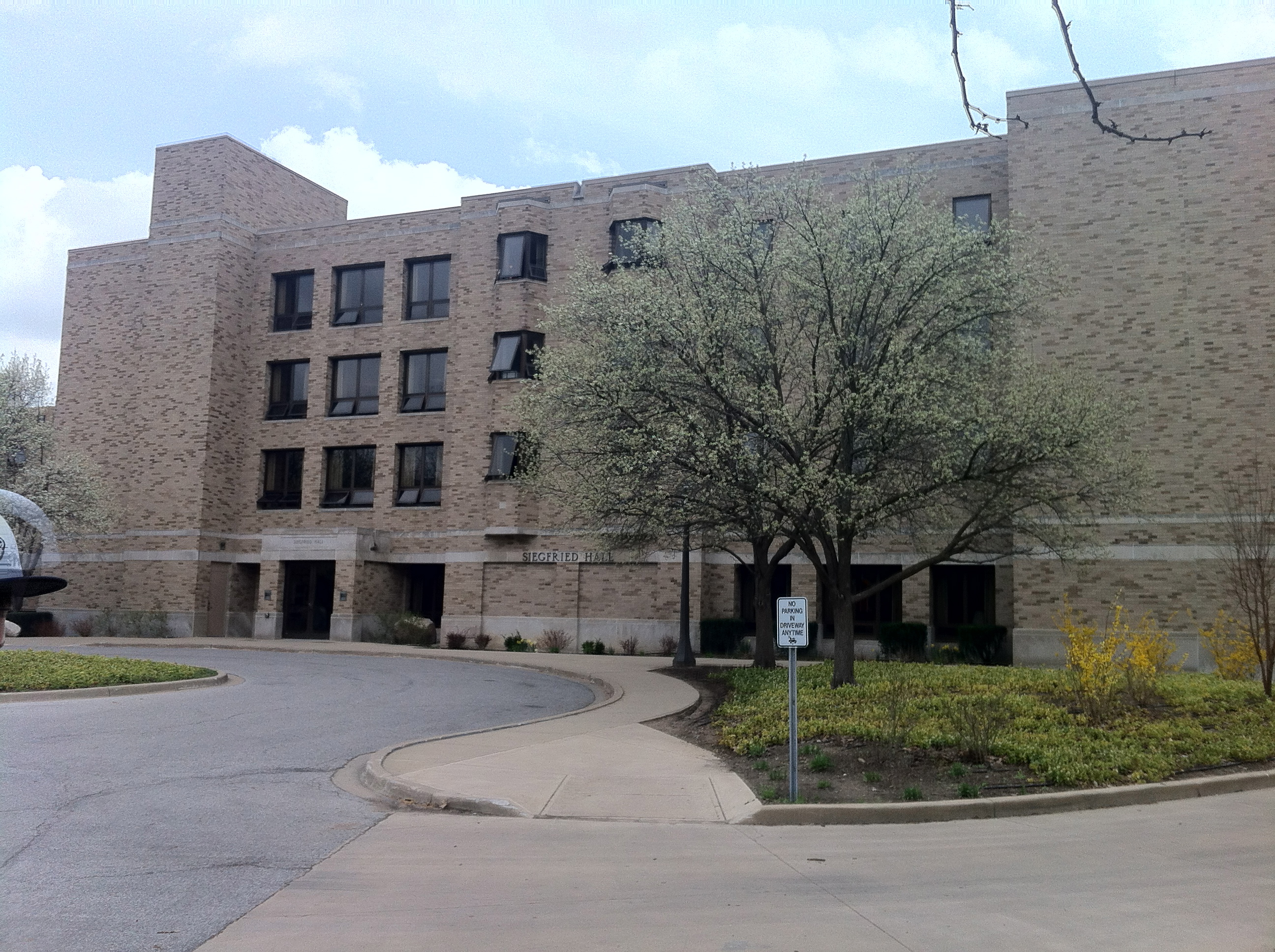
Siegfried Hall

==== History ====
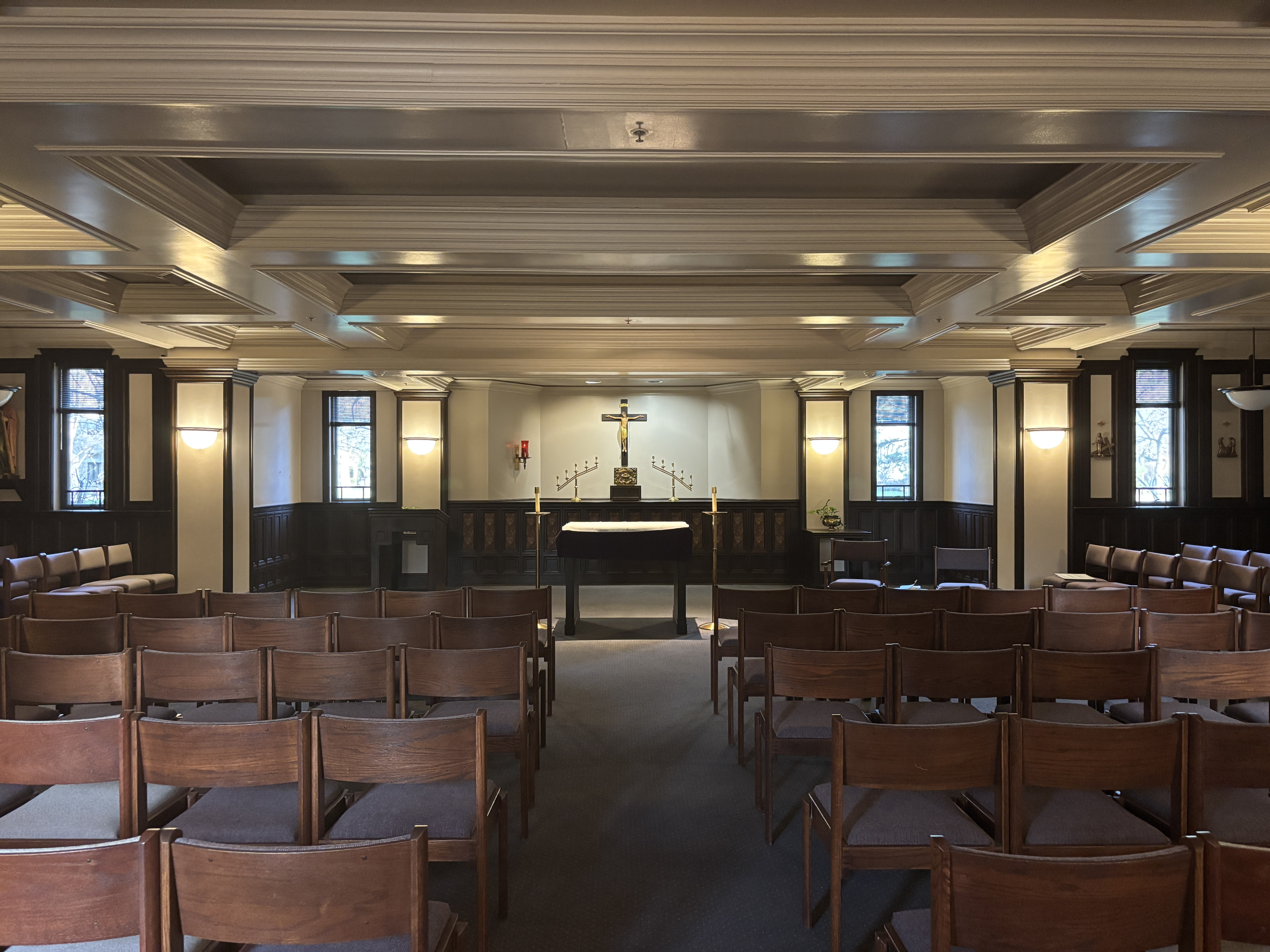
Chapel of Our Lady, Seat of Wisdom in Siegfried Hall

Constructed in 1988 through the financial commitments of Robert M. (1937) and Raymond H. (1965) Siegfried from Tulsa. the building was converted from a female hall to a male hall in 1997 after Flanner and Grace Halls became office space. The female residents of Siegfried Hall moved to Welsh Family Hall on West Quad. After the move, the new residents adopted the nickname "Ramblers" which was one of the former names used by the university before "Fighting Irish" was adopted. Siegfried is rivals with Knott Hall, the other male Mod Quad residence hall.

Siegfried and Knott are the only two residence halls to convert from female to male, in order to preserve Mod Quad's gender balance when male dorms Flanner and Grace became offices.

==== Traditions ====
Siegfried raises funds for the South Bend Homeless Shelter through its annual Day of Man fundraiser. On this cold February day, the Ramblers venture out in only T-shirts, flip-flops, and shorts. Siegfried residents are involved in activities ranging from the Notre Dame Marching Band to leadership roles in various clubs. Siegfried hosts two dances each year. The Winter Formal is held at the Warren Clubhouse. It is the only dance held at the Warren Golf Club, and is usually held the first weekend in December. Siegfried's annual retreat usually takes place in March, in a variety of places including in a state park, and across the lakes. Siegfried has a strong tradition of interhall athletic competition. The coat of arms features three gray chevrons gray on a maroon field, the colors of Siegfried.

==== Notable residents ====
- Tyler Eifert 2013 – Cincinnati Bengals
- Jeff Faine 2003 – New Orleans Saints
- Darius Fleming 2012 – New England Patriots
- Katryna Gaither 1997 – Minnesota Lynx
- Sean Mahan 2003 – Pittsburgh Steelers
- Justin Tuck 2005 – New York Giants
- Will Fuller 2016 – Houston Texans
- Drue Tranquill 2019 – Los Angeles Chargers
- Katryna Gaither
- Nikole Hannah-Jones

=== Stanford Hall ===
Stanford Hall
- Campus quad: North
- Motto: Guardians of the Gold Men of Virtue
- Established: 1957
- Named for: Grattan T. Stanford
- Architect: Ellerbe Associates
- Colors: Green and gold
- Gender: Male
- Rector: Rev. Chris Brennan, C.S.C.
- Undergraduates: 232
- Chapel: Holy Cross
- Mascot: Griffins
- Sports: Baseball, basketball, bowling, cross country, dodgeball, football, golf, hockey, lacrosse, racquetball, soccer, table tennis, tennis, volleyball
- Charities: South Bend Center for the Homeless
- Major events: Pirate Dance, Irish Iron Classic
- Website: stanfordhall.nd.edu

==== History ====
Stanford and Keenan were built in 1957. They were designed by Ellerbe Becket and built to house 150 rooms for 300 students. Keenan and Stanford are hosted in two wings of the same building, built on the spot that once hosted the toboggan of the university's minims program. Construction of the two halls was part of a $4 million plan which also included North Dining Hall. The building is representative of functionalist architecture with a simple double-L shape plan, a flat roof, and little exterior ornamentation. Of the two, Stanford is officially a bit older as it was dedicated in October of that year (Keenan was dedicated in November). Stanford was a gift of Effa Dunn Stanford in memory of her husband Grattan T. Stanford, and was to be named the 'Effa and Grattan Stanford Hall'.

Grattan Stanford, class of 1904, was graduate who would later serve as a lay trustee of the university. He was an Indiana native who spent his youth in Lawrence, Kansas before attending Notre Dame. Three years after his graduation he obtained a law degree from Harvard, and practice law independently before becoming general counsel of the Sinclair Oil Corporation in 1916 until his death in 1949. Ella Stanford was part of Notre Dame's Women's Advisory Council.

When the hall first opened, it was the first to have study halls and television lounges. Until the mid-60s, it was a hall for incoming freshmen.

==== Description ====
Stanford is a four-story building, built in minimalist and undadorned shapes, constructed in buff brick and limestone finishes. Stanford and Keenan share the Chapel of the Holy Cross, located off the lobby, which has a series of exquisite stained-glass windows featuring various types of crosses. Its highlight is Mestrovic's 13-foot mahogany crucifix, which the artist-in-residence executed especially for the chapel in 1957. Originally, the crucifix hung above a companion altar made of travertine marble imported from Italy. The altar was removed in the wake of Vatican II changes, but the Mestrovic crucifix remained. Another of Mestrovic's works, a wood carving titled Christ as Young Boy Teaching, is present in the lobby.

Stanford Hall entrance

==== Traditions ====
Stanford Hall's mascot is the Griffin. Its original mascot was a stud bull, hence the moniker "Stanford Studs". According to Notre Dame Magazine, "the switch was made in February 1999 to honor Father Robert F. Griffin, CSC, University chaplain for 30 years and a campus icon until his death in October 1999."

Stanford's traditional rival dorm is its twin Keenan Hall. Every year their interhall football matchup is deemed "The Battle for the Chapel" with the winner gaining naming rights to the chapel. Recently, Stanford has retained the chapel naming rights in 2015, 2016 and 2017. Despite the fact that the two dorms share two front doors side by side and the chapel has two entrances, it is tradition for the men of each dorm to only use the doors of their dorm.

==== Notable residents ====
- Colin Falls – former Notre Dame basketball player
- Mike Ferguson – former US Representative for New Jersey's 7th congressional district
- Mike Gann – former Notre Dame and NFL Atlanta Falcons football player
- David Givens – former Notre Dame and NFL football player
- Terry Hanratty – former Notre Dame and Pittsburgh Steelers football player
- Joe Kernan – former Governor and Lt. Governor of Indiana
- Rob Kurz – former Notre Dame and NBA basketball player
- Ted Leo – musician
- Andrew MacKay – swimmer who represented the Cayman Islands in the 2004 Summer Olympics
- Rhema McKnight – former Notre Dame football player
- Jimmy Brogan

=== Welsh Family Hall ===
Welsh Family Hall
- Campus quad: West
- Motto: Faith, Family, Friendship.
- Established: 1997
- Named for: Robert J. Welsh and Family
- Architect: Ellerbe Becket
- Colors: Light Blue and Navy
- Gender: Female
- Rector: Monica Murphy
- Undergraduates: 266
- Chapel: St. Kateri Tekakwitha
- Mascot: Whirlwind
- Sports: Basketball, bowling, cross country, dodgeball, flag football, golf, lacrosse, racquetball, soccer, table tennis, tennis, volleyball
- Charities: St. Marianne Cope Women's Education Fund, Unity Gardens (South Bend)
- Major events: Hoedown Throwdown, Dance Fest, Clary Murphy Thomas Run
- Website: http://www.nd.edu/~welshhal https://welshfamilyhall.weebly.com/

Welsh Family Hall (commonly known as Welsh Fam) is one of the 29 residence halls on the campus of the University of Notre Dame and one of the 14 female dorms. Welsh Family is located directly east of Keough Hall, west of Morris Inn and directly south of Dillon Hall. With its 132 rooms, it houses 266 undergraduate students. The coat of arms is taken from the Welsh family arms. The bordure represents a whirlwind, the mascot of the hall.

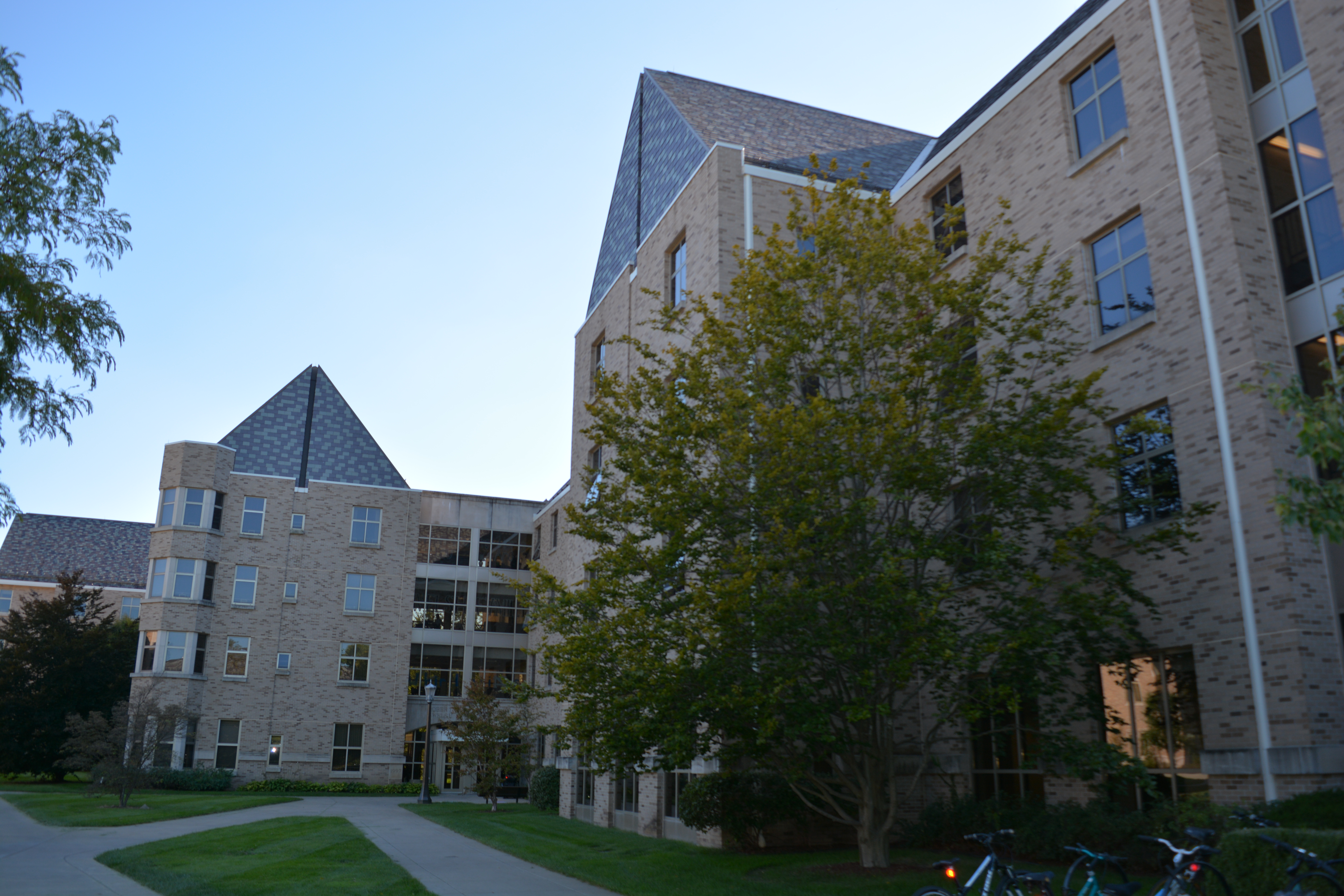
Welsh Fam

==== History ====
Welsh Family Hall was built in 1997 to house female undergraduate students and designed by the firm Ellerbe Becket. Its chapel is named for the Blessed Kateri Tekakwitha. The hall was built thanks to a donation from Robert J. Welsh Jr. 1956, a trustee emeritus of the university and former member of the Board of Regents of St. Mary's College, and his wife, Kathleen. Robert Welsh is the president and chief executive officer of Welsh Oil, Inc. The current rector is Monica Murphy.

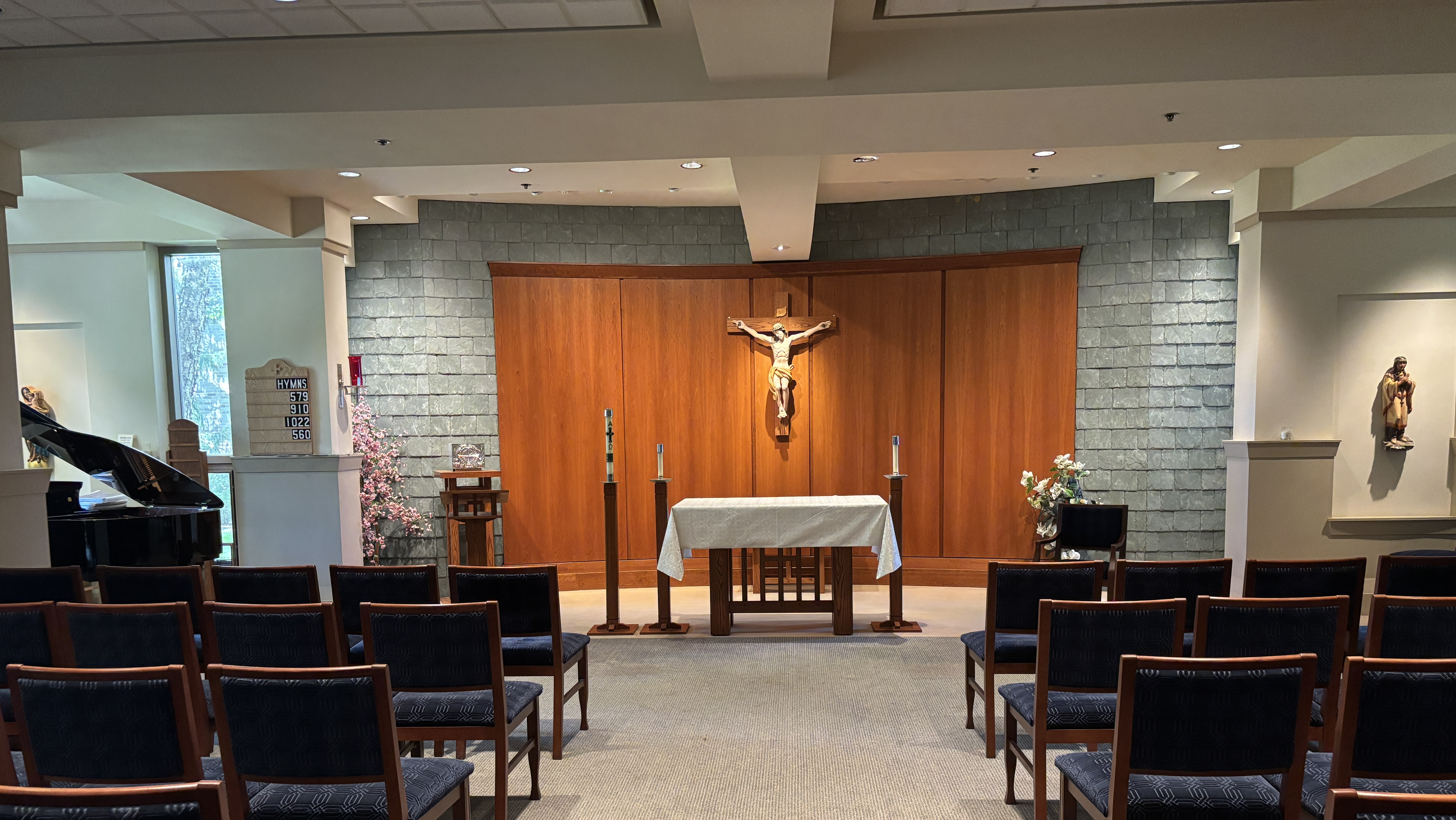
Chapel of Saint Kateri in Welsh Family Hall

==== Signature Events ====
- Hoedown Throwdown: This event debuted in the fall of 2018. It includes bull riding, apple cider and donuts to foster community within residents of all dorms, and donations commonly go to an organization in the South Bend area
- Clary Murphy Thomas 5k Color Run: This event raises money for cancer research in the memories of Brionne Clary, Connor Murphy, and Miranda Thomas, three class of 2002 students from the Class of 2002 who lost their battles with leukemia.
- Dances: Welsh Family hosts two dances during the academic year. An SYR ("set-up your roommate") is an informal dance hosted in the fall. In the spring, a formal is hosted.
- Welsh Family Retreat: As a part of faith life, each spring a retreat is hosted to get to know other Whirlwinds and dive deeper into themes of faith and spirituality. Previous retreats have been held at Hesburgh Library on campus and Camp Friedens Wald in Michigan.

==== Notable residents ====
- Skylar Diggins-Smith
- Ruth Riley
- Shannon Boxx
- Nikole Hannah-Jones 1998
- Molly Seidel

== Graduate and family housing ==
The Landings at Notre Dame is a graduate student complex reserved for students who have dependent children and/or who are married. Fischer Graduate Residences provide on-campus housing for house single or married graduate and professional students in either one-bedroom or two-bedroom apartments. Fischer opened in fall 1991.

Overlook at Notre Dame is a university-related community that offers studio or one-bedroom apartments directly on the eastern edge of campus.

At the end of the 2017–2018 school year, Fischer Graduate Residences became the designated housing for students with dependent children, as University Village closed at the end of that school year. University Village had two parts: Village Apartments, for students with children, and Cripe Street Apartments, for married students without children.

Notre Dame is in the South Bend Community School Corporation. The school zonings are as follows: Darden Elementary School Edison Middle School and Clay High School (for Landings at Notre Dame). Previously Darden Primary, Tarkington Traditional Elementary, Clay Intermediate, and Clay High served as the local public schools for children of graduate students at University Village.
