= Lewis Hall (Notre Dame) =

Residence hall at the University of Notre Dame

- Residence hall
- Campus quad: Main (God) Quad
- Coordinates: 41°42′16″N 86°14′22″W
- Motto: The Dome will lead you Home
- Established: 1965
- Named for: Frank J. Lewis
- Architect: Ellerbe Becket
- Architectural style: Modern
- Colors: Blue and yellow
- Gender: Female
- Brother dorm: Siegfried Hall
- Rector: Megan Moore
- Undergraduates: 269
- Chapel: St. Theresa of Avila Chapel
- Mascot: Chicks
- Charities: Food Bank of Northern Indiana
- Major events: Lewis House of Pancakes (LHOP), Crush Week
- Website: lewis.nd.edu housing.nd.edu/undergraduate/residence-halls/lewis-hall/

Map
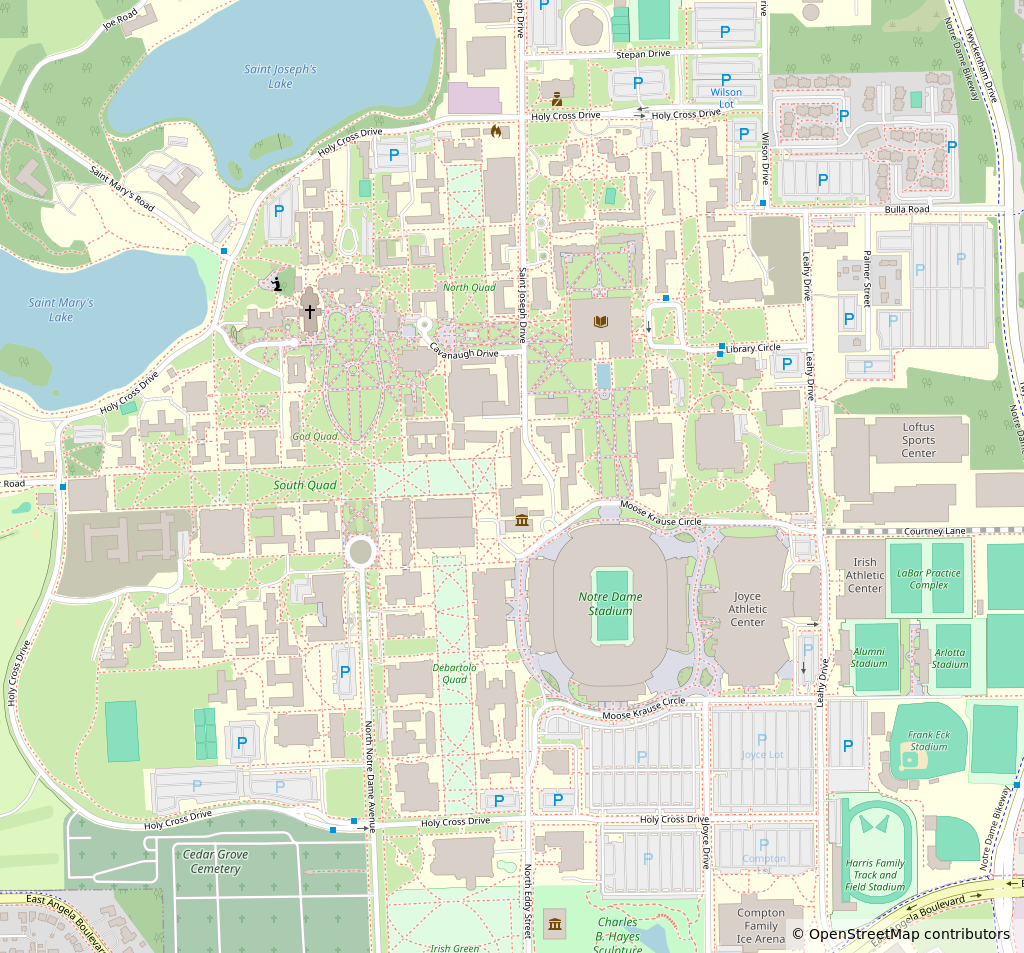
- Location within Notre Dame, Indiana

Lewis Hall is one of the 33 Residence Halls at the University of Notre Dame. Lewis is located northwest of the Main Building and south of St. Joseph's Lake. It was named 2013 Hall of the Year. The coat of arms features two chicks, the mascot of the hall, in blue and yellow, the hall colors.

== History ==
Built in 1965, Lewis Hall was funded by Julia Lewis in honor of her husband, Chicago philanthropist Frank Lewis. Lewis Hall was the first residence hall at Notre Dame constructed for female students. It originally served as a residence for religious sisters studying for master's degrees and in 1968 also provided housing for laywomen pursuing graduate degrees. It became a women's undergraduate residence hall in 1972, the year Notre Dame began admitting female undergraduates. The first undergraduate woman accepted at Notre Dame, Mary Ann Proctor, lived with the graduate students and nuns. With more than 250 residents, Lewis is one of the largest women's halls on campus.

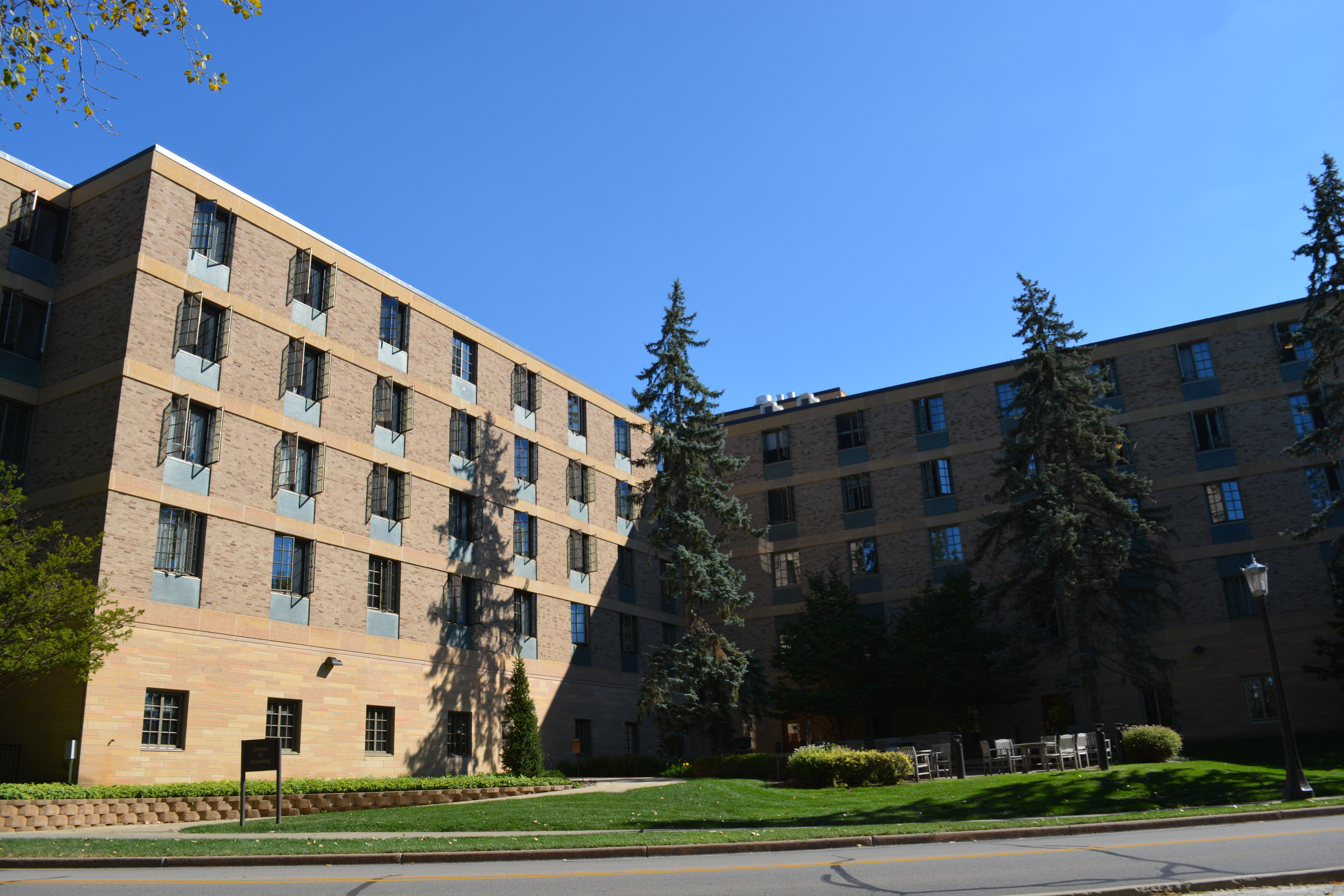
Lewis Hall giving on St. Joseph's Lake

The building features two artworks by Croatian sculptor and artist-in-residence Ivan Meštrović: a bronze crucifix in the chapel, and a Madonna and Child (1956) in the courtyard. While at Notre Dame, Mestrovic worked primarily with plaster due to his advanced age and the difficulty of handling and working with large blocks of marble or wood. Several of his works were not cast into bronze until after his death, including the Madonna and Child.

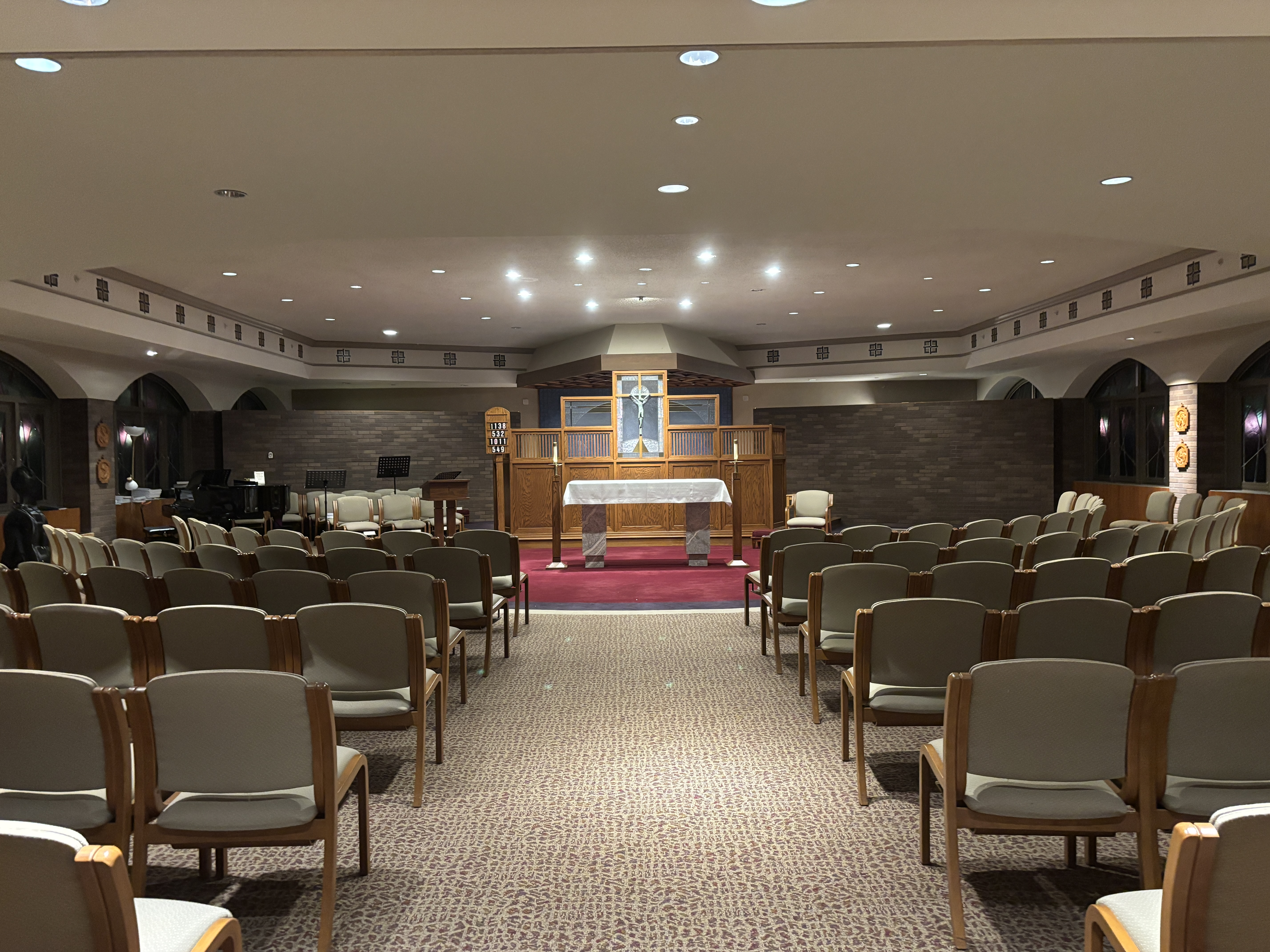
Chapel of St. Theresa of Avila in Lewis Hall

The current rector is Megan Moore. And the current Hall President is, Class of 2027, Katherine Mo.

== Traditions ==
Lewis' most famous event is Crush Week, which culminates in a dance. Lewis also sponsors a 3K race called the Crush Rush. LHOP is a hall-wide breakfast event where each floor prepares a different plate.

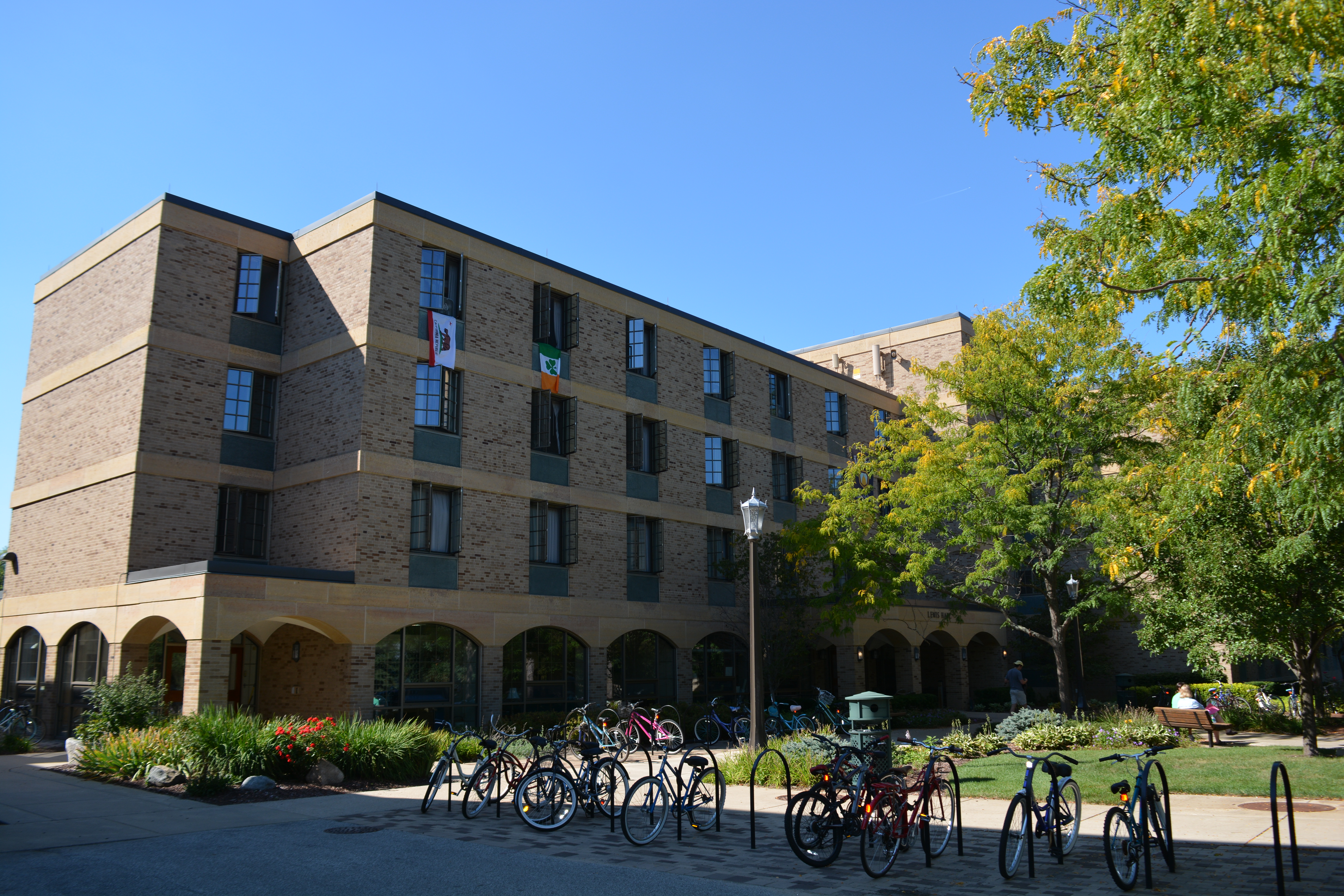
Lewis Hall

== Notable residents ==
- Condoleezza Rice '75
- Anne Thompson '79

== Room information ==
Lewis Hall has 132 rooms and features the following room configurations:

- 18 singles
- 91 doubles
- 3 triples
- 5 quads (2 double rooms attached for 4 people to live in)
- 3 "six-chicks" (2 rooms for 3 people to live in each, plus an extra large common room)
- 8 RA rooms
- 3 apartments for Hall Staff (rector and 2 ARs)
- 1 in-residence apartment (priest)
