= 2015 Nigerian Senate elections in Oyo State =

2015 Nigerian Senate election in Ogun State

The 2015 Nigerian Senate election in Ogun State held on February 28, 2015, to elect members of the Nigerian Senate to represent Oyo State. Rilwan Akanbi representing Oyo South, Monsurat Sunmonu representing Oyo Central and Abdulfatai Buhari representing Oyo North all won on the platform of the All Progressives Congress.

== Overview ==
Affiliation	Party			Total
Affiliation	APC	PDP	A	Total
Before Election	1	1	1	3
After Election	3	0	0	3

== Summary ==
District	Incumbent	Party	Elected Senator	Party
Oyo Central	Ayoade Ademola Adeseun	ACN	Monsurat Sunmonu	APC
Oyo South	Olufemi Lanlehin	A	Rilwan Akanbi	APC
Oyo North	Hosea Ayoola Agboola	PDP	Abdulfatai Buhari	APC

== Results ==
=== Oyo Central ===
APC candidate Monsurat Sunmonu won the election, defeating PDP candidate Ayoade Ademola.

2015 Nigerian Senate election in Oyo State
Party	Candidate	Votes	%
APC	Monsurat Sunmonu	-	-
PDP	Ayoade Ademola	-	-

=== Oyo South ===
APC candidate Rilwan Akanbi won the election, defeating PDP candidate Olarenwaju Otiti and A Party candidate Olufemi Lanlehin.

2015 Nigerian Senate election in Oyo State
Party	Candidate	Votes	%
APC	Rilwan Akanbi	-	-
PDP	Olarenwaju Otiti	-	-

=== Oyo North ===
APC candidate Abdulfatai Buhari won the election, defeating PDP candidate Agboola Ayoola.

2015 Nigerian Senate election in Oyo State
Party	Candidate	Votes	%
APC	Abdulfatai Buhari	-	-
PDP	Adegboola Ayoola	-	-
