= 2011 Nigerian Senate elections in Oyo State =

2011 Nigerian Senate election in Oyo State

The 2011 Nigerian Senate election in Oyo State was held on April 9, 2011, to elect members of the Nigerian Senate to represent Oyo State. Ayoade Ademola Adeseun representing Oyo Central and Hosea Ayoola Agboola representing Oyo North won on the platform of Action Congress of Nigeria, while Olufemi Lanlehin representing Oyo South on the platform of Peoples Democratic Party.

== Overview ==
Affiliation	Party		Total
Affiliation	ACN	PDP	Total
Before Election			3
After Election	2	1	3

== Summary ==
District	Incumbent	Party	Elected Senator	Party
Oyo Central			Ayoade Ademola Adeseun	ACN
Oyo North			Hosea Ayoola Agboola	ACN
Oyo South			Olufemi Lanlehin	PDP

== Results ==
=== Oyo Central ===
Action Congress of Nigeria candidate Ayoade Ademola Adeseun won the election, defeating other party candidates.

2011 Nigerian Senate election in Oyo State
Party	Candidate	Votes	%
ACN	Ayoade Ademola Adeseun		
Total votes			
ACN hold			

=== Oyo North ===
Action Congress of Nigeria candidate Hosea Ayoola Agboola won the election, defeating other party candidates.

2011 Nigerian Senate election in Oyo State
Party	Candidate	Votes	%
ACN	Hosea Ayoola Agboola		
Total votes			
ACN hold			

=== Oyo South ===
Peoples Democratic Party candidate Olufemi Lanlehin won the election, defeating party candidates.

2011 Nigerian Senate election in Oyo State
Party	Candidate	Votes	%
PDP	Olufemi Lanlehin		
Total votes			
PDP hold			
