= Breen-Phillips Hall =

American women's university hall of residence

- Residence Hall
- University of Notre Dame
- Arms: Party per pale or and argent, to the dexter a hand gules and in chief gules a star argent between two crescents of the same, and on the sinister a pig sables over wavy azure
- Campus quad: North
- Coordinates: 41.7028°N 86.2361°W
- Nickname: B-P
- Motto: Land of the Free, Home of the Babes, Best People Best Place
- Established: 1939
- Named for: William P. Breen and Frank B. Phillips
- Architect: Maginnis and Walsh
- Architectural style: Vernacular collegiate Gothic
- Colors: Blue and pink
- Gender: Female
- Brother Dorm: Keenan Hall
- Rector: Sarah Motter
- Undergraduates: 200
- Postgraduates: 2
- Chapel: Saint Francis of Assisi
- Mascot: Babes
- Charities: American Diabetes Association, Meals on Wheels, Hoops for Hope
- Major events: Bathrobe Breakfast, Meal Auction
- Website: https://breenphillipshall.weebly.com/

Map
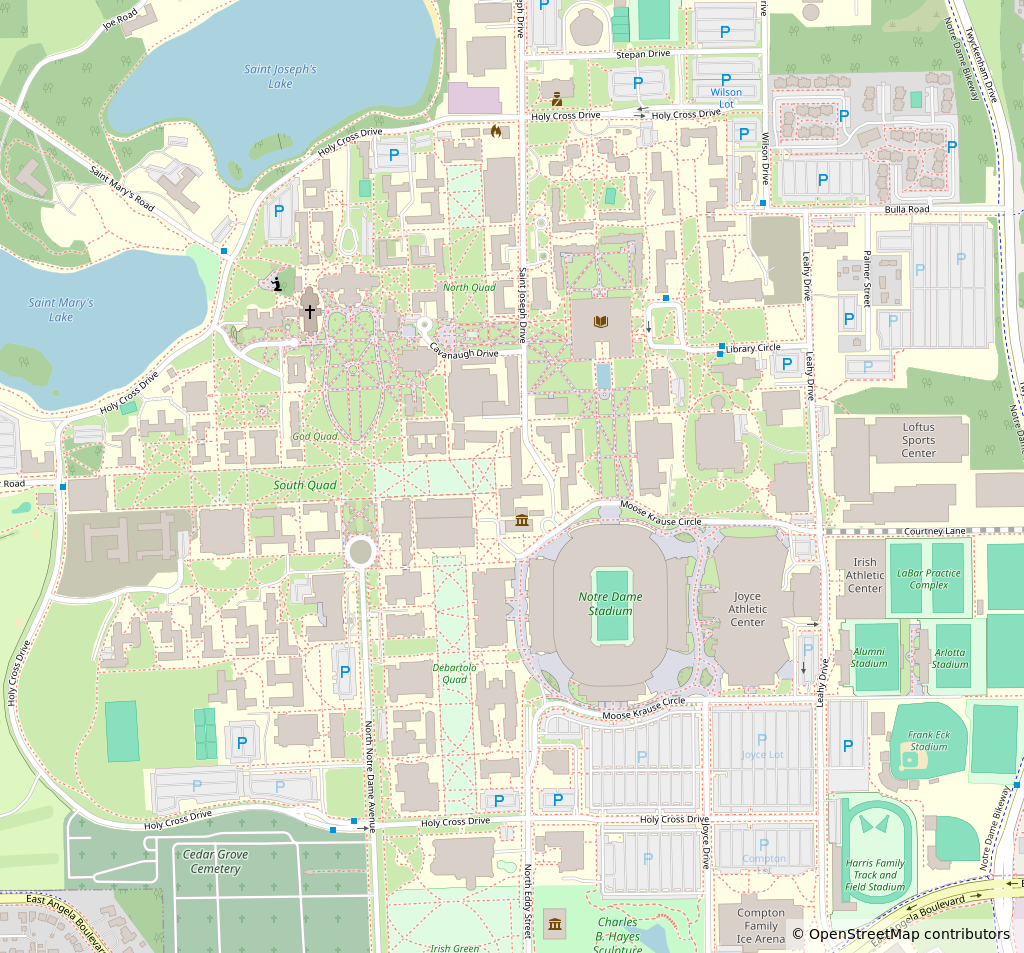
- Location within Notre Dame, Indiana

Breen-Phillips Hall is one of the 33 Residence Halls on the campus of the University of Notre Dame and one of the 15 female dorms. Breen-Phillips is on North Quad, between Farley Hall, Geddes Hall, and the Hesburgh Library. Established in 1939, it hosts approximately 200 students.

== History ==
In the 1930s, enrollment at Notre Dame was increasing by about one hundred a year, but on campus space was limited. This both forced students to live far from campus and was a loss of potential room and board income for the university. President John Francis O'Hara decided to build three new residence halls to remedy this problem: Cavanaugh in 1936, Zahm in 1937, and Breen-Phillips in 1939. These three dormitories were intended to comprise a new quadrangle, then named Freshman Quad, presently North Quad. In order to accommodate these buildings it was necessary to demolish Freshman and Sophomore Halls (which were low quality temporary structures) and the east wing of St. Edward's Hall. Breen-Phillips was built on the east end of the Fieldhouse and formed the eastern edge of the new North Quad. Groundbreaking took place on March 27, construction started May 5, and the cornerstone was laid May 5, 1939 and blessed by president O'Hara and superior general James A Burns. It was built in collegiate Gothic style (although less elaborate and ornate than Alumni and Dillon) by Boston-based architects Maginnis and Walsh, who worked on several other projects at Notre Dame. It was built in 165 days, and it was ready to host 185 freshmen on September 12 and its first rector was Rev. George Holderith, CSC.

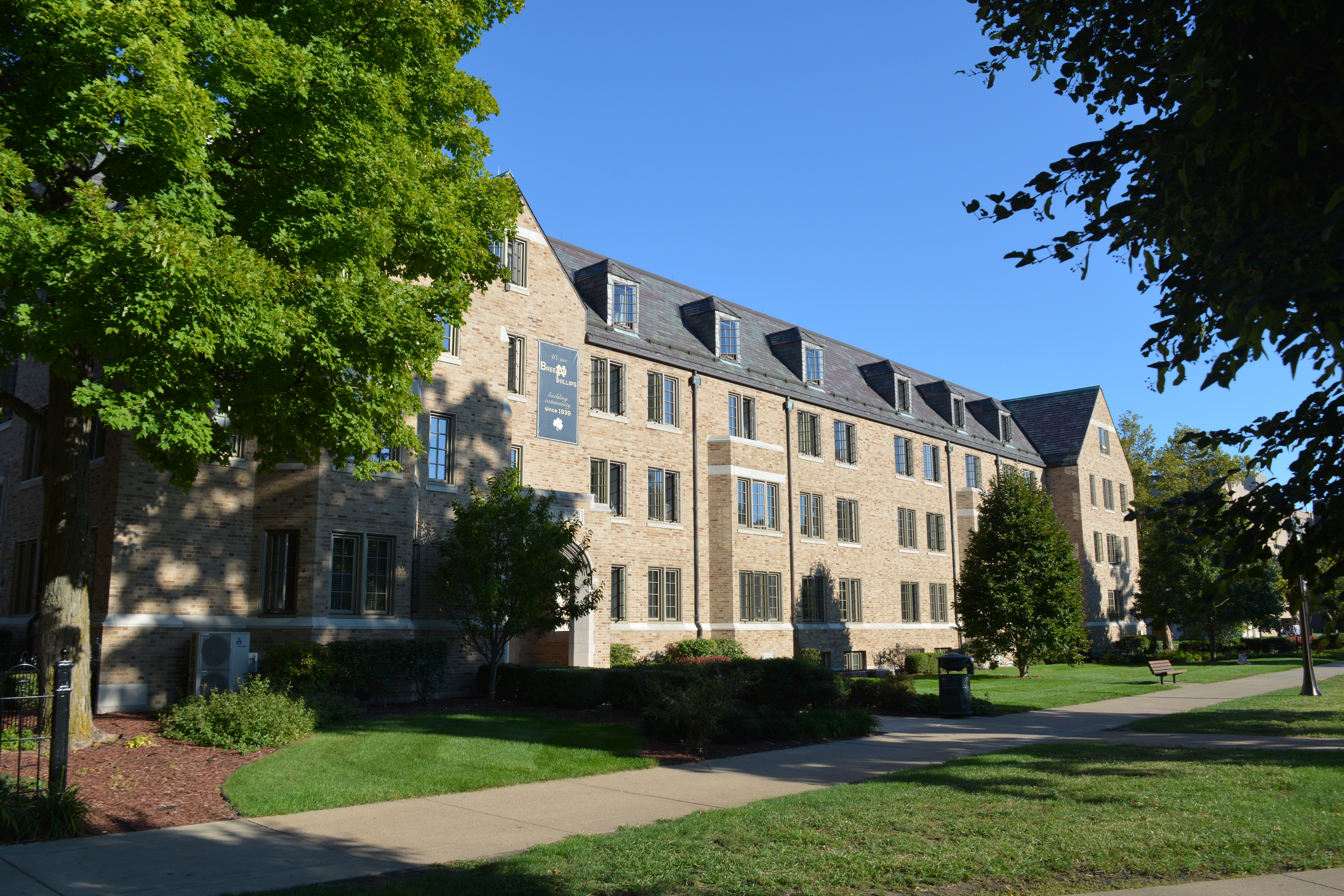
Breen-Phillips

Construction cost more than $300,000 and was donated by brothers-in-law benefactors attorney William P. Breen (class of 1877) and banker Frank B. Phillips (class of 1880), both from Fort Wayne. The university received $400,000 as a beneficiary of their estates after their deaths. Breen, who was admitted to the Indiana bar in 1879, was member of the firm Breen & Morris, member of the American Bar Association and of the Indiana Bar Association, of which he was president 1903–1904. He was also director of the Notre Dame Board of Trustees, president of the Alumni Association in 1908–1909, and benefactor of the Breen Medal for oratory.

Originally, it was a Freshman hall and it hosted the athletics department on its first floor, including the football coach Frank Leahy's office, and the football ticket office. Moose Krause's office was also hosted in Breen-Phillips. The athletic office moved in late August 1939. It was previously housed in the Main Building. The football office was moved from Breen-Phillips to Rockne Memorial in Match 1959.

It hosted naval officers during World War II when the university was used by the Navy for training purposes. During the 1960s the dorm was known as Stalag B-P, a riff on the 1953 film Stalag 17 about a German prisoner-of-war camp during World War II, in reference to the strictness of the rector of the time, who was also of German descent. In 1963, the residents of the second floor of Breen-Phillips embarked in an in-hall marathon, and for 2 days straight walked up and down their hall while tiddlywinking for a total distance of 50 miles.

It was converted in a female dorm in 1973. Renovations for the transition to a woman's dorm included increased storage facilities and more washing and drying equipment. The addition of BP as a women's dorm, together with Farley Hall, was a major step towards coeducation, increasing the female population from 360 to 775. It underwent major renovations. In 2014 it celebrated its 75th anniversary with a series of events.

The Sister Mary Catherine McNamara served as rector from 2012 to 2018, and she held Bachelor of Science from St. John College of Cleveland and a Master of Science in Education from the University of Akron. The current rector is Angie Hollar, a Mishawaka native who earned a bachelor's degree in Social Work from Saint Mary's College in 2011 and then entered the Advanced Standing Master of Social Work program at the University of Pennsylvania, followed by a Master of Divinity degree at the Jesuit School of Theology at Santa Clara University.

The hall underwent a major renovation in 2023–2024, during which the residents lived in the swing hall Zahm Hall. Sarah Motter became the new rector in 2023.

=== Description ===
The hall is a four-story brick building built in vernacular collegiate Gothic architecture, but without elaborate decorations found in other neo-Gothic buildings such as Alumni or Morrissey. The basement features a 24-Hour Hang-Out Space (the Pen), a Kitchen, a Study room, a Pink 'cafe' room (mainly used for studying and meetings). a Workout room (treadmills, ellipticals, weights, etc.), a Laundry room, and a Movie room (movies, TV, & books!). The chapel, dedicated to Francis of Assisi, is located on the 1st floor. It has entrances on each side of the building, facing Farley Hall, North Quad, and the Fieldhouse mall. It is staffed by one rector, two assistant rectors, and six resident assistants, one for each of the six sections.

== Notable residents ==
- James Wetherbee – astronaut
- Eric Wieschaus – biologist awarded Nobel Prize in Medicine
- Alexander Haig
- Christine Greig
- Dava Newman
- Carl Yastrzemski
- Courtney Hurley
- Kelley Hurley
