= 2019 Nigerian Senate elections in Oyo State =

2019 Nigerian Senate election in Oyo State

The 2019 Nigerian Senate election in Oyo State was held on 23 February 2019, to elect members of the Nigerian Senate to represent Oyo State. Abdulfatai Buhari representing Oyo North and Teslim Folarin representing Oyo Central won on the platform of the All Progressives Congress while Kola Balogun representing Oyo South won on the platform of the Peoples Democratic Party.

== Overview ==
Affiliation	Party			Total
Affiliation	APC	PDP	ADC	Total
Before Election	1	0	2	3
After Election	2	1	0	3

== Summary ==
District	Incumbent	Party	Elected Senator	Party
Oyo North	Abdulfatai Buhari	APC	Abdulfatai Buhari	APC
Oyo Central	Monsurat Sunmonu	ADC	Teslim Folarin	APC
Oyo South	Soji Akanbi	ADC	Kola Balogun	PDP

== Results ==
=== Oyo North ===
A total of 18 candidates registered with the Independent National Electoral Commission to contest in the election. APC candidate Abdulfatai Buhari won the election, defeating PDP candidate Mulikat Akande Adeola and 16 other party candidates. Abdulfatai Buhari of APC received 37.12% of the votes, while Mulikat Akande Adeola received 30.81%.

2019 Nigerian Senate election in Oyo State
Party	Candidate	Votes	%
APC	Abdulfatai Buhari	107,703	37.12%
PDP	Mulikat Akande-Adeola	89,365	30.81%
Others		93,021	32.07%
Total votes		290,089	100%
APC hold			

=== Oyo Central ===
A total of 21 candidates registered with the Independent National Electoral Commission to contest in the election. APC candidate Teslim Folarin won the election, defeating PDP candidate Bisi Ilaka, the incumbent and ADC candidate, Monsurat Sunmonu and 18 other party candidates. Folarin received 33.43% of the votes, while Ilaka received 30.68%.

2019 Nigerian Senate election in Oyo State
Party	Candidate	Votes	%
APC	Teslim Folarin	91,080	33.43%
PDP	Bisi Ilaka	83,600	30.68%
Others		97,801	35.89%
Total votes		272,481	100%
APC hold			

=== Oyo South ===
A total of 21 candidates registered with the Independent National Electoral Commission to contest in the election. PDP candidate Kola Balogun won the election, defeating APC candidate Abiola Ajimobi and 19 other party candidates. Balogun received 37.55% of the votes, while Ajimobi received 32.76%.

2019 Nigerian Senate election in Oyo State
Party	Candidate	Votes	%
PDP	Kola Balogun	105,720	37.55%
APC	Abiola Ajimobi	92,218	32.76%
Others		83,581	29.69%
Total votes		281,519	100%
PDP hold			
