= Baumer Hall =

Residence hall at the University of Notre Dame

- Residential Hall
- University of Notre Dame
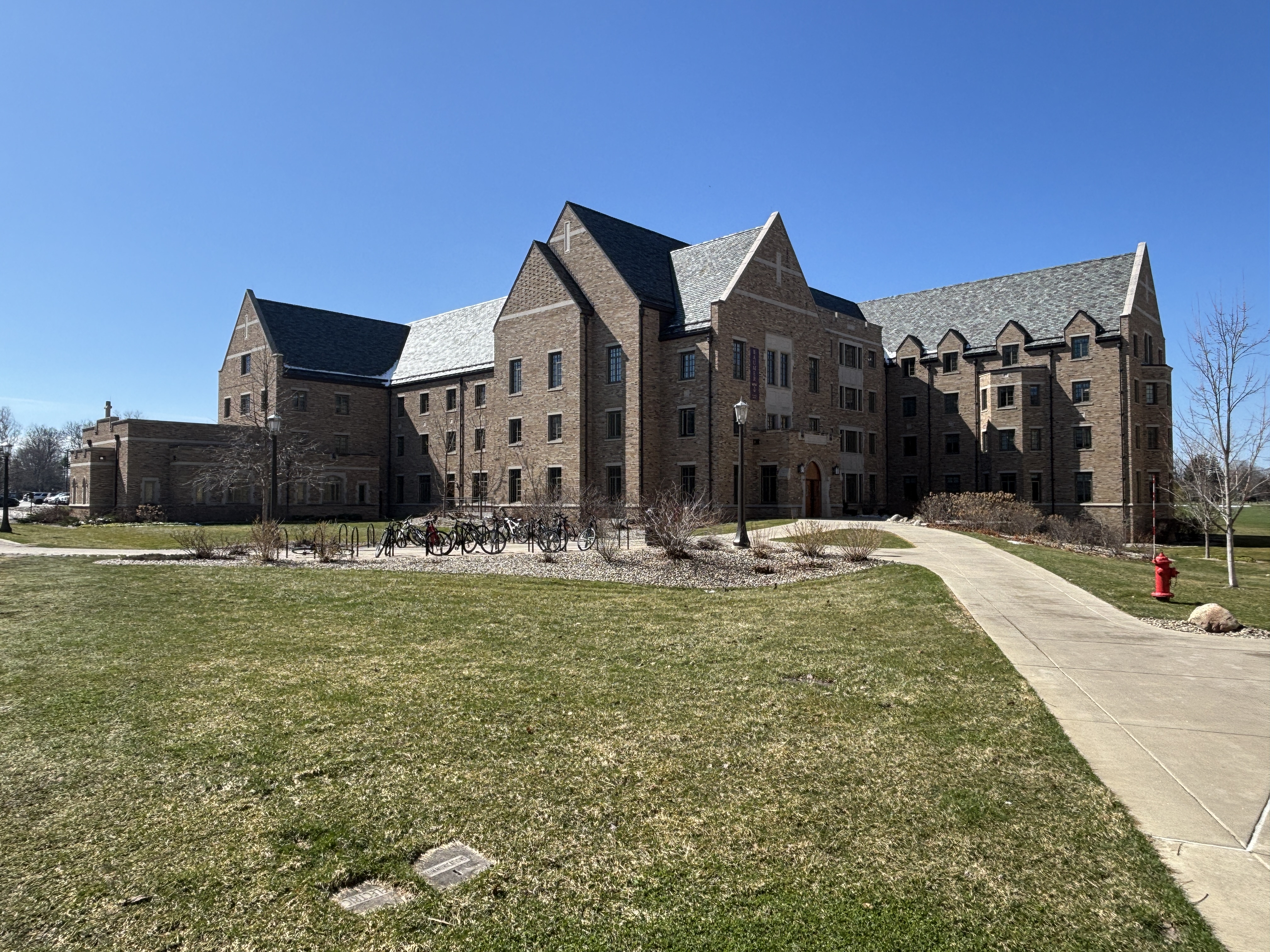

- Arms: Murrey in chief two bars wavy or in base an anchor or
- Campus quad: West
- Coordinates: 41.6970°N 86.2413°W
- Motto: Per Ardua ad Spes (Latin)
- Motto in English: Through adversity to hope
- Established: 2019
- Named for: John Baumer
- Architect: Goody Clancy
- Architectural style: modernist Collegiate Gothic
- Colors: Burgundy and gold
- Gender: Male
- Rector: Rev. T.J. Groden, C.S.C.
- Undergraduates: 250
- Postgraduates: 2 (serving as Assistant Rectors)
- Chapel: Martin de Porres
- Mascot: Buccaneers
- Sports: Baseball, basketball, bowling, cross country, dodgeball, football, golf, hockey, lacrosse, racquetball, soccer, table tennis, tennis, volleyball

Map
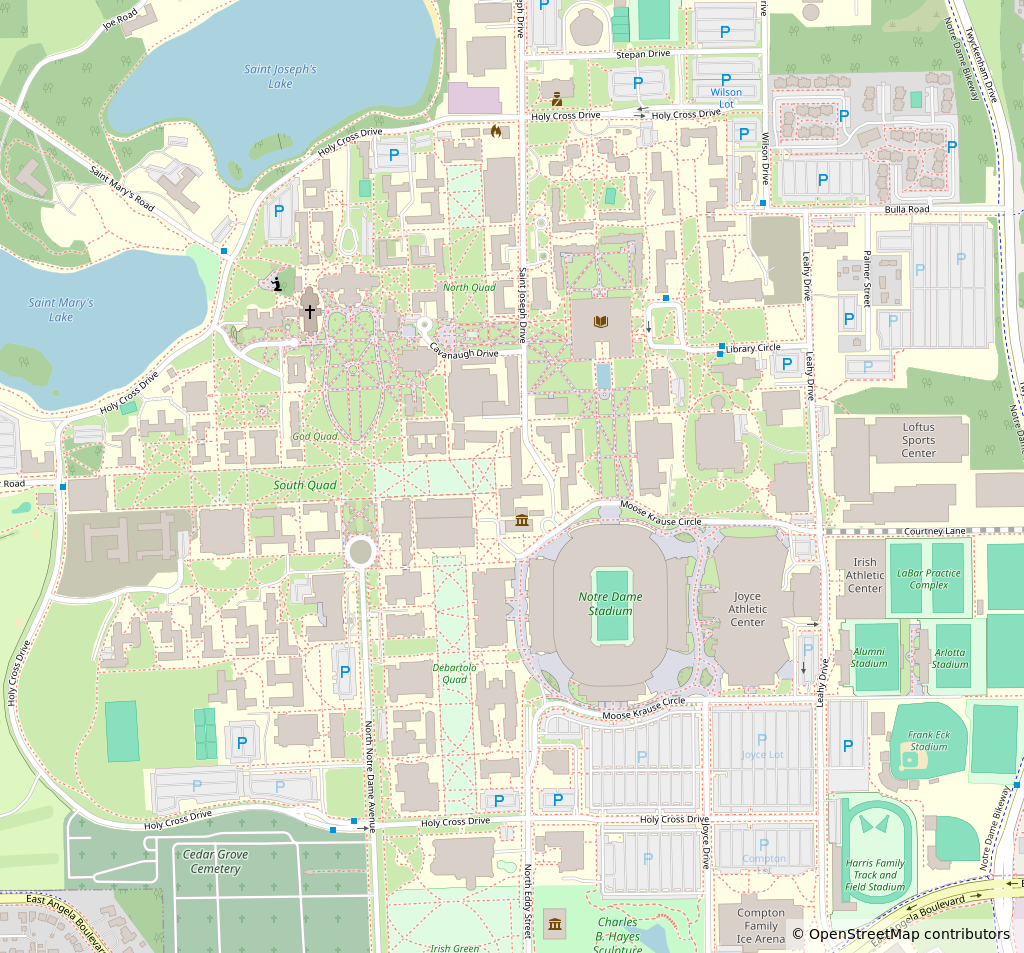
- Location within Notre Dame, Indiana

Baumer Hall is one of the 32 residence halls at the University of Notre Dame. It located on West Quad, south of Keough Hall and west of Ryan Hall, on the McGlinn fields (also known as Baumer Bay). It was built in 2019, after a donation from John and Mollie Baumer. Baumer Hall is the proud home of the buccaneers.

== History ==
The hall was constructed thanks to a $20 million donation from John and Mollie Baumer. it was built to alleviate overcrowding of the present halls and expand the capacity of the campus. Born in South Bend, John Baumer is a 1990 Notre Dame finance graduate and lived in Zahm Hall, and later attended University of Pennsylvania's Wharton School. Baumer's father, Fred Baumer, was comptroller for the University of Notre Dame for twenty-one years. Currently, a senior partner at private equity firm Leonard Green & Partners. Baumer made a financial gift of $3 million to endow the coaching position for the Notre Dame Fighting Irish men's lacrosse. He is also a member of Notre Dame's Campaign Cabinet, the Wall Street Committee, and the university's President's Circle, Rite Aid Corp, Petco Animal Supplies, FTD Group and Equinox Fitness. Mollie Baumer attended Saint Mary's College and the couple lives in California.

Construction started November 2017 and was completed in August 2019. It was built to attain LEED silver certification. For the 2019–2020 school year, the Dillon Hall community lived in Baumer while Dillon was under renovation.

Baumer Hall opened as its own community in 2020, amidst the COVID-19 pandemic. Its first rector is Robert Lisowski, C.S.C., also known as "The Admiral,” who served from 2020 until the end of the 2023–24 academic year. Lisowski, from Scranton, earned his undergraduate degree from St. John's University and entered the Congregation of Holy Cross in 2014, served as an assistant rector for Dillon Hall in 2019, and completed his Master of Divinity at Notre Dame in May 2020. He was ordained to the priesthood on April 10, 2021. Following Lisowski, Rev. Thomas J. (T.J.) Groden, C.S.C., serves as the current rector. Groden was an assistant rector in Dillon Hall for the 2024–2025 academic year. He entered formation with Holy Cross in 2019, professed final vows in 2025, and was ordained a priest in April 2026.

The dorm developed a rivalry with the nearby Duncan Hall. The dorm sponsored a plasma donation drive to benefit the South Bend Medical Foundation in its fight against COVID-19.

In January 2022, the hall received LEED gold certification.

Since its inception in 2020, Baumer Hall has developed several traditions, including Baumer Boo, where the dorm is turned into a haunted house to raise funds for the homeless; Buc-an-Ear, a corn sale for charity; and VoyageFest, a campus-wide music festival. Baumer Hall residents also consistently sit at the head table at South Dining Hall, nicknaming the table, "The Jesus Table."

== Description ==
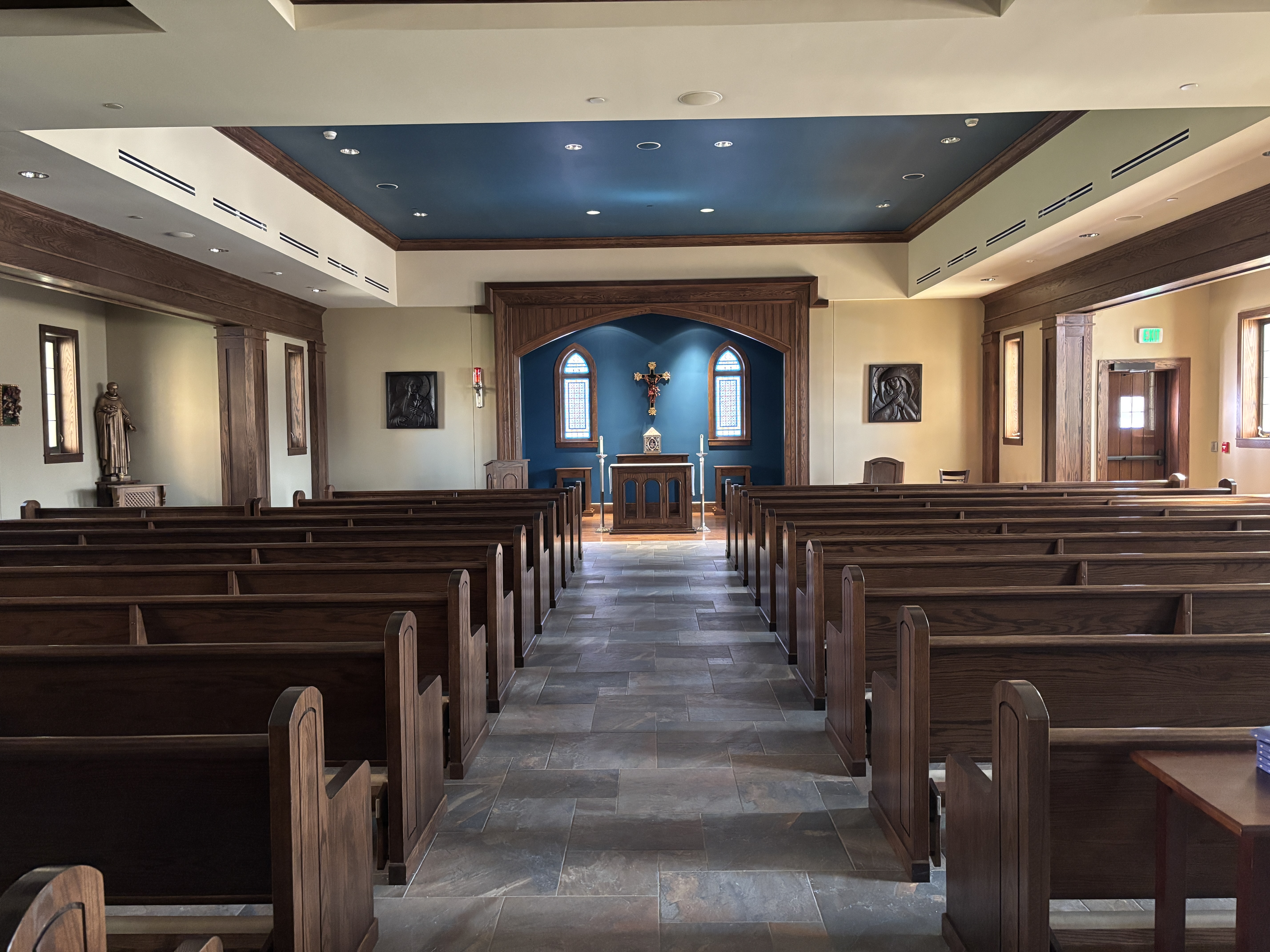
The chapel of St. Martin de Porres in Baumer Hall

The Hall is four-stories high and 78,000 square feet. It features a two-story common lounge, a reading room, communal kitchens, a chapel, a laundry room, a vending area, storage space, a food sales operation known as Smuggler's Cove, and a gym. The architecture of the Hall reflects the university's modernist collegiate Gothic style. The chapel, dedicated to St. Martin de Porres, was designed with clean Gothic architecture, indigenous art, and wood detailing.
