= Mohammed Kola Balogun =

Nigerian politician (born 1956)

Senator for Oyo South
- In office 11 June 2019 – 11 June 2023
- Preceded by: Rilwan Akanbi
- Succeeded by: Sharafadeen Alli

Personal details
- Born: 27 July 1956 (age 69)
- Party: All Progressives Congress
- Other political affiliations: People's Democratic Party
- Education: University of North Texas
- Profession: Politician

Mohammed Kola Balogun (born 27 July 1956) also referred to as KMB is a Nigerian politician who served as senator representing Oyo South senatorial district from 2019 to 2023. He defeated incumbent governor of Oyo State Abiola Ajimobi of the APC at the 2019 senate elections.

== Life ==
Kola Balogun was born into the family of Ibrahim Ayinde Balogun and Awawu Adunni. He is married to Gbonju Kola-Balogun and they have children.

== Educational background ==
Kola Balogun had his primary education at Ratibu Muslim Primary School, Oluyoro, Ibadan. His secondary education was at St. Peters College, Abeokuta, Ogun State. He had his University degree at the North Texas State University, Denton, Texas.
