= Luqman Oyebisi Ilaka =

Nigerian politician (born 1961)

Oyo State Chief of Staff
- Incumbent
- Assumed office May 2019
- Appointed by: Governor Seyi Makinde
- Preceded by: Dr. Gbade Ojo

Personal details
- Born: 21 December 1961 (age 64) Oyo, Oyo State, Nigeria
- Citizenship: Nigeria
- Party: Peoples Democratic Party (PDP)
- Parent(s): Chief Lasisi Oyedokun and Chief Mrs Ilaka of Ilaka
- Education: Obafemi Awolowo University; University of London
- Occupation: Politician
- Committees: Oyo State Executive Council Member

Luqman Oyebisi Ilaka (born 21 December 1961) is a Nigerian politician, businessman, legal and taxation consultant and philanthropist. He was appointed the Oyo State Chief of Staff under the administration of Governor Seyi Makinde from 2019 to 2021 under the People's Democratic Party (PDP).

== Early life and education ==
Ilaka was born on 21 December 1961, to the family of Lasisi Oyedokun Ilaka. He is a native of Oyo State, Nigeria where he attended his primary education at Grange School, Ikeja, Lagos State and Government College, Ibadan (1973–1977) for his secondary school.

Ilaka was admitted to Obafemi Awolowo University, Ile-Ife in 1978. He subsequently enrolled at the University of London and obtained a LLB (Hons). He also attended the College of Law, Lancaster Gate, London in 1990. In 1993, he proceeded to the Chartered Institute of Taxation of England and Wales where he became an Associate member. He is a Fellow of the Chartered Institute of Insurance; and qualified as a Mortgage Advance Planner of the same institute.

== Career ==
=== Political career ===
Ilaka joined Senator Rashidi Ladoja at the inception of Accord Party just three months before the 2011 election and contested as senator to represent Oyo Central Senatorial District where he emerged the first runner up, an election which was won by the now defunct Action Congress of Nigeria (ACN) candidate, Senator Ayoade Ademola Adeseun.

Ilaka also contested in the 2015 election for the same Oyo Central Senatorial District on the platform of the Accord party with 84,675 votes but lost to Senator Monsurat Sunmonu of the All Progressive Congress (APC) who won with 105,378 votes.

Chief Luqman Ilaka was the senatorial candidate of the People's Democratic Party, PDP in the 2019 National Assembly election which was won by Senator Teslim Folarin of the All Progressives Congress (APC). Senator Teslim scored 91,080 votes to defeat Chief Oyebisi Ilaka who secured 83,600 votes.

In 2019, the Executive Governor of Oyo State, Engineer Seyi Makinde made his first appointment in office by appointing Chief Oyebisi Ilaka as his chief of staff. His appointment as the chief of staff to the governor of Oyo State was the first executive action of Governor Seyi Makinde.

He was a member of the board of directors for the Nigeria Deposit Insurance Corporation (NDIC) from 2009 till 2015.

=== Other ventures ===
Between 1994 and 1997, he worked for Guardian Royal Exchange Assurance, a large British insurance company where he served as a Tax/Financial Consultant dealing with life assurance, investments, inheritance tax and mortgage cases.

He worked as a partner in Salfiti and Co Solicitors based in London particularly, land, trust and commercial cases. He was later engaged as an associate partner in the Jacob Rothschild Partnership.

== Traditional title ==
He was conferred with the prestigious title of 'Ladilu of Oyo Kingdom' by His Royal Highness, Oba Lamidi Adeyemi III, Alaafin of Oyo in 2006.
