= Sadoluwa Dolu Lanlehin =

Nigerian prince (born 1987)

Omoba Sadoluwa "Dolu" Lanlehin
- Dolu Lanlehin at graduation from the University of Notre Dame, pictured with father and brother
- Born: Sadoluwa Opoola Lanlehin; 23 October 1987 (age 38)
- Other name: Dolu
- Education: University of Notre Dame
- Occupation: Civil Engineer
- Spouse: Tayo Olabiran (m 2018)

Sadoluwa "Dolu" Opoola Lanlehin (born October 23, 1987) is a Nigerian prince.

== Family history ==
Lanlehin was born in the southern city of Lagos, Nigeria. Lanlehin's grandfather, Chief S. O. Lanlehin, was a major chieftain in Ibadan and a founding leader of the Ibadan Peoples Party. His uncle, Olufemi Lanlehin, is currently serving as the senator of Oyo State's South district in Nigeria's National Assembly.

== Formal education ==
Sadoluwa Lanlehin attended Loyola Jesuit College, a prominent Jesuit boarding school in the federal capital, Abuja. He attended university abroad at the University of Notre Dame in the United States, where he studied Civil Engineering. In 2015, Lanlehin received a Master of Business Administration from INSEAD.

== Career ==
Lanlehin began his career working as a mechanical engineer. After receiving his MBA degree, he was employed as a consultant at Bain & Company for several years. He is currently a director at Chegg leading strategic initiatives.

== Latvian ambassadorship ==
During his undergraduate education at the University of Notre Dame, Lanlehin formed a close friendship with Christopher Doughty, nephew of Latvian Secretary of State Andris Teikmanis. Lanlehin has worked toward fostering Latvian-Nigerian relations, and after visiting Latvia and meeting Teikmanis, helped organize a Latvian trade mission to Nigeria that resulted in a pledge toward greater trade partnership between the two countries.
