= Rilwan Akanbi =

Nigerian politician and former senator

Senator Rilwan Adesoji Akanbi

Senator for Oyo South
- In office 29 May 2015 – 29 May 2019
- Preceded by: Olufemi Lanlehin
- Succeeded by: Mohammed Kola Balogun

Personal details
- Born: 6 May 1962 (age 64) Ibadan, Oyo State, Nigeria
- Party: All Progressives Congress
- Profession: Politician

Rilwan Adesoji Akanbi (born 6 May 1962), popularly known as Soji Akanbi, is a Nigerian politician who represented Oyo South Senatorial District in the Senate of Nigeria from 2015 to 2019 on the platform of the All Progressives Congress.

== Political career ==
Akanbi previously served in the House of Representatives during the Nigerian Third Republic under the Social Democratic Party (SDP). He later served as Special Adviser on Industrial and Economic Matters to Governor Lam Adesina of Oyo State.

In the 2015 general election, Akanbi was elected Senator representing Oyo South Senatorial District on the platform of the All Progressives Congress. During his tenure in the Senate, he served as Vice Chairman of the Senate Committee on Solid Minerals.

In September 2018, he defected from the APC to the African Democratic Congress (ADC).

In 2017, he was conferred with the traditional title of Okanlomo of Ibadanland by the Olubadan of Ibadanland.
