= Robert F. Griffin =

American Catholic priest and columnist

Robert F. Griffin, CSC (October 7, 1925 – October 20, 1999) was a Catholic Priest for the Congregation of Holy Cross at the University of Notre Dame.

== Early life, family and education ==
Robert "Griff" Griffin was born in Portland, Maine, to a Baptist family. He attended Deering High School.

He graduated from the University of Notre Dame in 1949. A convert to Catholicism, he entered the novitiate upon graduation and was ordained a priest for the Eastern Province of the Congregation of Holy Cross in 1954. He received a master's degree in English from Notre Dame in 1957 and did graduate work at Boston University.

== Career ==
After Boston, Griffin joined the faculty of Stonehill College in Easton, Massachusetts. He returned to Notre Dame to serve as assistant rector of Keenan Hall in 1967 and became rector of Keenan in 1969. He was appointed in 1974 to the newly created post of University chaplain, serving until health problems forced his retirement.

During his time at Notre Dame, "Griff" became famous for presiding at a popular "Urchin Mass" for children and their parents on campus. He hosted a Saturday morning children's radio program The Children's Hour on the college's student-run radio station, WSND-FM. In 1973 he was elected Notre Dame's Senior Class Fellow, an honor which had until then been reserved for nationally prominent people. He spent summers ministering to the homeless of Greenwich Village in New York City.

Griffin was known widely for his weekly column "Everyday Spirituality" in Our Sunday Visitor or his column "Letters to a Lonely God" in the Notre Dame student newspaper The Observer. His essays appear in three collections: In The Kingdom of the Lonely God, I Never Said I Didn't Love You, and The Continuing Conversation.
