= St. Edward's Hall =

Residence hall at the University of Notre Dame

- University of Notre Dame
- Arms: Vert a cross flory between five martlets Or
- Campus quad: Main
- Motto: For Hall and King
- Established: 1929, built 1882
- Colors: Green and Gold
- Gender: Male
- Rector: Rev. Ralph Haag, C.S.C.
- Undergraduates: 161
- Chapel: St. Edward the Confessor
- Mascot: Gentlemen, Stedsmen, Big Cats
- Sports: Baseball, Basketball, Bowling, Cross Country, Dodgeball, Football, Golf, Hockey, Lacrosse, Racquetball, Soccer, Table Tennis, Tennis, Ultimate Frisbee, Volleyball
- Charities: Lakeview High School, Jinga, Uganda
- Major events: Founder's Week, Yacht Dance, Mullets Against Malaria
- Website: steds.nd.edu
- St. Edward's Hall
- U.S. Historic district – Contributing property
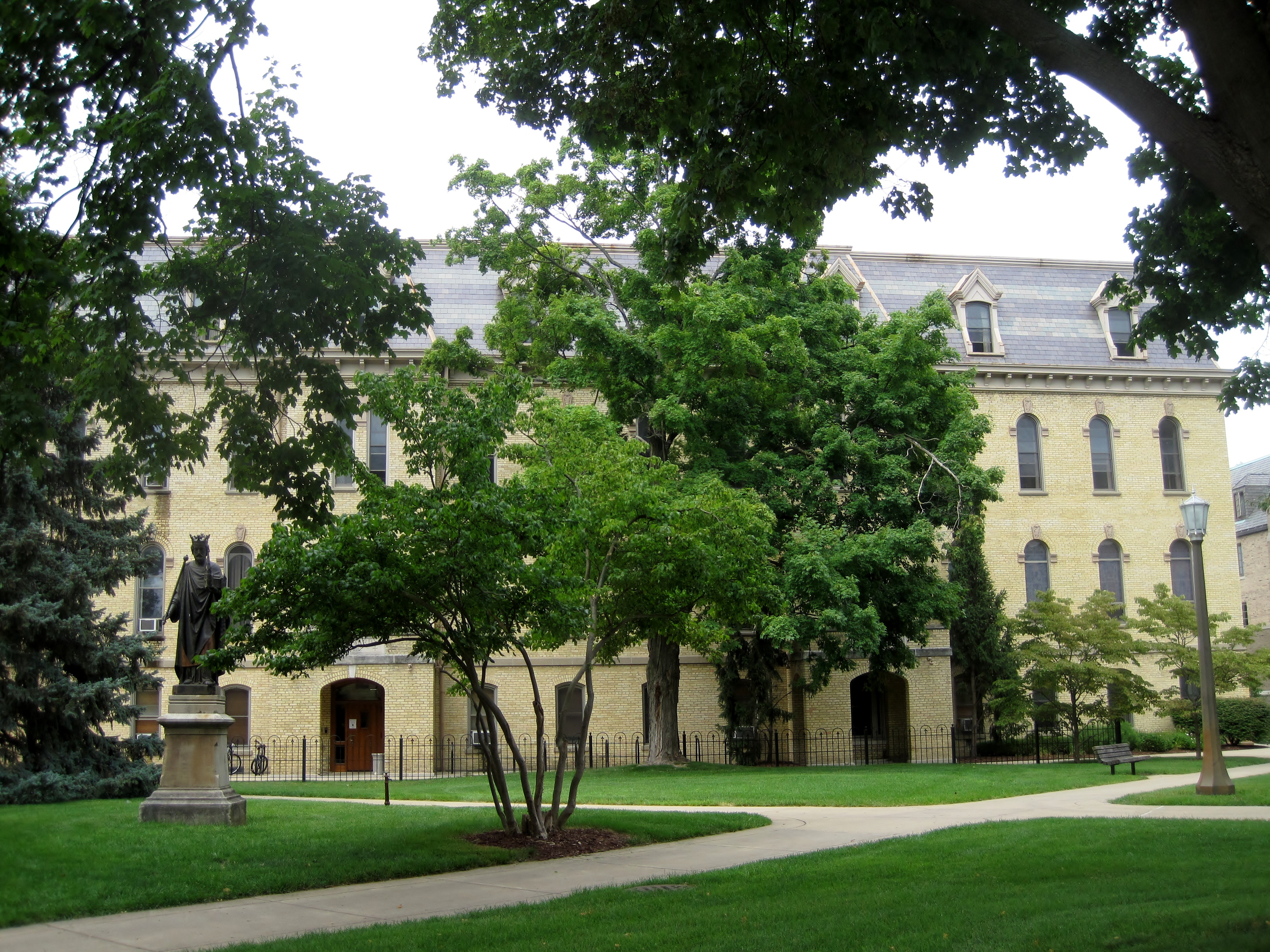

- Location within Indiana
- Location: Notre Dame, Indiana
- Coordinates: 41°42′12″N 86°14′17″W
- Built: 1882
- Architects: Father Edward Sorin and Brother Charles Harding
- Architectural style: Second Empire architecture
- Part of: University of Notre Dame: Main and South Quadrangles (ID78000053)
- Added to NRHP: May 23, 1978

St. Edward's Hall (also referred to as St. Ed's or Steds) is one of the 33 Residence Halls on the campus of the University of Notre Dame and one of seventeen male dormitories. Saint Edward's Hall is located directly east of the Main Administration Building and is directly west of Zahm Hall and houses 162 undergraduate students. St. Edward's Hall is the oldest dorm at the University of Notre Dame. The building itself was built in 1882 to house the minims, Notre Dame's boarding school program. When such program was discontinued in 1929, the building was converted to an undergraduate residence hall, which it has been ever since. Together with other historical structures of the university, it is on the National Register of Historic Places. The coat of arms is the Cross of Saint Edward the Confessor on a green background.

== History ==
St. Edwards Hall with the minims extension to the right, in 1891

Matthew J. Walsh decided to build Saint Edward's Hall in 1882 to house the boarding school for the minims program, ages six to thirteen, which was growing and reached a population of a 100 in 1883. The hall was designed by Charles Harding, C.S.C, in Notre Dame yellow brick in French style, with a Mansard roof and named after Edward Sorin's patron saint. The cornerstone was laid on 20 April 1882 by Sorin himself. It had dormitories, classrooms, recreation rooms, refectory, and a manicured lawn in front of the building. An annex was built on the east side of the hall in 1898 to make room for a gym, a roller skating rink, and more classrooms. In 1925, Knute Rockne received his First Holy Communion in the Chapel of Saint Edward the Confessor.

In 1929 president Charles L. O’Donnell decided to abandon the boarding school program, and the hall was converted into an undergraduate residence hall (since the college population was growing and space badly needed) under the direction of professor and architect Vincent Fagan in June 1929. The open dormitory was converted into double rooms, while the chapel was left untouched, and it opened in September to house 207 undergraduates. The hall's first rector was Raymond Clancy, C.S.C. The building annex was demolished to make space for Zahm Hall in 1937. The facade received minor renovations in 1976.

On 25 June 1980 when a fire broke out around 9 AM and engulfed the roof and the fourth floor of the building, likely caused by workers who were installing a sprinkler system. Four firemen were injured in fighting the blaze and the fire was put out by 11:30 AM. No students were in the building since the semester had ended, and the only resident was the rector Fr. Mario Pedi. The fire resulted in extensive damage, although the Luigi Gregori fresco on the second floor and the stained glass windows were saved. The university decided to restore the hall (which was 98 years old at the time) instead of demolishing and building a new one, and reconstruction started on October 1. While the hall was being rebuilt, the 124 residents of St. Edward's had to be assigned to makeshift housing in portions of Grace, Flanner, and Columba Halls. The intramural teams for the hall were kept during that time, in order to maintain hall spirit alive. During reconstruction, the two story, detached annex to the north was torn down, and replaced by a four-story addition in style matching the rest of the hall with a French mansard roof. The addition gave the building its current L shape. The old annex, while not damaged by the fire, was in poor state. The renovated building, which featured expanded social and study spaces, improved stairwells, and an elevator, housed 187 students compared to the 134 before the fire. The cost of the project was 2 million dollars, 1 million of which had come from insurance.

Saint Edward's Hall's signature annual event is Founder's Week. It is celebrated during the week of October 13 and it includes a badminton tournament, historical lectures, a festival in St. Edward's Park, and a special dormitory Mass. There is also an annual spring excursion to Chicago, the Yacht Dance, in which the Gentlemen take part in a dance aboard a chartered yacht. St. Ed's main dorm rivalry is with Sorin Hall.

Fr. Ralph Haag, C.S.C., is the current rector of Saint Edward's Hall.

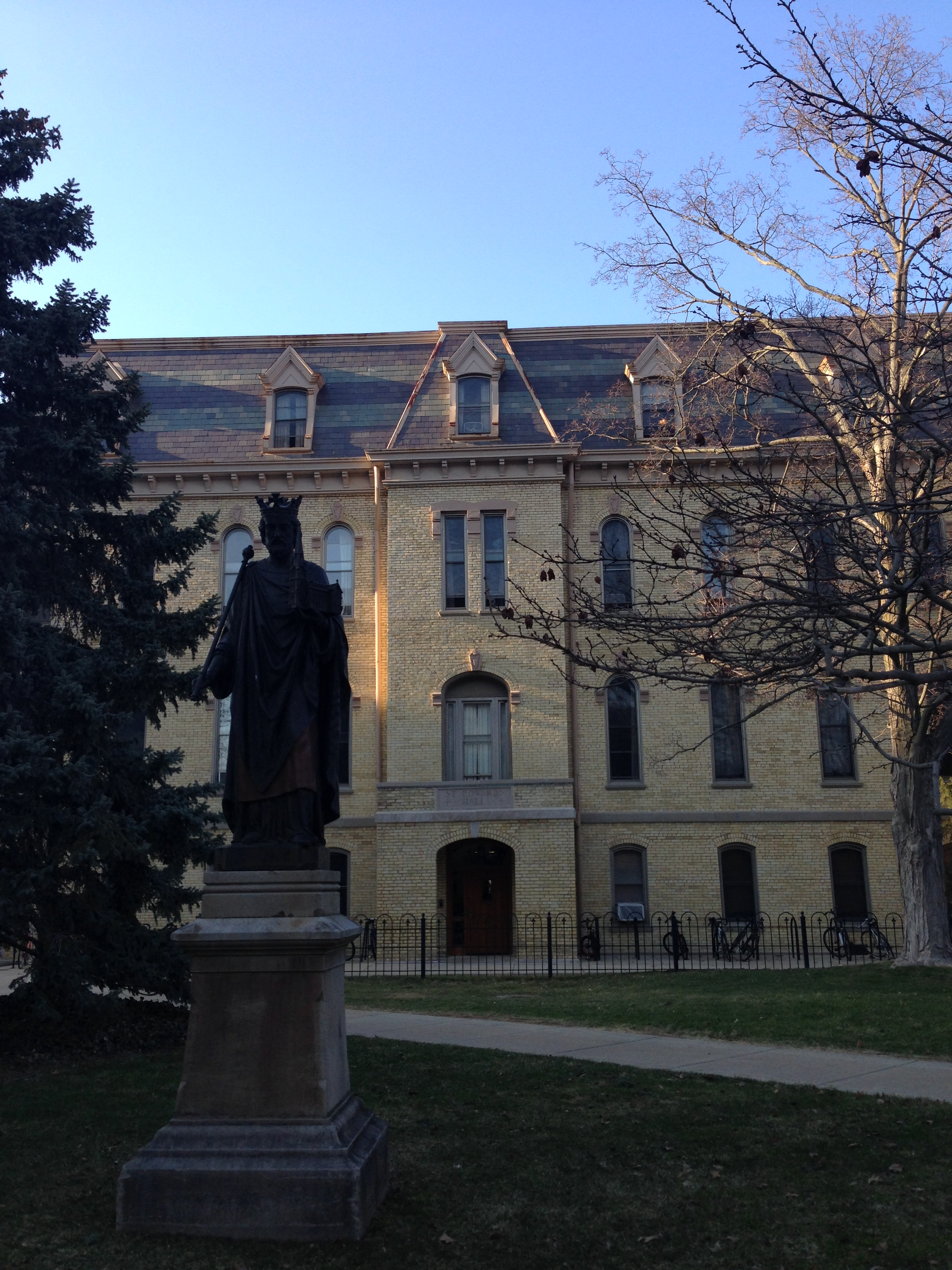
St. Edward's statue

== Description ==
The building is in Second Empire style.

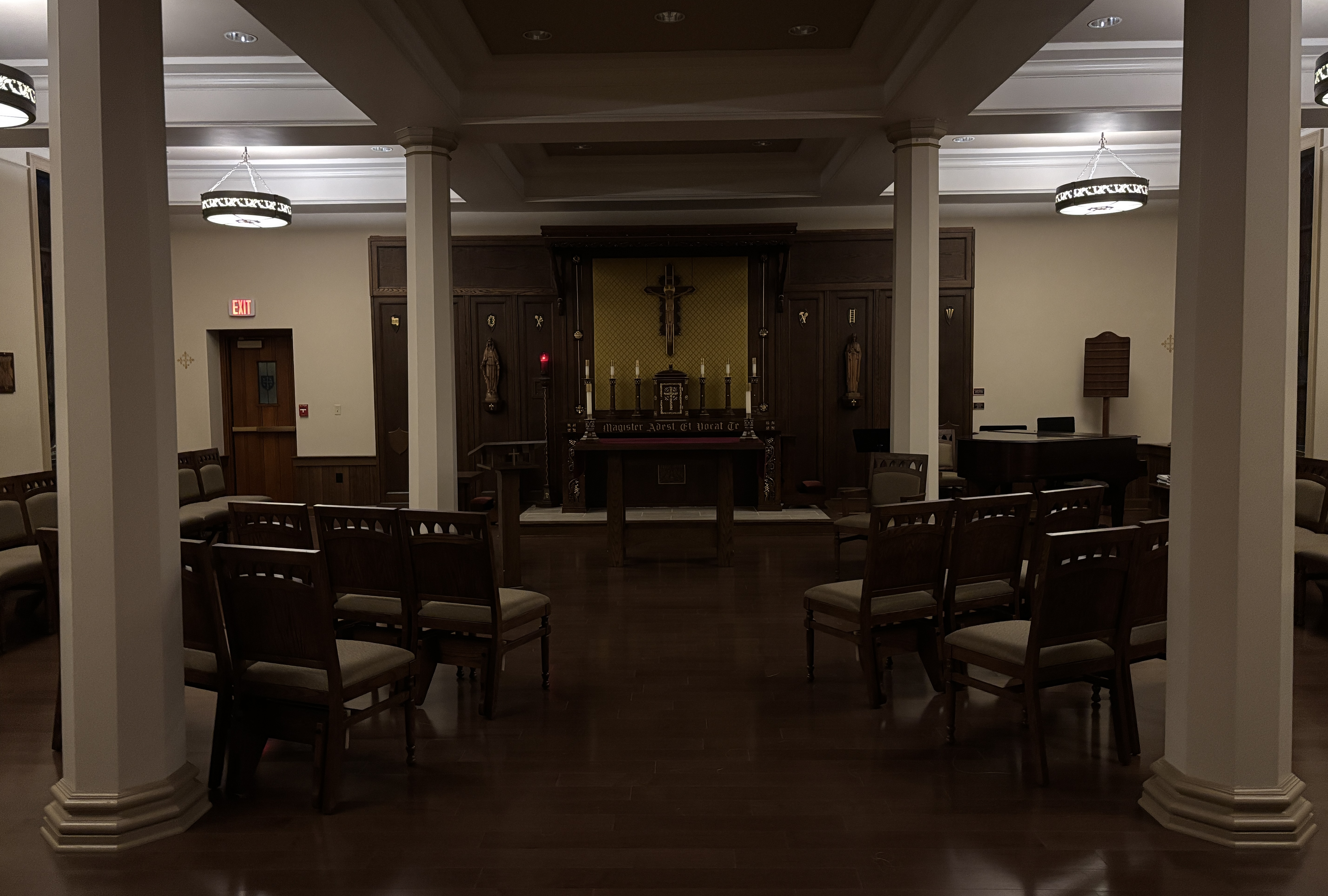
Chapel of St. Edward the Confessor in St. Edward's Hall

The Chapel of St. Edward the Confessor contains eight stained glass windows depicting various saints, Saints Edward, Anthony, and Andrew, while the other five show scenes from the life of Jesus. The glass was produced by the Carmelite stained glass atelier in Le Mans. Two were designed by Eugène Hucher and sons studios 1888 and four by his student Albert Echivard in 1912. The same French company also completed a large stained glass portrait of the university's founder Father Edward Sorin, which is found in the central stairwell. In addition, St. Edward's second floor has a mural by the Vatican muralist Luigi Gregori, whose work also adorns the Main Building, and the Basilica of the Sacred Heart. The mural depicts a meeting between Father Sorin and the local Native Americans at the founding of the university in 1842. The residence hall is the oldest building on campus currently in use as an undergraduate dormitory, and its original wing is constructed of the signature yellow bricks dredged by Holy Cross religious from the marl found in the university's two lakes.

Stained Glass Windows in St. Edward's Hall
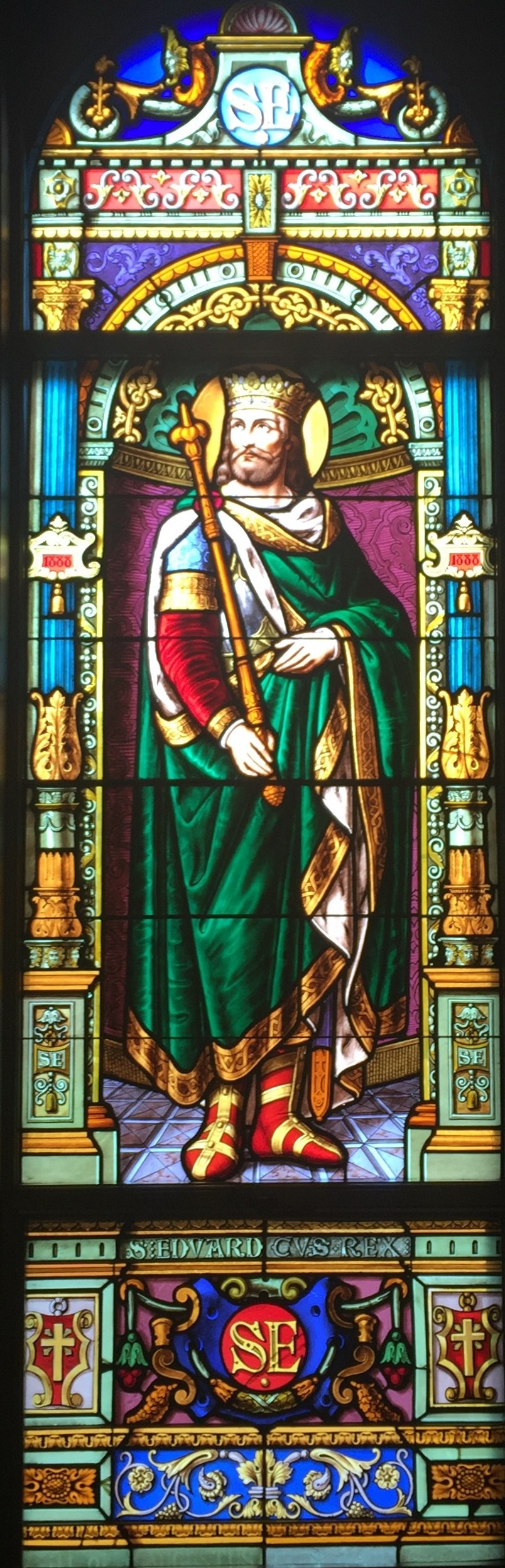
St Edward

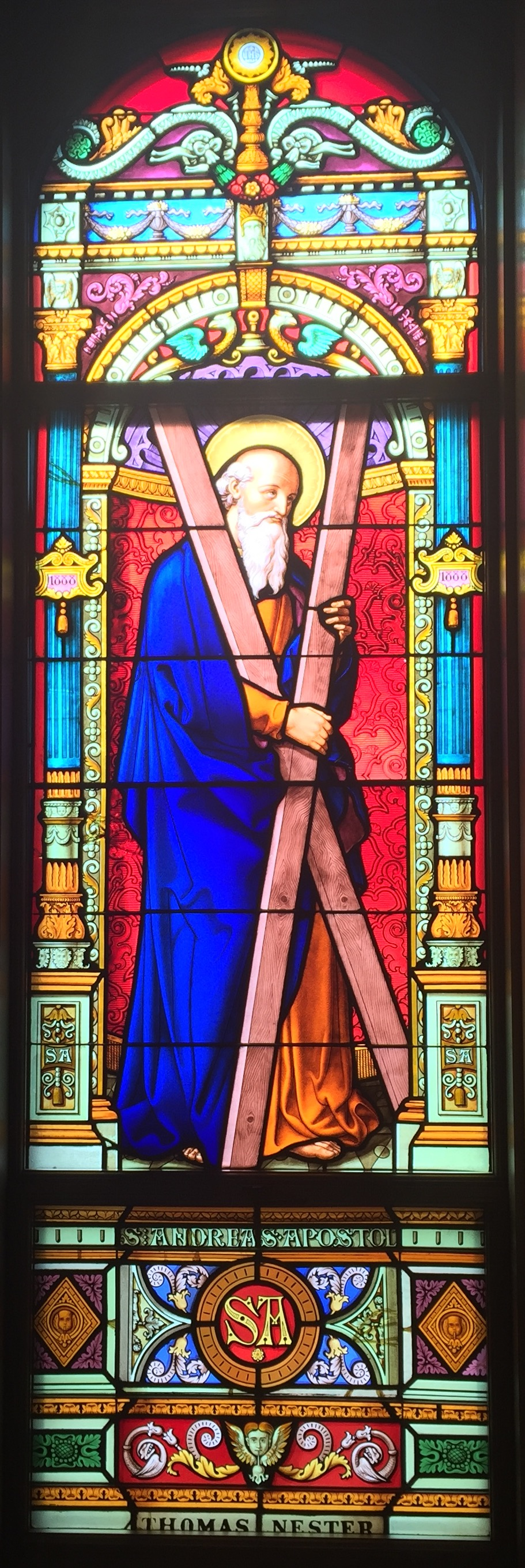
St Andrew

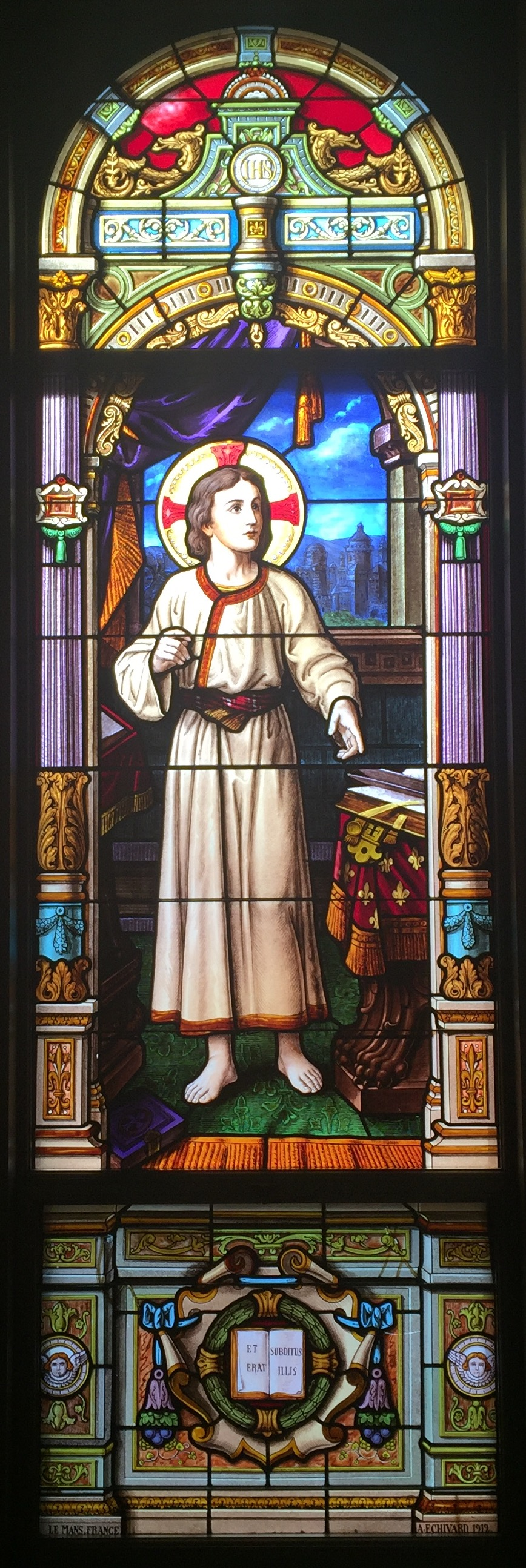
Young Christ

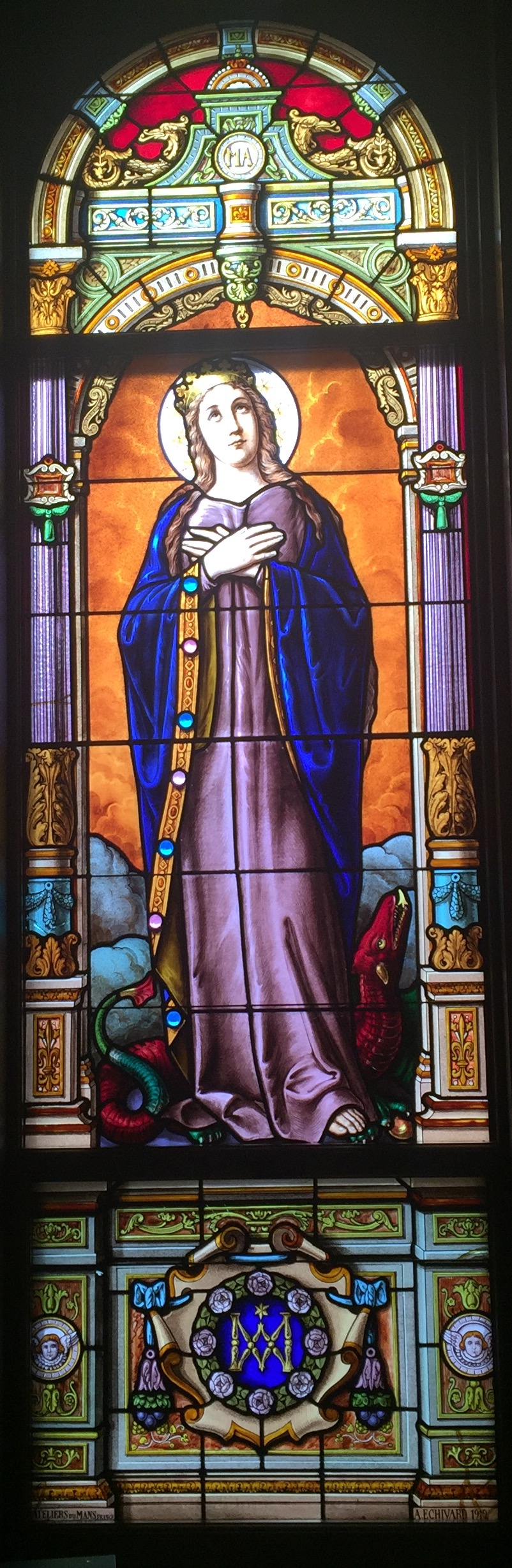
Mary

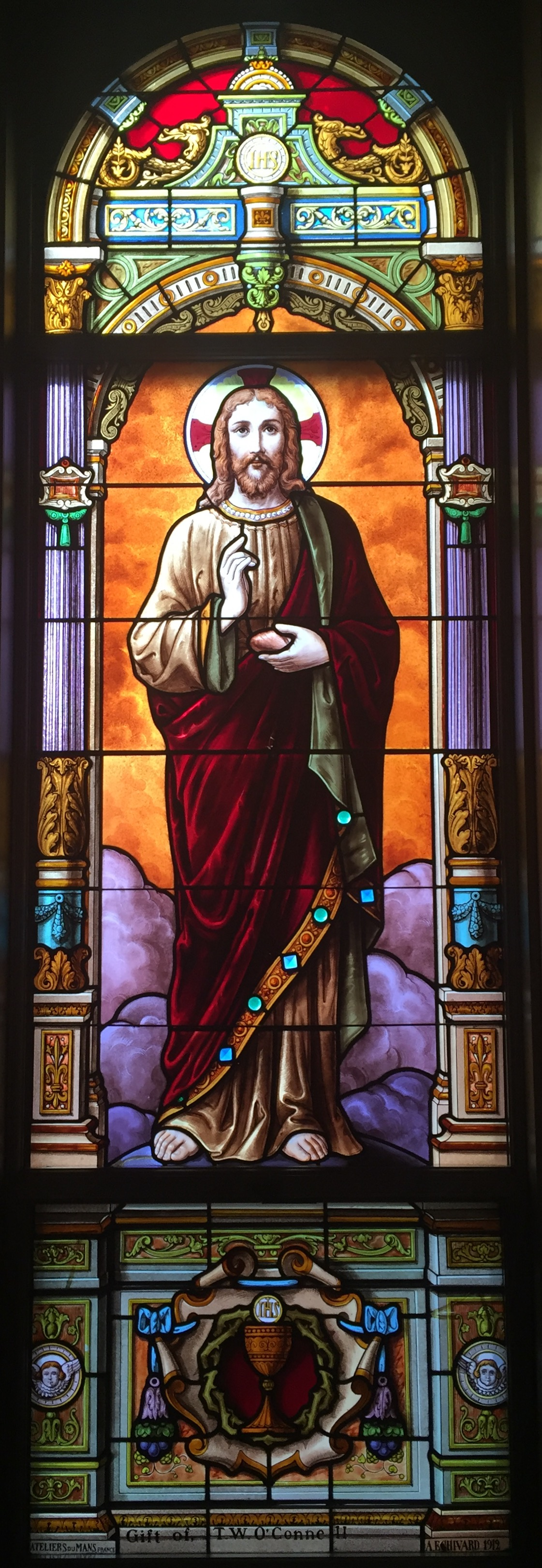
Jesus

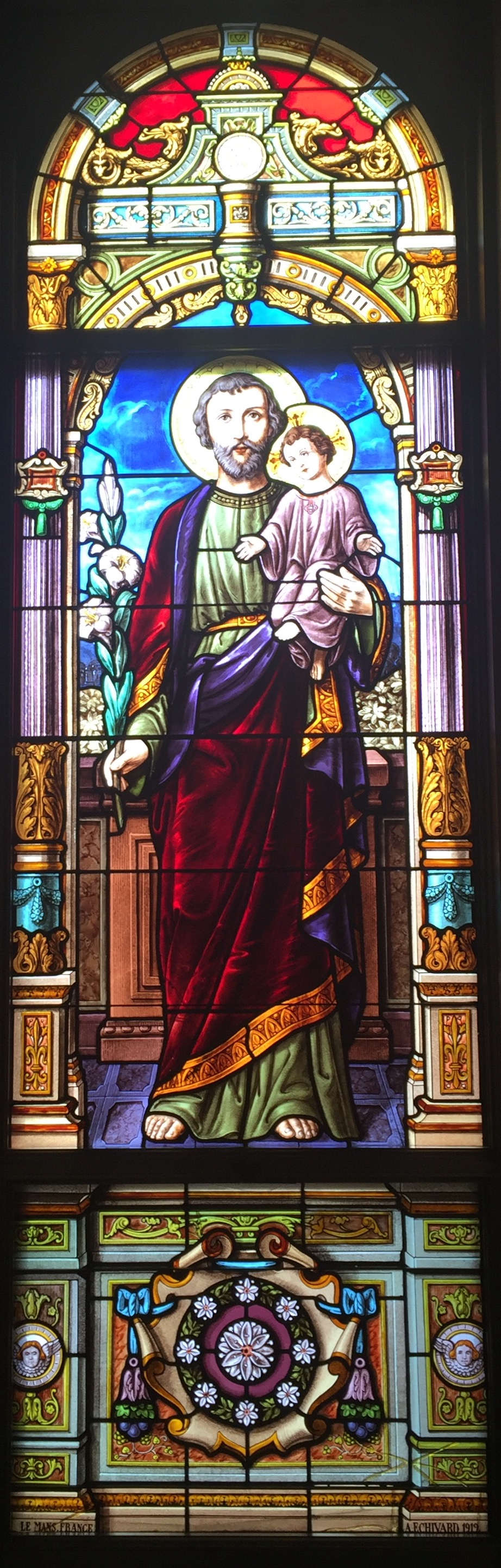
St Joseph

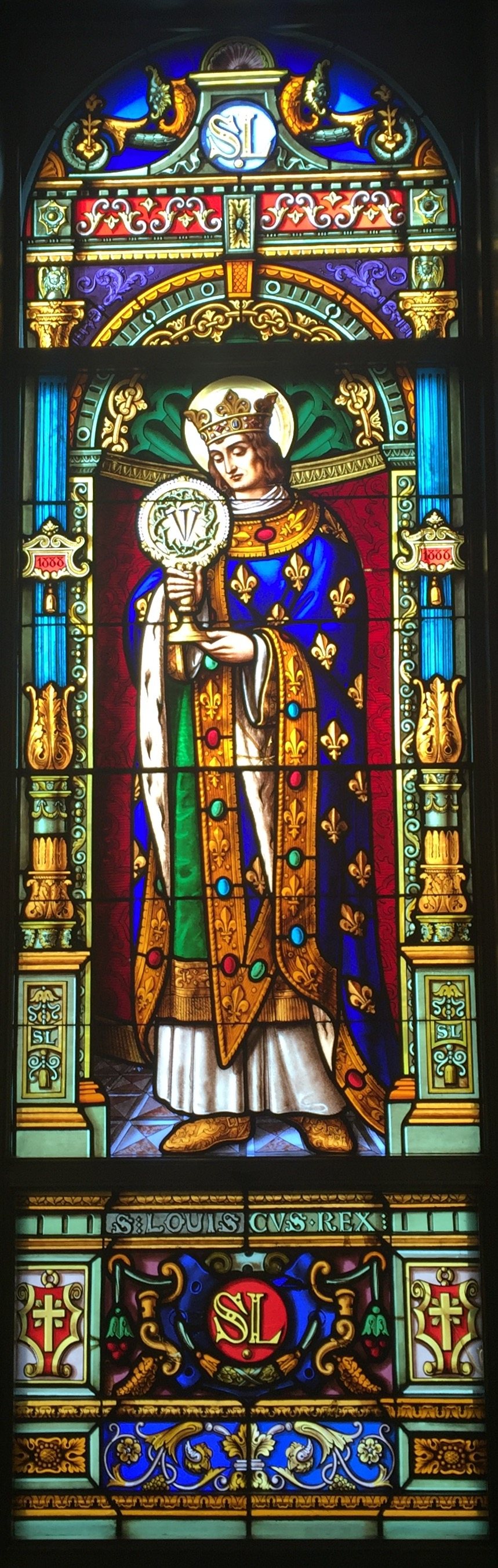
St Louis

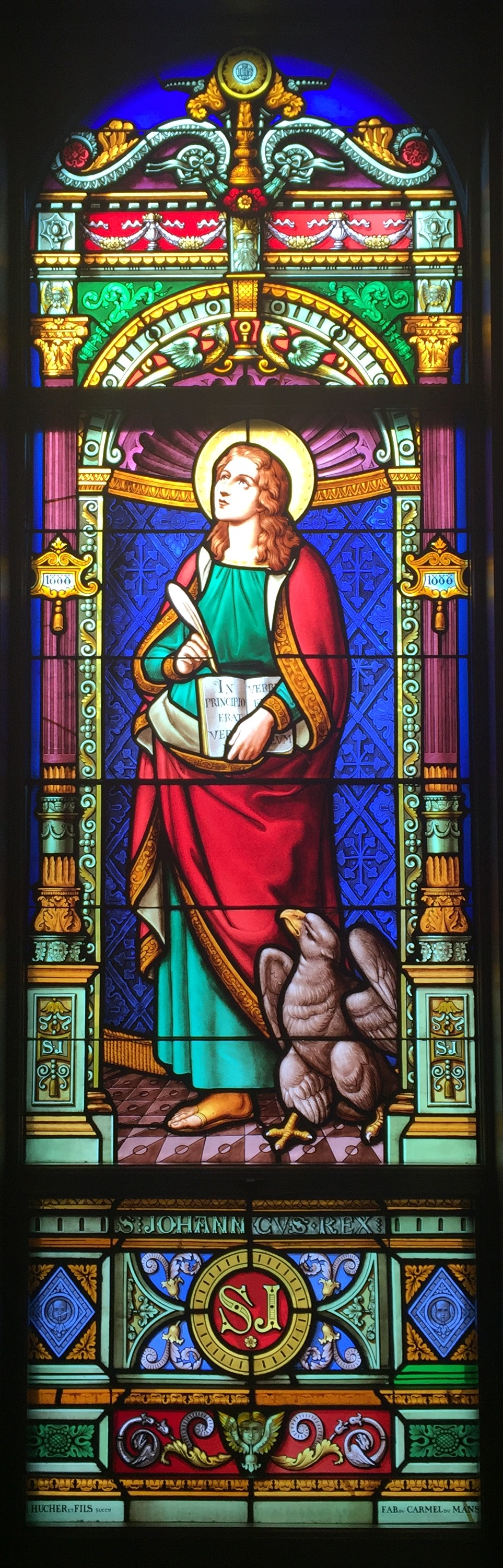
St John

== Notable residents ==
- John Carlson - Arizona Cardinals tight end
- Jimmy Clausen - Notre Dame football quarterback
- Pat Connaughton - Milwaukee Bucks shooting guard
- Phil Donahue - talk show host
- Joseph L. Falvey Jr. - federal judge U.S. Court of Appeals for Veterans Claims
- Ryan Grant - Green Bay Packers running back
- Tim Grunhard - Kansas City Chiefs center
- Dan Hesse - CEO of Sprint
- Paul Hornung - Heisman Trophy winner
- Sadoluwa "Dolu" Lanlehin - Nigerian prince
- Chris Thomas - professional basketball player
- Monty Williams - professional basketball player/coach

== See also ==
- National Register of Historic Places listings in St. Joseph County, Indiana
