= Keenan Hall =

Residence hall at the University of Notre Dame

- University of Notre Dame
- Coat of arms of Keenan Hall; Arms: Quarterly 1st and 4th a shamrock azure 2nd and 3rd azure four bends sinister argent
- Campus quad: North
- Coordinates: 41°42′14″N 86°14′15″W
- Motto: Fratres in Christo (Latin)
- Motto in English: Brothers in Christ
- Established: 1957
- Named for: James Keenan Jr.
- Architect: Ellerbe Becket
- Architectural style: Modern architecture, with elements of collegiate Gothic
- Colors: Navy and white
- Gender: Male
- Rector: Cory Hodson
- Benefactor: James Keenan
- Undergraduates: 184 (Fall 2026)
- Chapel: Holy Cross
- Mascot: Knights
- Sports: Baseball, basketball, bowling, cross country, dodgeball, football, golf, hockey, lacrosse, racquetball, soccer, table tennis, tennis, volleyball
- Charities: Dismas House, The Great Pumpkin, Habitat for Humanity, Slice of Life
- Major events: Keenan Revue, Muddy Sunday, Keenan Klassic, Disco Roll

Map
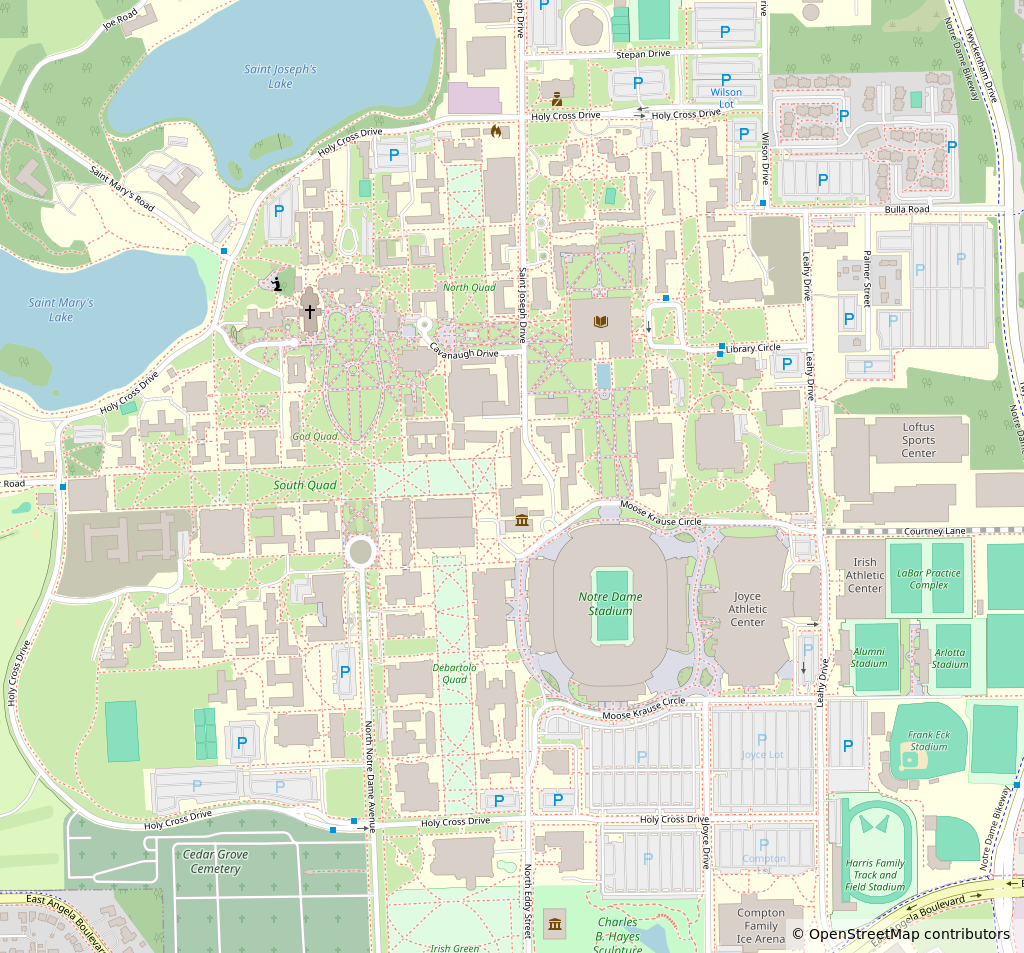
- Location within Notre Dame, Indiana

Keenan Hall is one of the 33 Residence Halls at University of Notre Dame. It is located on North Quad west of North Dining hall, between Zahm Hall and Stanford Hall. Keenan Hall shares the building and The Chapel of The Holy Cross with adjacent dorm Stanford.

It was built in 1957, funded by James Keenan, a hotel executive and Notre Dame alumnus, and dedicated to the memory of his late son James Keenan Jr. Its mascot is the Knight, and its colors are blue and white. It leads the Notre Dame halls by number of Hall of the Year titles won, and it hosts a number of the most popular events on campus, such as the Keenan Revue and Muddy Sunday, and is known for its interhall football tournament in the fall. Keenan Hall boasts a late night pizzeria known as Zaland, with a $1 slice.

In October 2026, the university announced that the residence hall, along with neighboring Stanford and Haggar Halls, would be demolished following the 2026–2027 school year. Two new dorm halls will be built in their place. Residents of Keenan Hall will live in Howard Hall until the completion of the replacement dorm in Fall 2029.

== History ==
The main entrance to Keenan on North Quad, with Stanford in the background

Keenan Hall was built in 1957 and was named after James Keenan, a Notre Dame alumnus from Fort Wayne, in memory of his son James Keenan Jr., who died in 1941 before entering the university. The Keenan family operated a chain of hotels in the Midwest, and Mr. Keenan served on Notre Dame's Lay board of Trustees. Its cost was $1,000,000. Keenan Hall was designed by Ellerbe Becket and built by the M. J. McGough Company. Keenan was part of a 4 million dollar expansion which included Stanford Hall and the North Dining Hall. The hall was dedicated on November 23, 1957, by bishop Loras Thomas Lane of Rockford, Illinois and president Rev. Theodore Hesburgh. It was followed by a luncheon for the Keenan residents sponsored by Hesburgh. Originally, it accommodated 300 students in 150 rooms. The inaugural rector was Rev. Michael Murphy, C.S.C. Keenan and Stanford were built as part of Rev. Hesburgh's vision of hosting all undergraduate students on campus housing. Initially, they accommodated freshmen. When it opened, it also had rooms for the priest-rector and four prefects.

Keenan and Stanford are hosted in two wings of the same building, built on the spot that once hosted the toboggan of the university's minims program. They are connected by a lobby and the chapel of the Holy Cross which they share. Keenan Hall is four stories high. The building is representative of functionalist architecture with a simple double-L shape plan, a flat roof, and little exterior ornamentation. Until the mid-1960s, it was a hall for incoming freshmen. It was designed by Ellerbe Becket and built by the M.J. McGough Company. The entrance doors are split in between the two dorms, and traditionally, Keenan residents do not use the Stanford doors and vice versa. The corridors of Keenan are blue and white, reflecting the dorm colors. Each floor is divided into two sections, North and West.

The Holy Cross chapel features a 13-foot crucifix and a wooden carving depicting "Christ as a Young Boy in the Temple" by Croatian artist Ivan Meštrović, at the time professor and artist in residence at Notre Dame. The chapel also features stained glass windows by Robert Leader, one of the last remaining Iwo Jima veterans who witnessed the famous flag-raising who died in 2006.

Robert F. Griffin, C.S.C was rector of Keenan Hall starting in 1969, and he was a well-known campus figure, known for his cocker spaniel Darby O'Gill, his Urchin Masses, and his radio show. He described his time as Keenan rector and life in Keenan Hall in his memoir, In the kingdom of the lonely God. In the 1980s, Keenan residents launched "Keenan Community Services", a program that focused on improving neighborhoods in disrepair in South Bend by renovating local homes, with about 50 of the 300 residents contributing to the renovation, upkeep, and maintenance of local homes. Brother Bonaventure Scully, CFX, was rector from 1986 to 1999, and instrumental in Keenan's commitment to Dismas House, a local non-profit dedicated to helping ex-convicts, where he volunteered often and was known for his cooking skills. In 2011 the Hall was awarded the T. Brooks Brademas Lifetime Achievement Award for their work at Dismas House. Keenan residents have been the longest serving volunteers at Dismas house.

The basement, known as the Keenan Kommons, is one of the largest common spaces on campus. It has lounges, ping pong tables, pool tables, televisions, and study spaces. The Kommons also includes a weight room, two kitchens, a laundry room, a music rehearsal space, a library/study room, and a meeting room. There is also a student-run pizzeria, called Zaland, that sells a select amount of pizzas, beverages, and ice cream. Zaland is the only student-run kitchen open seven nights a week.

Keenan has won Hall of the Year, Men's Hall of the Year, and Golden Hall of the Year several times. Its most recent award was Golden Hall of the Year for the 2023–2024 academic year.

== Traditions ==
=== Keenan Revue ===
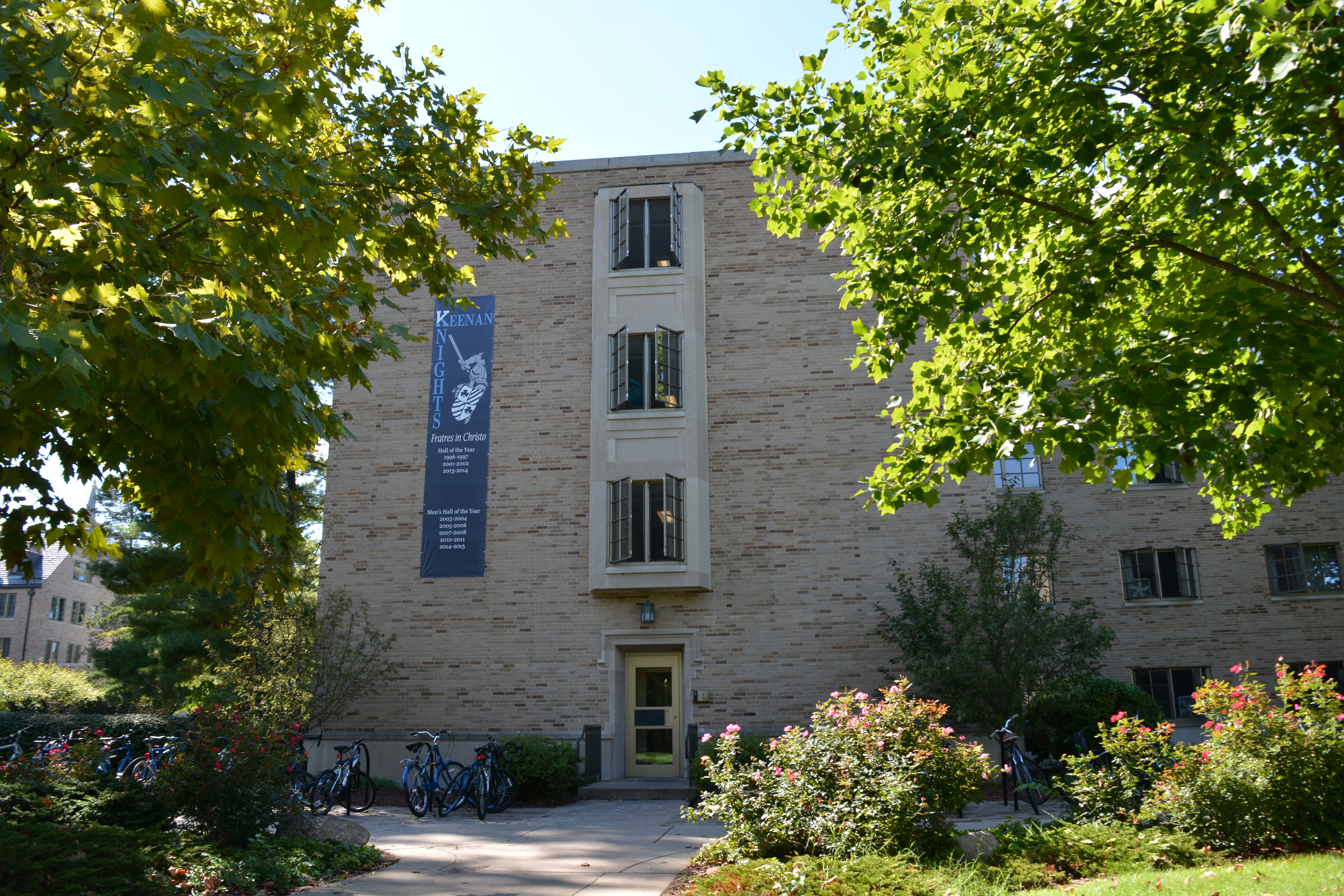
The east entrance to Keenan Hall, also located on North Quad

Keenan Hall hosts many activities and events, the most prominent of which is the Keenan Revue, a comedy sketch attended annually by more than 4600 students, making it Notre Dame's most popular hall event. The first Revue was organized in 1976 by two Keenan Hall RAs, Thomas Lenz and Richard Thomas. The event was created as an alternative pastime to the campus drinking culture, and was meant to showcase the performance talent of Keenan residents. Lenz was a member of the Glee Club and Thomas had previous experience in theater. The first show, called "New Keenan Revue", opened on November 6 in Washington Hall. The first Revue was a variety show, with performances including singing, comedy, violin, poetry, juggling and others. Over time, the Revue evolved mostly into a skit-based comedy show with musical talent included as well.

In 1979, issues with the electric wiring of Washington, together with the small size of the building, prompted the 1980 show to move to the O'Laughlin Auditorium at Saint Mary's College. The Revue broke even in terms of finances for the first time in 1983, and in 1984 it was taped for the first time. Because the residents wanted to keep the show free of charge as a gift for the community, the Revue was subsidized by Hall Presidents' Council in 1986.

The comedy of the Revue was often based on Notre Dame inside jokes and stereotypes. This led to a long contention with St. Mary's College, which hosted the show, but was also the frequent target of jokes. St. Mary's students started expressing their discontent with the show in 1991, and in 1996 Keenan invited St. Mary's representatives to preview the show's dress rehearsal. Nonetheless, controversy persisted, and many took aim at the Revue for the content of its jokes, sometimes deemed offensive. In 2000 the St. Mary's Board of Governance voted to allow the Revue to remain on campus, but controversy did not cease and in 2004 the editorial board of the student paper The Observer wrote a column to invite students to take the issue less seriously. The show was hosted in the O'Laughlin Auditorium at Saint Mary's College for the last time in 2010, when St. Mary's administration decided to cut ties. Since 2011, it moved to Stepan Center on the campus of Notre Dame.

In recent years, the skits of the show have parodied and made fun mostly of campus life and stereotypes, have been less harsh, and have caused less controversy. The show is the signature event of Keenan Hall and displays the talents of the dorm's residents. Three shows are offered on consecutive Thursday, Friday, and Saturday in February. The show is loved by the student body, and ticket distribution is an event in itself, always drawing large crowds, with tickets running out in minutes. With an attendance of over 4600 (1500 per show), it is the most attended hall event at Notre Dame.

For the 2021 edition, the Revue was performed in the Notre Dame stadium. It returned to the Stepan Center in 2022, where it has remained since.

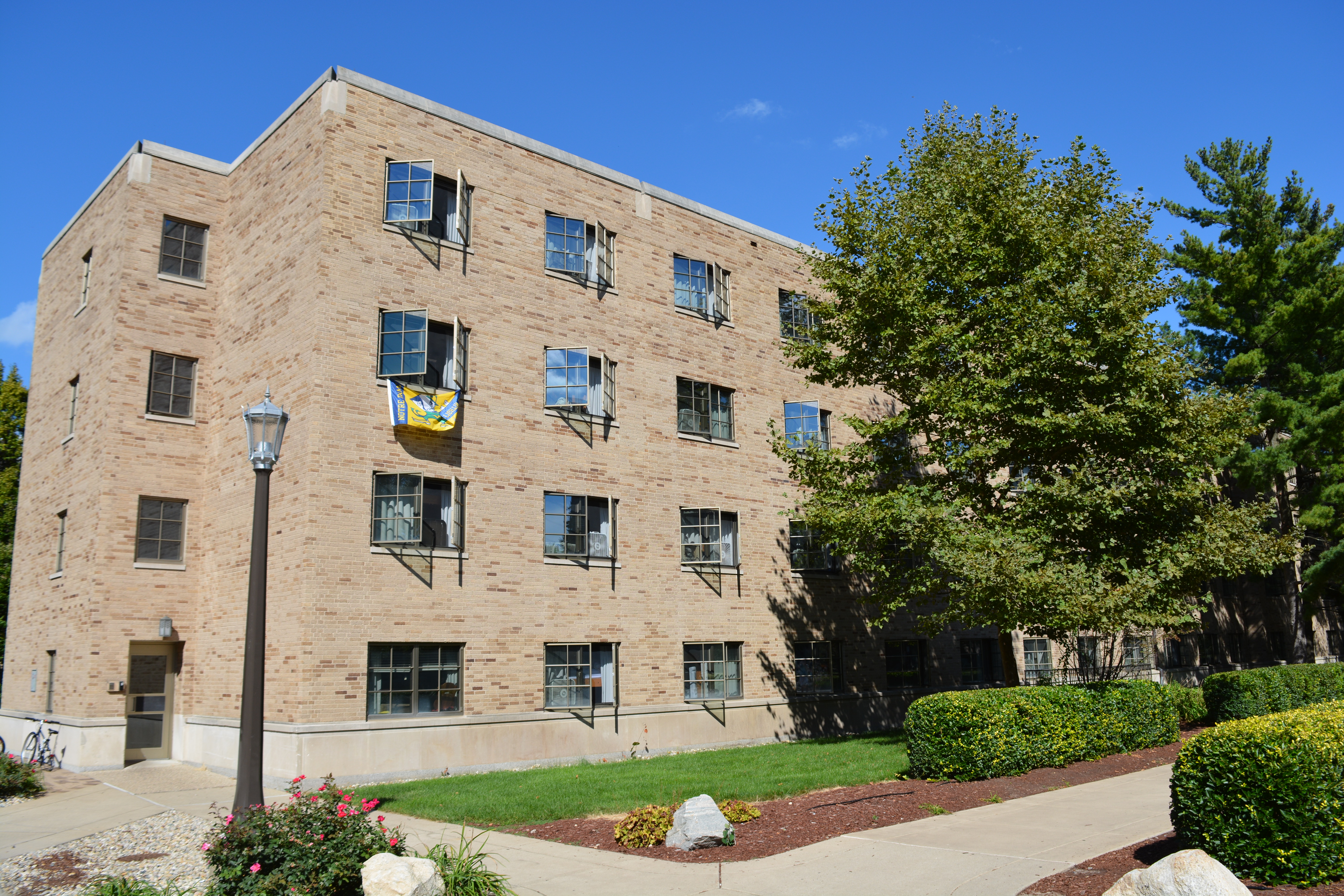
The south entrance to Keenan Hall, directly across from Zahm Hall, one of its rivals

=== Rivalries with Stanford and Zahm ===
Traditionally, the rival dorm of Keenan has always been the twin dorm Stanford Hall, with whom Keenan shares its chapel. The annual inter-hall football match is called "Battle for the Chapel". Along with the annual welcome week Tug of War. Keenan is very active in sports, especially in interhall leagues. In former times the main rival of Keenan was Zahm Hall. Residents of Keenan and Zahm have a long history of pranks and feuds, but due to Zahm Hall being discontinued, the rivalry no longer exists and the main rivalry remains with Stanford Hall.

=== Other traditions ===
Another event on campus is Muddy Sunday, a volleyball tournament played in mud during the annual spring An Tóstal celebrations. All the profits go to Habitat for Humanity. Keenan Hall's "SYR" is Disco Roll, a 70's-themed disco dance held at a local roller skate rink. Keenan also takes part in two service events each year as well as a weekly trip to South Bend's Dismas House, a safe haven for people recently released from incarceration, every Monday evening for dinner. Keenan residents have volunteered at Dismas House for over 35 years, and in 2011 the Hall was awarded the T. Brooks Brademas Lifetime Achievement Award for their contributions. The two major service events are the Great Pumpkin, a haunted house set up in the Kommons for underprivileged children in South Bend for Halloween, and Day of Service, which takes place in late March. Keenan also runs Keenan Klassic, a two-on-two charity basketball tournament the weekend of Reading Days in May.

== Awards ==
Golden Hall of the Year:

- 2023–2024

Hall of the Year:

- 1996–1997
- 2001–2002
- 2013–2014
- 2023–2024

Men's Hall of the Year:

- 2003–2004
- 2005–2006
- 2007–2008
- 2010–2011
- 2014–2015

== List of rectors ==
- Rev. Michael Murphy, C.S.C. (1957/58 - 1958/59)
- Rev. Joseph Hoffman, C.S.C.(1958/59 - 1960/61)
- Rev. Daniel O 'Neil, C.S.C. (1961/62 - 1963/64)
- Rev. Chester Prusynski**, C.S.C. (1964 spring)
- Rev. Michael Heppen, C.S.C. (1964/65)
- Rev. James McGrath, C.S.C. (1965/66 - 1967/68)
- Rev. Maurice Amen, C.S.C. (1968/69)
- Rev. Robert Griffin, C.S.C. (1969/70 - 1973/74)
- Rev. Richard Conyers, C.S.C. (1974/75 - 1981/82)
- Rev. David Garrick C.S.C. (1982/83 - 1984/85)
- Br. Bonaventure Scully, C.F.X. (1985/86 - 1998/99)
- Rev. Gary Chamberland, C.S.C. (1999/00 - 2001/02)
- Rev. Mark Thesing, C.S.C. (2002/03 - 2007/08)
- Rev. Dan Nolan, C.S.V. (2008/09 - 2011/12)
- Noel Terranova (2012/13 - 2016/17)
- James Tull (2017/18 - 2020/21)
- Bobby Nichols (2021/22 - 2022/23)
- Cory Hodson (2023/24 - 2025/26)
- Keenan Bross (2026/27 - Present)

**Interim rector

== Notable residents ==
- A.J. Pollock - Major League Baseball outfielder
- George Atkinson III '14 - former NFL running back
- Stan Bowman - Chicago Blackhawks Vice President and General Manager
- Joe Montana - 4-time Super Bowl champion quarterback for the San Francisco 49ers and Kansas City Chiefs
- Allen Pinkett - former running back for the Houston Oilers
- Golden Tate - Current NFL wide receiver for the Tennessee Titans
- Jamie Reidy '92 - Huffington Post author and screenwriter
- Matt Storin '64 - former editor of the Boston Globe
- Steve Bartman '99 - fan infamous for interfering in Game 6 of the 2003 NLCS
- Alize Mack - former Notre Dame Football tight end
- Cole Luke - former NFL cornerback
- Jeremiyah Love - Current NFL running back for the Arizona Cardinals
