= Abdulfatai Buhari =

Nigerian politician

Senator for Oyo North
- Incumbent
- Assumed office 9 June 2015
- Preceded by: Ayoola Agboola

Member of the House of Representatives of Nigeria from Oyo
- In office 3 June 2003 – 5 June 2007
- Constituency: Ogbomoso North/Ogbomoso South/Ori Ire

Personal details
- Party: All Progressives Congress
- Relations: Married with children
- Education: Ph.D
- Occupation: Politician
- Committees: Senate committee for ICT and cybercrime Senate committee on land and marine transport Senate committee on aviation
- Awards: Many including IICC Award

Abdulfatai Omotayo Buhari is a Nigerian politician born 1965 in Ogbomoso, Oyo State, Nigeria, who has served as senator representing Oyo North Senatorial district since 2015.

He pursued Business Administration at University of Ilorin, earning a Bachelor of Science degree in 1985. He then furthered his education to Ahmadu Bello University Zaria (ABU Zaria), where he graduated with a master's in business administration in 1993. In 2009, where he obtained a PhD in public policy from the University of Abuja.

He was first elected during the 2015 senatorial elections and re-elected in 2019 where he ran for re-election and won with over 18,338 votes, triumphing over his PDP counterpart with a total of 107,703 votes to his name and also in 2023.

In 2003, he served as a member of the House of Representatives representing Ogbomoso North, Ogbomoso South and Ori Ire Federal Constituencies. In November 2015, he was appointed vice chairman of the senate committee on industry. Subsequently, he was again appointed chairman senate committee on ICT & Cyber Crime. He has served as a commissioner for local government and chieftaincy matters of Oyo State.

He was also the chairman of the Nigeria Senate committee on land and marine transport in the 9th senate.

He was named the chairman, Senate committee on aviation of the 10th senate on 8 August 2023.

He also held the following positions:

- Chairman at Land Transport Committee from June 2019 to June 2023
- Vice chairman at ICT and Cybercrime Committee from June 2019 to June 2023
- Chairman at ICT & Cyber Crime Committee from June 2015 to June 2019
- Vice-chairman at Industry Committee from June 2015 to June 2019
- Senator at Senate from May 2015 to May 2019

Fatai Buhari has been described a Tinubu-like senator

He declared his intention to contest the governorship ticket of the All Progressives Congress (APC) in Oyo State on December 7, 2025.
