= Zahm Hall =

Student dormitory at the University of Notre Dame

- "Swing" Residence Hall
- University of Notre Dame
- Arms: Sable fretty gules
- Campus quad: North
- Coordinates: 41.7034°N 86.2373°W
- Motto: Venite et apparete aliquid
- Established: 1937
- Named for: Rev. John Augustine Zahm, C.S.C.
- Architect: Maginnis & Walsh
- Architectural style: Collegiate Gothic
- Gender: Swing (used for halls during renovation years)
- Chapel: Saint Albert the Great

Map
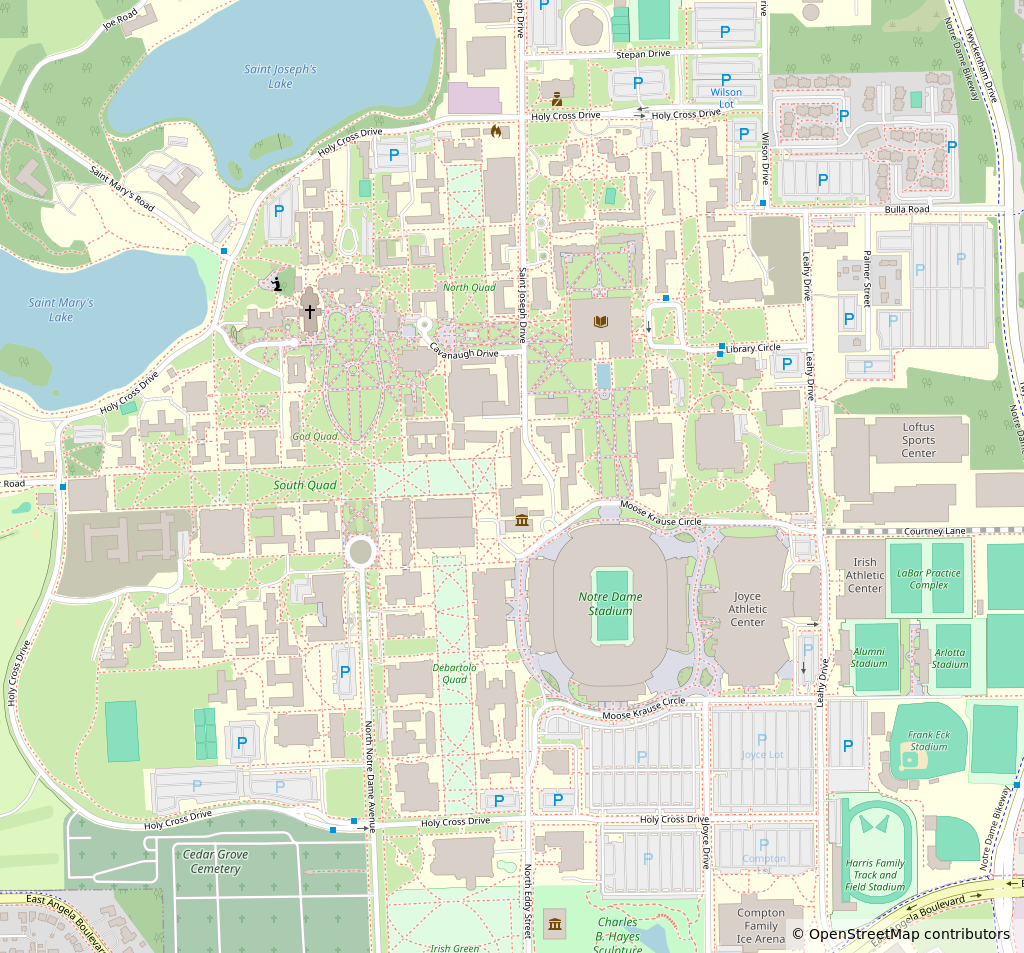
- Location within Notre Dame, Indiana

Zahm Hall, also known as Zahm House, is a University of Notre Dame residence hall. The building was constructed in 1937 and is located directly east of St. Edward's Hall and is directly west of North Quad. Starting with the 2021–2022 school year, Zahm Hall hosts communities of residents whose halls are being renovated, starting with Sorin Hall.

== History ==
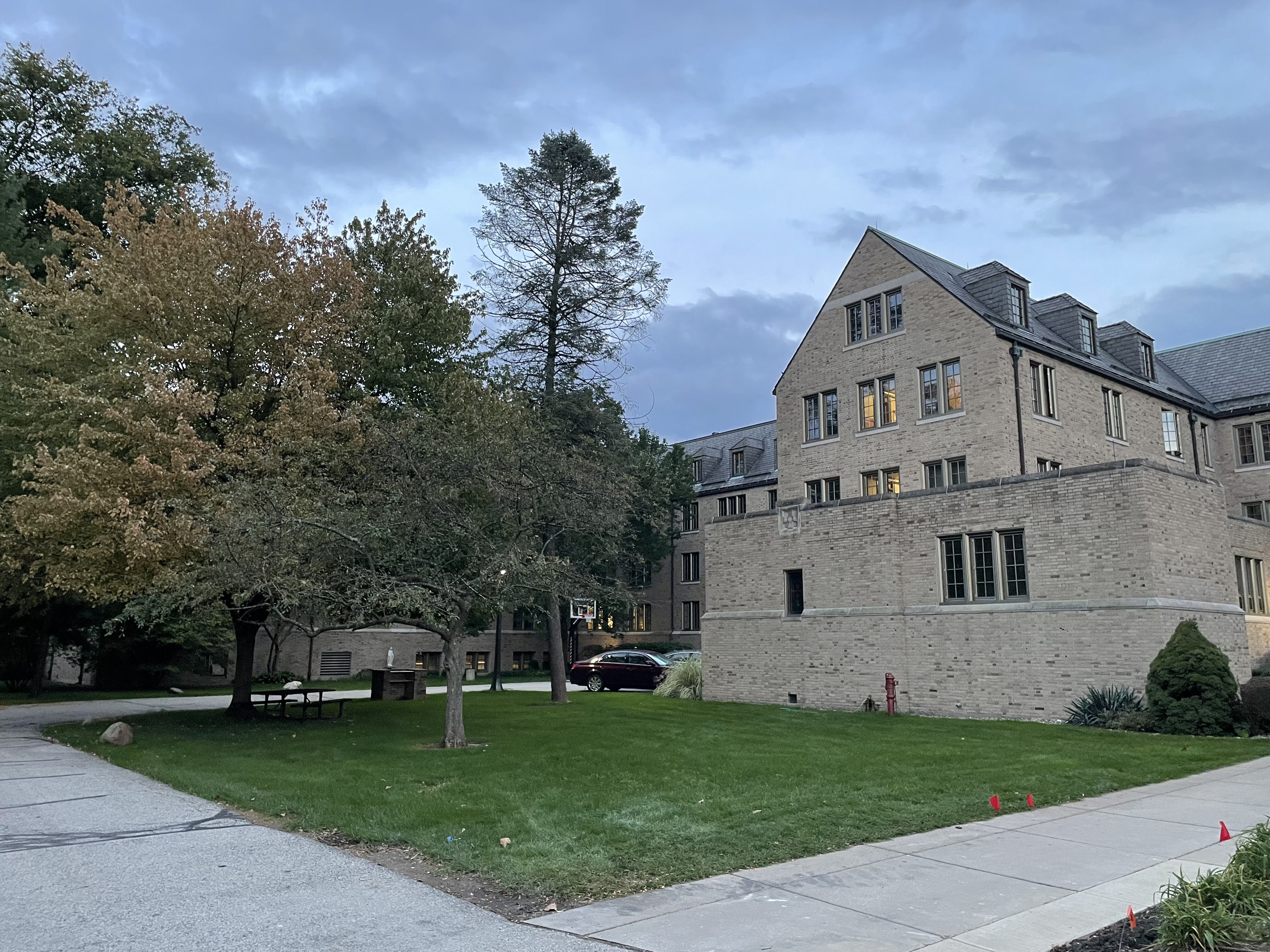
Zahm Hall

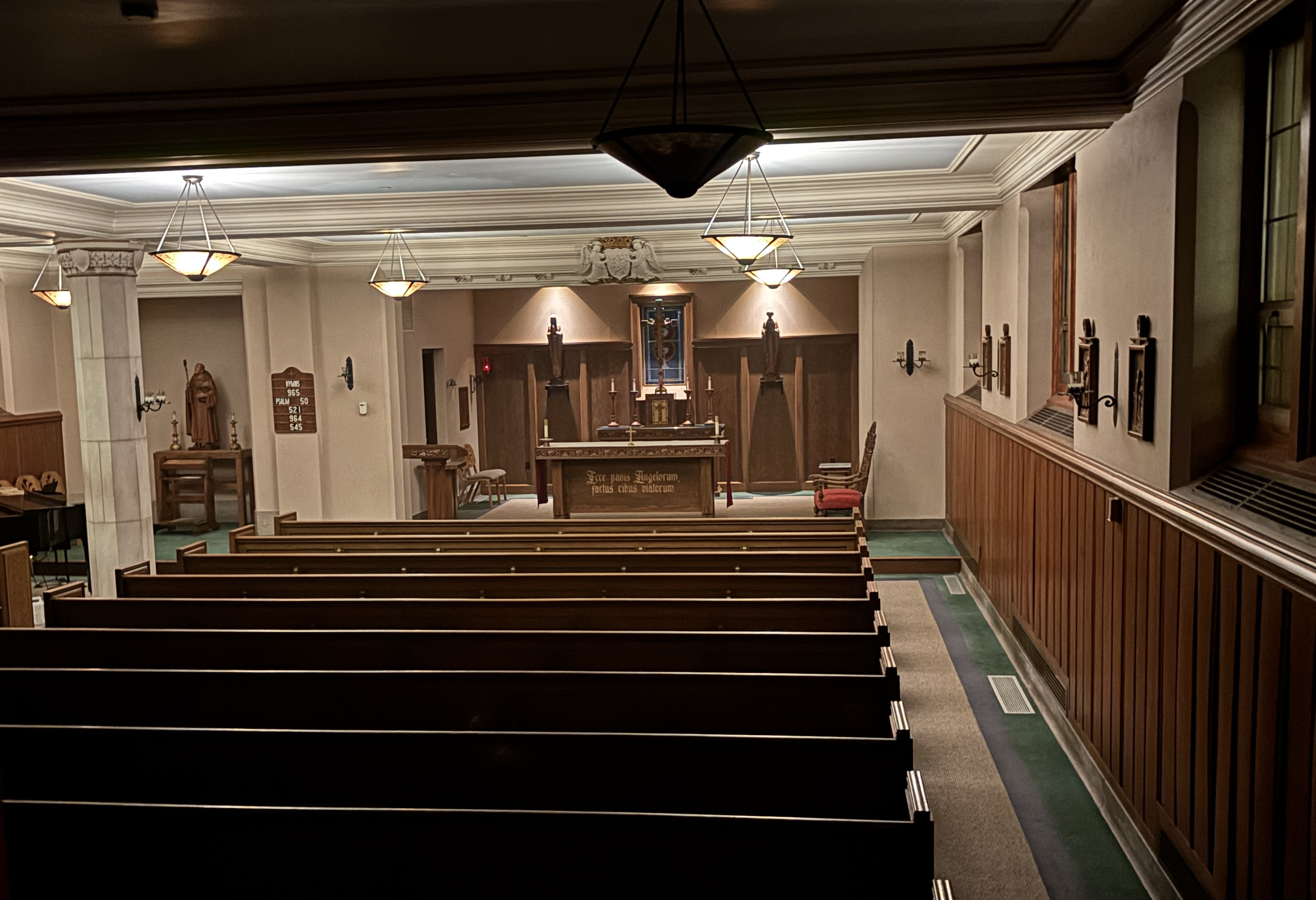
Chapel of St. Albert the Great in Zahm Hall

Construction began in the spring of 1937. The new dorm was built just east of Saint Edward's Hall on the site of the minim's extension (a structure that was added to Saint Edward's Hall) and the temporary dorm called Sophomore Hall (built in 1923), a wooden-framed structure that was demolished around 1935. Zahm was the third building constructed on North Quad – at the time called the “east campus.” The Boston architecture firm of Maginnis and Walsh designed it, together with Cavanaugh hall and the Biology hall (now Haggar Hall). The designs of Cavanaugh and Zahm Halls are nearly identical. They were erected despite the lack of funds during the Great Depression. The dorm, with its brick exterior, limestone stone, and slate roof, was finished in time for the opening of the school in September 1937 and housed 193 men. At its construction, it joined Brownson and Cavanaugh halls to host freshmen, while Carroll, Lyons, Morrissey, and Badin were for sophomores, Howard, Dillon, and Saint Edward's for Juniors, and Sorin, Walsh, and Alumni for seniors. Zahm Hall was dedicated to Rev. John Augustine Zahm, CSC. Zahm was a priest, naturalist and scientist at Notre Dame, and was the pioneer of the study of natural sciences at the university. The first rector of the hall was Reverend John A. Molter, C.S.C. Other rectors included Charles I. McCarragher (1945–1953), James L. Shilts (1960–1967) and, Thomas Blantz (1967–1970). The hall also housed Navy and Marines officers in training for the V-12 Navy program from 1943 to 1944.

Over the years, Zahm Hall garnered a reputation on campus, and has been the center of many contentions with the administration and other dorms. According to one legend, this stereotype comes from the early days of the university, when Zahm, at the time being the farthest hall from the academic and dining halls, was always picked last by students. Since picks were in order by GPA, Zahm often hosted the least accomplished students. In the 1960s, the university dropped academic requirements for first housing picks, and students were henceforth assigned randomly to residence halls before they arrived on campus their freshman year. One of the points of contention was the fraternity atmosphere fostered in the community, bolstered by hazing, streaking, vandalism, rowdiness, and the self-imposed moniker of "Zahm House". Fraternities and sororities are not allowed on campus, as they are described as in opposition to the university's educational and residential mission. In 2001, Zahm Hall residents were disciplined for purposely vomiting and throwing fruit at the window of rector of Keenan Hall.

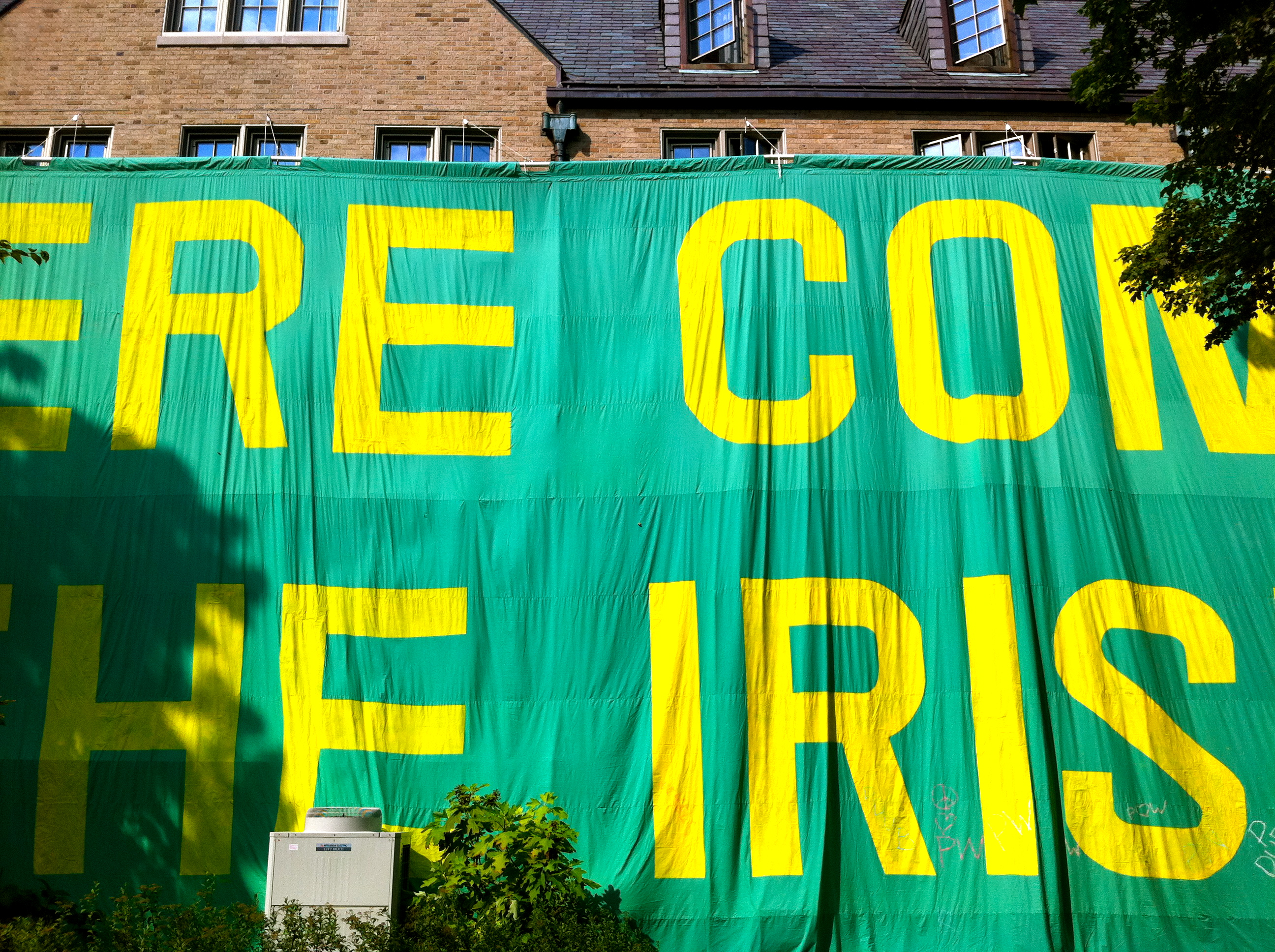
The "Here Come The Irish" gameday sign

Zahm Hall was best known for its practice of streaking during the Bun Run. The Zahm residents run naked across various campus locations, usually the weekend before final exams. This practice led to controversy and debate. Zahm also hosted their formal dance, known as "Zormal" in the fall semester and their SYR (Screw Your Roommate) dance, Decade Dance, in the spring semester. Zahm was known for its raucous reputation on campus. Its residents referred to it as Zahm House. Zahm Hall exhibited a large "Here Come The Irish" sign on the side of the building facing the North Quad during home football games. The mascot of the hall was Ignats, a stuffed moose's head acquired in 1979.

It was announced in March 2021 that Zahm Hall would shutdown and become a temporary home for Notre Dame students whose dorms are undergoing renovations. Zahm hosted the Sorin Hall community for the 2021–2022 school year as its first guests after newly becoming a swing dorm. The university cited vandalism inside and outside the dorm, a troubling culture and conduct of the dorm, deliberate lack of adherence to COVID-19 protocols (it was reported earlier that Zahm had twice the rate of cases than any other dorm), and disrespect for university officials, rector turnover, and "years of unsuccessful intervention to alter a troubling culture."

Reactions to the shutdown of Zahm Hall were mixed. Residents of the dorm protested the move by marching on South Quad and in front of the Main Building, arguing that the university's decision was unjust and saying that the dorm's negative reputation was undeserved. The Observer, a student newspaper, published claims by some students that the dorm's culture enabled an increased frequency of sexual assault. Those opposed to the university's decision contested this notion, citing the high rate of Green Dot Bystander Intervention certification of dorm residents, pointing out that there was no data to support the claim that sexual assaults happened more frequently in Zahm, and saying that the tight knit community ensured accountability. The Observer later reported that the number of sexual assaults that occurred in the dorm was "impossible to determine", citing a lack of public data. The Observer also reported that a series of mass emails distributed among Zahm residents featured references to heavy drinking, party culture, racial slurs, and jokes about sexual assault.

As a swing dorm, the men of Sorin Hall took up residence in the dorm during the 2021–2022 academic year, as did the men of Alumni Hall during the 2022–2023 academic year and the women of Breen-Phillips Hall during the 2023–2024 academic year. The men of Fisher Hall resided in Zahm Hall during the 2025–2026 academic year. Currently, Lyons Hall residents are housed in Zahm hall for the full 2026–2027 academic year while Lyons receives renovations.

== Gallery ==
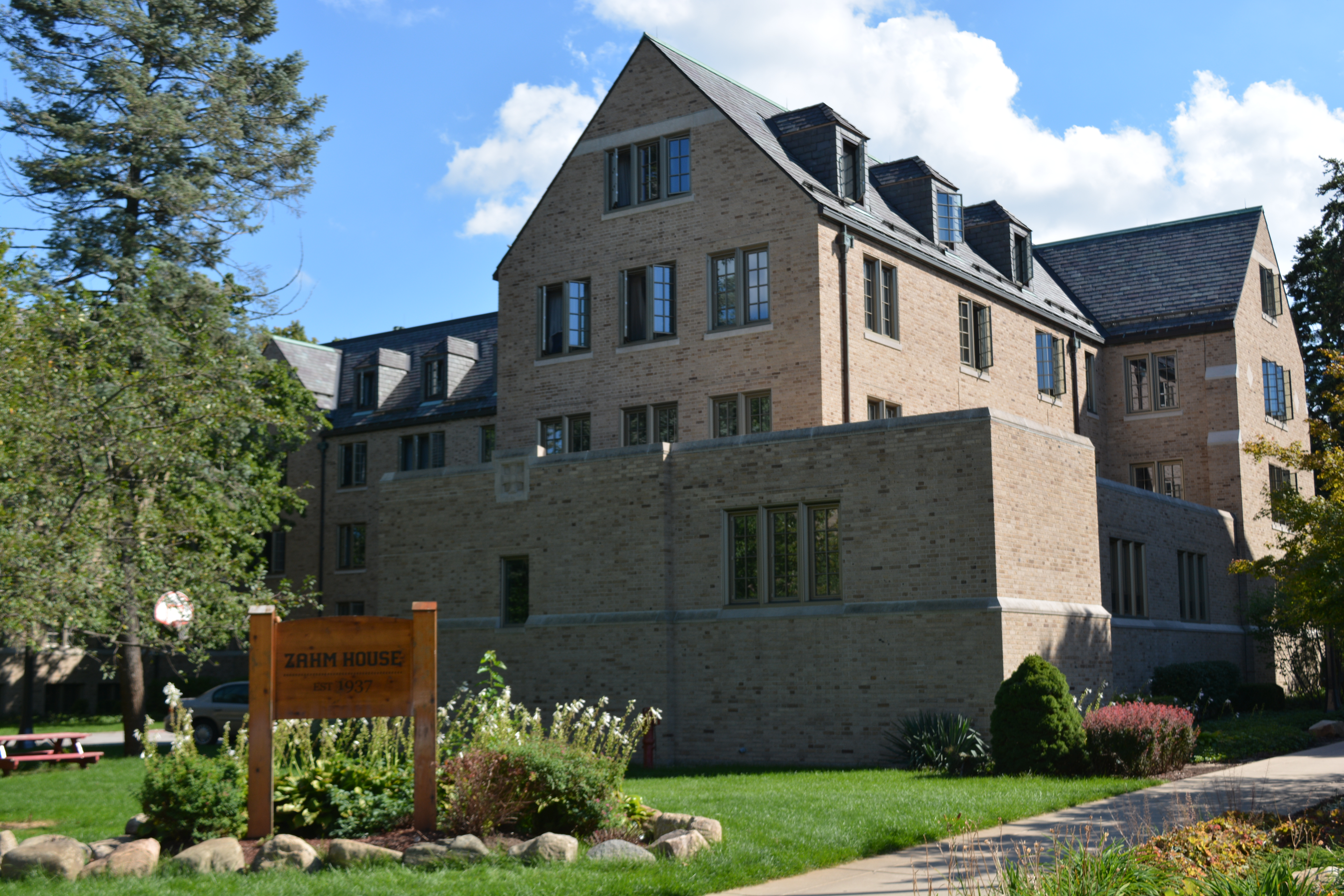
The rear of Zahm in 2016, displaying the "Zahm House" sign

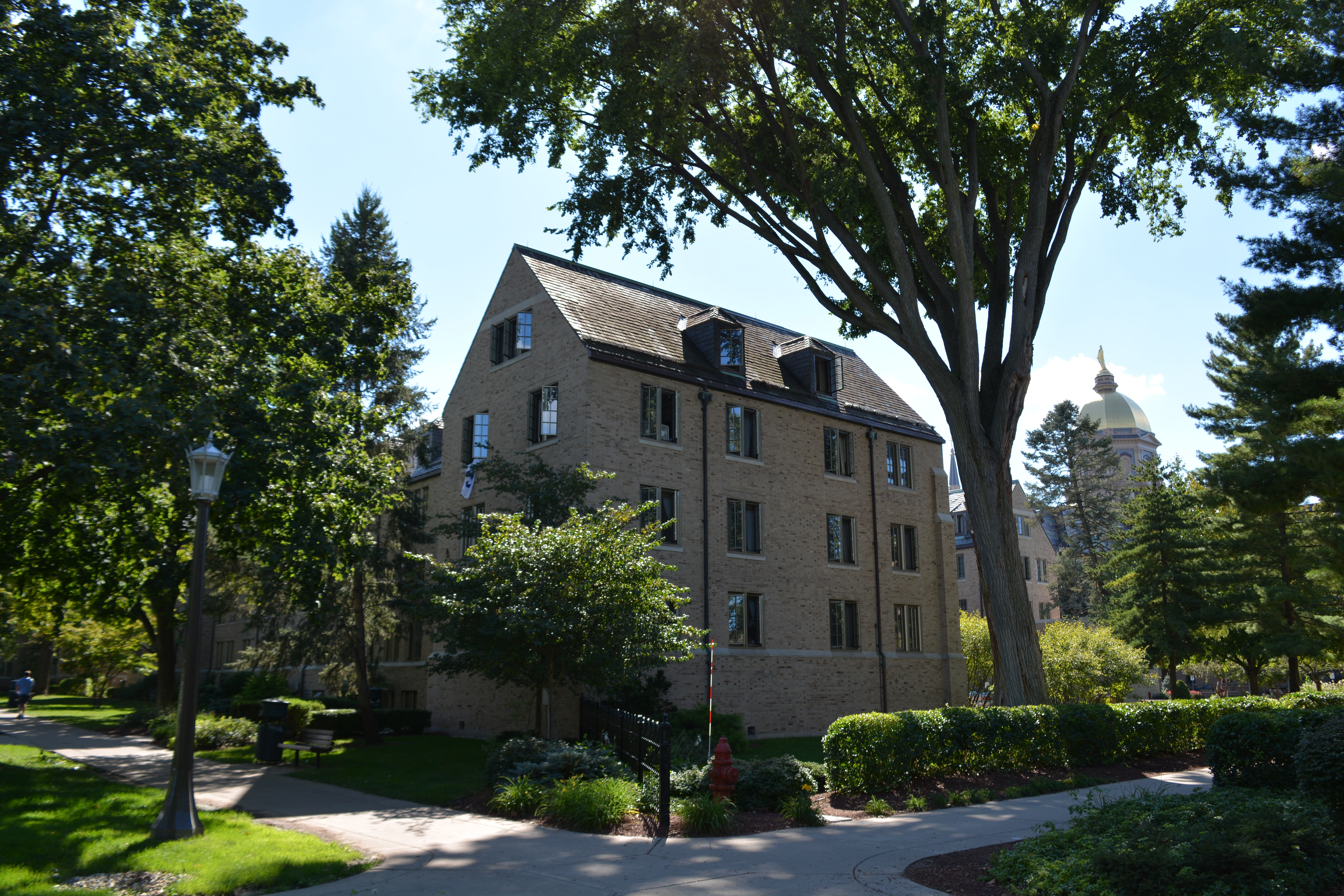
A side view of Zahm, taken from North Quad

== Notable residents ==
- Regis Philbin
- John Bellairs
- Barry Lopez
- Bill Laimbeer
- Phil Donahue
- Terry Hanratty
- Paul Hornung
- Johnny Lattner
- Joe Theismann
- Joe Montana
- Brady Quinn
- Anders Lee
