= Ayoade Ademola Adeseun =

Nigerian politician (born 1953)

Senator for Oyo Central
- In office 6 June 2011 – 6 June 2015
- Preceded by: Teslim Folarin
- Succeeded by: Monsurat Sunmonu

Personal details
- Born: 1 January 1953 (age 73)
- Party: Peoples Democratic Party All Progressives Congress
- Education: Polytechnic of Ibadan,
- Occupation: Politicians; Town Planner

Ayoade Ademola Adeseun (born 1 January 1953) is a Nigerian politician who Served as Senator representing Oyo Central, in Oyo State, Nigeria, in the 9 April 2011 national elections, running on the Action Congress of Nigeria (ACN) platform.

== Background ==
Ayo Adeseun completed his West African School Certificate examination in 1972 from Ogbomoso Grammar School, Ogbomoso, Oyo State. In 1976, he obtained a Diploma in Town Planning from The Polytechnic, Ibadan, Oyo State, and was an Assistant Town Planning Officer with Urban Development Consultants in Ibadan, oyo state from 1976 to 1977. Moving to California, United States, Adeseun worked as an Associate Planner, Southern California Association of Governments, Los Angeles from March 1980 until November 1982, and then as a Budget/Administrative Analyst with the same organization from November 1982 to April 1987. In 1986, he won a B.A in Political Science/Public Administration from California State Polytechnic University, Pomona, California, U.S. He then held a series of administrative positions associated with logistics at Santa Monica College (1987–1989), California State University (1989–1992) and Saddleback College (April 1992 - September 1994). Returning to Nigeria in 1994, Adeseun became a Principal Partner and Chief Executive Officer of Facilities and Environmental Management Associates, in Ibadan from 1994 to 1996.

== Political career ==
=== Local government ===
Adeseun was elected on a non-party basis as Executive Chairman of the Surulere Local Government, Iresaadu, Oyo State, holding office from March 1996 to January 1997, and was reelected to this position on a party basis, holding office until July 1998.

He was the founding State Chairman of the All People's Party (APP) in Oyo State (Sept 1998 - February 2000). From October 1999 to February 2003, he was Chairman of the Board of Directors, Oyo State Transport Company.

=== House of Representatives ===
In April 2003, Adeseun was elected a member of the Federal House of Representatives. He was appointed Chairman of the Appropriations Sub Committees on Power & Steel, and Science & Technology and was also a member of House Committees on Appropriations, Education, Judiciary, Information and Gas Resources.

Adeseun was reelected to the House of Representatives in April 2007 for the Ogo-Oluwa/Surulere Oluyole constituency, running on the People's Democratic Party (PDP) platform.

He was appointed Chairman of the South West Parliamentary Caucus, Chairman of the House Committee on Appropriations, and member of House Committees on Pension Matters, Rural Development, Sports and National Planning. Adeseun defected to the Action Congress of Nigeria (ACN) party in 2010. In the 9 April 2011, election for the Oyo Central Senate seat, Adeseun ran on the (ACN) platform, winning 105,975 votes, ahead of Luqman O. Ilaka of the Accord party with 92,544 votes and the People's Democratic Party (PDP) candidate with 78,643 votes.

In February 2011, Adeseun said the Federal government had only recorded about 40% of the capital budget being implemented, and this was only about 30% of the total national budget. He said lack of capital expenditure was not a good omen for Nigeria.

Senate President David Mark agreed, saying "No nation desirous of meaningful development can afford such a disproportionate allocation of its financial resources between consumption and investment".

Adeseun noted a wide discrepancy between claims of implementation rate between the legislature and the executive.

Speaking in March 2011, Adeseun said that the Appropriation Bill 2011 had been passed out of the national interest, citing intense pressure from the Executive, despite the initial refusal by the House since some agencies had failed to present their budgets.

=== Senate ===
Adeseun was elected to the Senate in 2011, assuming his seat on 29 May 2011. He is the Chairman of the Capital Markets Committee and a member of the Solid Minerals Committee.

In October 2012, as the Capital Markets chairman, Adeseun urged President Goodluck Jonathan to remove Arunma Oteh from her position as Director-General of the Security and Exchange Commission, calling his choice to reinstate her "a flagrant disregard of the resolution of the House of Representatives."

In February 2026, Adeseun, described in press coverage as an All Progressives Congress chieftain in Oyo State, explained that his advocacy for a federal polytechnic in Ayede, in Ogo-Oluwa Local Government Area, Oyo State, was driven by a Federal Ministry of Education study that found Oyo State had only one federal tertiary institution, the University of Ibadan, unlike other states with two or three. Adeseun said the project did not materialise during his first term in the National Assembly but that he continued pushing for it, and that his background in urban and regional planning informed his choice of Ayede as the site. He also welcomed a Federal Government policy allowing polytechnics to award degrees, calling it a reform that would remove the disparity between HND holders and university graduates and encourage more students to pursue technical education.
