= Olufemi Lanlehin =

Nigerian lawyer and politician

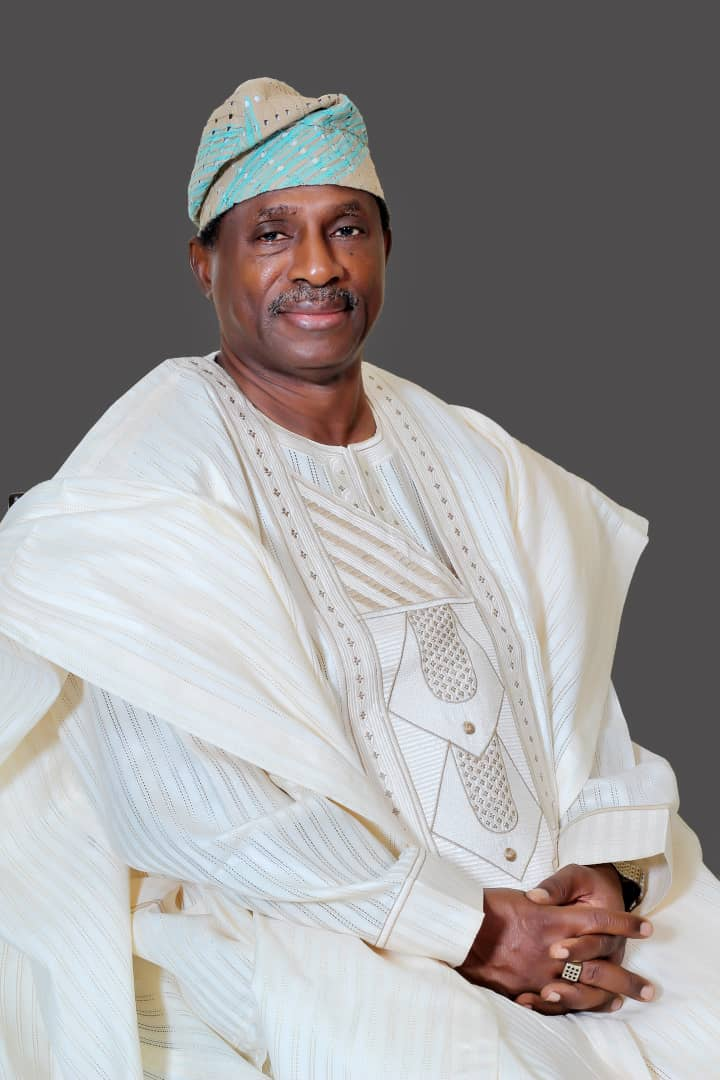

Senator for Oyo South
- In office May 2011 – June 2015
- Preceded by: Kamorudeen Adekunle Adedibu
- Succeeded by: Sen. Adesoji Akanbi

Personal details
- Born: 8 July 1953 (age 73) Ibadan, Oyo State
- Party: African Democratic Congress (ADC)
- Spouse: Adesola Olugbemisola
- Children: 4
- Education: University of Nigeria, Nsuka
- Occupation: Lawyer
- Profession: Legal Practitioner
- Website: http://senatorolufemilanlehin.org/main/

Solagbade Olufemi Lanlehin (also Known as SOLAN) is a Nigerian lawyer and politician. He represented the Oyo South Senatorial district in the 7th Senate of the Federal Republic of Nigeria. He contested for the seat of Governor of Oyo state in the 2019 Oyo State gubernatorial election under the African Democratic Congress.

== Early life and education ==
Olufemi Lanlehin was born into the Lanlehin family of Ibadan land. He had his secondary education at Ibadan Grammar School, Ibadan and Igbobi College, Yaba, Lagos.

Olufemi Lanlehin read law at the University of Nigeria, Nsukka, where he earned an LL.B. (Hons) degree, went on to the Nigerian Law School where he earned a BL and was called to the Nigerian Bar in July 1977.

== Career ==
Barrister Olufemi Lanlehin joined the law firm of the erudite lawyer and social critic, Chief Gani Fawehinmi SAN in July 1978, where he was until August 1980. In August 1980, he established his own law firm, Olufemi Lanlehin & Co and was appointed a Notary Public and Commissioner for Oaths in August 1980.

== Political career ==
in the 1992 Nigerian parliamentary election, he was elected to the House of Representatives representing Ikeja constituency on the platform of the SDP in the Third Nigerian Republic.

He was elected as the senator representing the Oyo south senatorial district in 2011 under the platform of the Action Congress of Nigeria.

In 2014, Senator Olufemi Lanlehin joined the Accord Party (AP) after the Action Congress of Nigeria (ACN) became defunct, following its merging with other political parties to form the All Progressive Congress (APC). In the 2015 General elections, SOLAN sought re-election as the Senator for the Oyo South Senatorial District under the Accord Party (AP), he lost to Senator Adesoji Akanbi of the All Progressive Congress.

Lanlehin was the gubernatorial candidate of the African Democratic Congress (ADC) for the 2019 Oyo State Gubernatorial elections. He lost to Peoples Democratic Party's (PDP) Oluwaseyi Makinde
