= List of flags of Ireland =

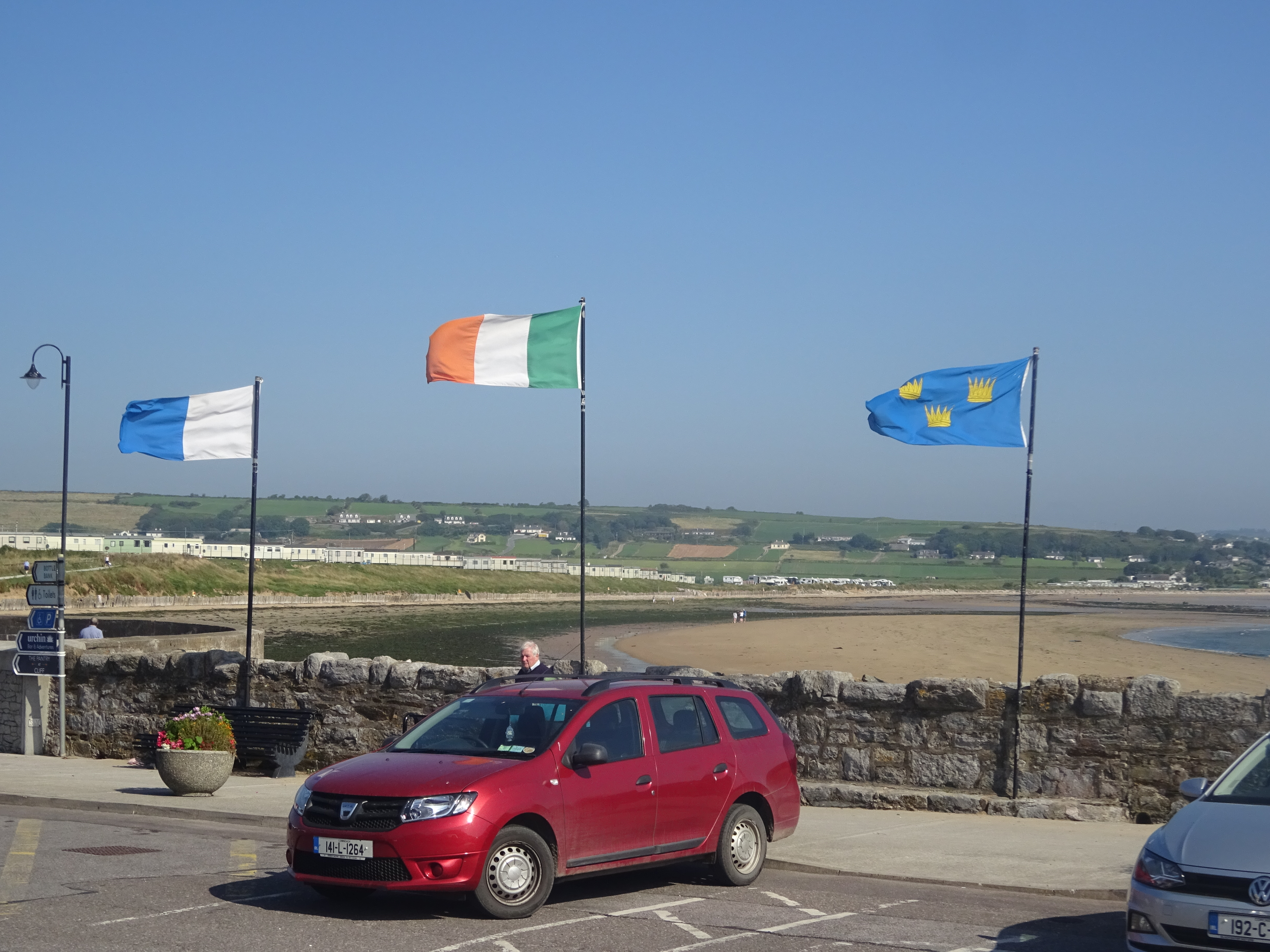
Three flags in Ardmore, County Waterford: the county colours of County Waterford, the Irish tricolour, and the Flag of Munster.

This is a list of flags which have been, or are still today, used in Ireland.

== Island of Ireland ==
The following flags have been used to represent the island of Ireland as a whole, either officially or unofficially.

Flag	Date	Use	Description
	1386–1542	The heraldic banner of the Lordship of Ireland. The earliest depiction of the 'triple crown' motif is found on the arms granted by Richard II to Robert de Vere (whom he created the first and only Duke of Ireland) as Lord of Ireland in 1386. "They were borne, apparently as the arms of Ireland, in the funeral procession of Henry IV in 1413. They appear as a device on the Irish coinage of Edward IV (1461–83), Richard III (1483–85), Henry VII (1485–1509), and the pretender, Lambert Simnel (1487). Edward IV specified them as the Irish arms in an indenture of 1483". The 'triple crown' motif has been traditionally associated with St. Edmund, the Saxon king of East Anglia (855–869) who is today one of the patron saints of England. The flag of East Anglia was a St. George's Cross with a blue coat of arms featuring three gold crowns – visually similar to the arms of the province of Munster. In his work 'Vicissitudes of Families', Bernard Burke, the Ulster King of Arms, proposed that St. Edmund's Banner was borne during the Norman Invasion of Ireland. A section of Christ Church Cathedral in Dublin is dedicated to St. Edmund, although his iconography is not displayed.	The banner of the Lordship of Ireland was based on the arms and feature three golden crowns ordered vertically on a blue background with a white border. It is blazoned: "Azure, three crowns in pale Or, bordure Argent."
	1542–1801	Standard of the Kingdom of Ireland. From 1801, it has been incorporated in the lower-left quadrant of the Royal Standard of the United Kingdom	A silver-stringed gold cláirseach harp on a blue field.
	1642–present	The green harp flag of the 17th century Confederacy of Ireland and an unofficial flag of Ireland during the 18th and 19th century. Variants have been used as the basis for numerous flags of Ireland. It was used by the Irish team at the 1930 British Empire Games.	A silver-stringed gold cláirseach harp on a green field.
	1783–present	The St. Patrick's Saltire, also known as the Cross of St Patrick, after Saint Patrick, the main patron saint of Ireland. "The Saltire became an established Irish symbol in 1783 with the founding of the Order of Saint Patrick by King George III to mark the legislative independence of the Kingdom of Ireland which lasted from 1783 to 1801. The Saltire is believed to derive from the arms of the FitzGeralds who were the Earls of Kildare and later Dukes of Leinster. Incidentally, Kildare County Council uses the Saltire on its coat of arms, as do Cork City and Trinity College Dublin, that both feature two flags – St. George's Cross and St. Patrick's Saltire. The flags of Queen's University Belfast and the Royal College of Surgeons in Ireland use the symbol and it can also be found on the badge of the Police Service of Northern Ireland (PSNI)". The flag has been used for almost 30 years by local authorities in Downpatrick for St. Patrick's Day. In addition, Church of Ireland flies this flag on special religious days throughout the island. While the saltire represents Ireland on the flag of the United Kingdom, this use is disputed by some Irish nationalists who have described the saltire as an "1800 English invention [..] for a people who had never used it".	The Saint Patrick's Saltire features a red saltire on a white field. In heraldry these arms are blazoned: "Argent, a saltire gules".
	1821–1922	Flag of the Lord Lieutenant of Ireland. It was granted in 1821 by the Lords Commissioners of the Admiralty under royal warrant, "to prevent the Inconvenience experienced for want of a flag distinguishing the presence of the Lord Lieutenant on board His Majesty's ships". The flag became defunct when the office was abolished by the Irish Free State (Consequential Provisions) Act 1922.	The flag of the United Kingdom defaced with the coat of arms of Ireland.
	???–present	The Four Provinces Flag of Ireland. This flag, and variants of it, have been used by various all-Ireland sports teams and cultural organisations.	The arms of the four provinces of Ireland are shown in quadrants. The order in which the arms appear varies.

== Northern Ireland ==
Flag	Date	Use	Description
	1922–1973	Personal flag of the governor of Northern Ireland.	A Union Jack defaced with the coat of arms of Northern Ireland.
	1924–1972	The Ulster Banner, also known as the Ulster flag or the Red Hand of Ulster flag, was the flag of the Government of Northern Ireland between 1924 and 1972. It was also adopted as an unofficial flag for Northern Ireland itself in 1953, in honour of the Coronation of Queen Elizabeth II. The flag was based on the arms that were granted to the Government of Northern Ireland in 1924 by the Ulster King of Arms based in Dublin Castle. The flag lost its official status in 1972 when the Parliament of Northern Ireland was abolished by the British government and since then there has been no 'official flag' for Northern Ireland. However, internationally, the flag is still used officially for sporting fixtures and events, such as the Commonwealth Games and by FIFA to represent the Northern Ireland national football team. Internally, the flag continues to be used by a number of local authorities and remains a divisive issue as it is mainly a symbol of Ulster loyalism.	The flag is a heraldic banner and features the Red Hand of Ulster, a six-pointed star for the six counties of Northern Ireland and the British Crown on a de Burgh Cross.
	1929–1973	Ensign of the former Northern Ireland government.	The blue ensign defaced with the letters GNI. Used on vessels of the Northern Ireland government.

== Republic of Ireland ==
Flag	Date	Use	Description
	1922–present	Flag of Ireland	A tricolour, with three equal vertical bands of green (hoist side), white, and orange; (the green symbolises Catholicism, the white peace and the orange Protestantism, therefore the flag represents peace between Catholics and Protestants). This is the flag and ensign of Ireland.
	1945–present	The standard of the president of Ireland was adopted in 1945, after the establishment of the Office of the President of Ireland (Uachtarán na hÉireann) in 1937. "This flag was approved by the Government on 13 February 1945. A number of technical decisions were made at the same time, including the decision that... the strings of the harp be yellow (in settlement of the question raised by Edward MacLysaght, who had insisted that the strings should be white)". The Presidential Standard was introduced prior to the inauguration of Ireland's second President Seán T. O'Kelly and therefore, it was raised at Áras an Uachtaráin in the presence of President Douglas Hyde on 24 May 1945, a month before the inauguration of his successor on 25 June 1945. The standard is flown over Áras an Uachtaráin and on vehicles used by the president. The flag is never flown at half mast and never takes precedence over the flag of Ireland.	The flag features a blue field and a gold harp with 14 silver strings.

=== Defence Forces flags ===
==== Naval Service ====
Flag	Date	Use	Description
	1947–present	The Irish Naval jack was adopted in 1947 after the establishment of the Naval Service (Ireland) (an tSeirbhís Chabhlaigh) in 1946. It is flown at the bow and used to represent Ireland along with the Naval ensign. The Naval jack is flown "by Irish Naval ships at the jack staff when at anchor, moored, alongside or when under way and dressed with masthead ensigns. It is hoisted and half masted at the same time and in like manner as the Naval ensign."	The naval jack of the Naval Service of Ireland features a green field with a gold harp with 14 diagonal golden strings.
	1996–present	Naval Service colour flag (obverse)	A navy blue field with the Defence Forces badge at the centre superimposed over a pair of crossed silver foul anchors. The colour is bordered by a two-inch wide gold fringe.
	1996–present	Naval Service colour flag (reverse)	A navy blue field containing the state harp at its centre surrounded by a naval knotted rope decoration.

==== Air Corps ====
Flag	Date	Use	Description
		Irish Air Corps flag	Composed of red and yellow diagonal strips on a blue field with the emblem of Irish Air Corps at its centre, the emblem of Irish Defence forces at the upper hoist and the Air Corps roundel at the lower fly.

==== Army ====
Flag	Date	Use	Description
		Irish Army flag	
	1966–present	The military colours of the 1st Brigade of the Irish Defence Forces were part of a set of six unit colours that were designed in 1964. It was originally known as the Southern Command until the reorganisation of the army in 2012. There are now only two brigades responsible for military operations in Ireland.	The military colours of the 1st Brigade are a field "divided per bend, or diagonally, yellow above and blue below, with a centrepiece of a stylised ship with a red hull and white sails encircled by a parti-coloured antique crown of yellow and blue. This device is a combination of details of the arms of the province of Munster and the city of Cork." 'Óglaigh na hÉireann' is written across the top, which is the official Irish title for the Defence Forces (Ireland). 'An Cead Briogaid' is written at across the bottom and means '1st Brigade' in Irish. The badge of the Irish Defence Forces is placed in the upper fly corner.
	1966–present	The military colours of the 2nd Brigade of the Irish Defence Forces were part of a set of six unit colours that were designed in 1964 and were the first to be completed. They "were carried for the first time in the army parades and marches which formed part of the Dublin celebrations of the fiftieth anniversary of the 1916 rising at Easter 1966".	The military colours of the 2nd Brigade are "divided per pale, or vertically, in two stripes, blue and green. The centrepiece shows a rising sun in yellow, on which are superimposed a flaming tower and a yellow harp device. The sun device is from the Irish Volunteer colours of 1914, the tower is from the arms of the city of Dublin and the harp is from the arms of the province of Leinster". Óglaigh na hÉireann is written across the top, which is the official Irish title for the Irish Defence Forces. 'An Dara Briogaid' is written at across the bottom and means '2nd Brigade' in Irish. The badge of the Irish Defence Forces is placed in the upper fly corner.
		Air Defence Regiment flag	Composed of an orange flag with a purple emblem of Air Defence Regiment at its centre.
		Defence Forces Infantry Corps flag	Purple banner with two crossed rifles at its centre with the word 'Coiste' (Infantry) underneath, this is the flag of the Infantry Corps.
		Defence Forces Ordnance Corps flag	A dark red flag containing the insignia of the Ordnance Corps at its centre.
		Defence Forces Cavalry Corps flag	A black flag containing the emblem of the Cavalry Corps at its centre.
		Defence Forces Engineer Corps flag	A yellow flag containing the emblem of the Engineer Corps at its centre.
		Defence Forces CIS Corps flag	A blue flag containing the emblem of the CIS Corps at its centre.
		Defence Forces Artillery Corps flag	An orange flag containing the emblem of the Artillery Corps at its centre.
		Defence Forces Medical Corps flag	A teal flag containing the emblem of the Medical Corps at its centre.

==== Defence Force Training Centre (DFTC) ====
Flag	Date	Use	Description
		The colours of the Defence Forces Training Centre represent the place "for all Defence Forces training, education and logistical units".	The colours of the Defence Forces Training Centre feature a navy field, the shield of the Defence Forces Training Centre in the middle, its name in Irish at the bottom: ‘Airmheán Traenála Óglaigh na hÉireann’ and the badge of the Irish Defence Forces in the upper fly corner. The shield depicts an oak leaf and two acorns. The training centre is located at the Curragh Camp in County Kildare. The name Kildare is the anglicised form of the Irish 'Cill Dara', which means 'church of the oak'.

=== Coast Guard ===
Flag	Date	Use	Description
		Coast Guard flag	A white flag containing the emblem of the Coast Guard at its center.

== Traditional province flags ==
Flag	Date	Use	Description
		Flag of Ulster	The arms of the nine-county province of Ulster form a composite achievement, combining the heraldic symbols of two of that province's best known families, namely the cross of de Burgh and the dexter hand of O Neill (Ua Néill, later Ó Néill) Kings of Ailech and Tír Eoghan.
		Flag of Munster	The province of Munster has been heraldically symbolised by three golden antique crowns on a blue shield. A crown of the type now known as antique Irish forms an integral element of a thirteenth-century crozier head found near Cormac's Chapel on the Rock of Cashel. In the case of the 'king-bishops' of Cashel, the placing of the antique crown on their crozier was a symbolic assertion of their right to the political sovereignty of Munster.
		Flag of Connacht	The arms of Connacht use a dimidiated (divided in half from top to bottom) eagle and armed hand. Ruaidhri O'Conchobhair, King of Connacht, is surmised to have been conceded the arms of Schottenklöster for the Irish monastery founded in Regensburg, which approximate to the Connacht flag of 1651.
		Flag of Leinster	A silver-stringed golden harp on a green background. Possibly the oldest and certainly the most celebrated instance of the use of the harp device on a green field was the flag of Owen Roe O'Neill. It is recorded that his ship, the St Francis, as she lay at anchor at Dunkirk, flew from her mast top 'the Irish harp in a green field, in a flag'.
	No history of flag use	The ancient Kingdom of Meath (Mide) was represented by the emblem of a king seated on a throne. There is no history of a flag ever being used, however an emblem was used which derived from iconography rather than classic heraldry. "The old province of Meath, which is nearly coextensive with the present day Diocese of Meath, is heraldically personified by a representation of a royal personage seated on a throne... It is, of course, fitting that Meath, wherein stood Tara, the symbolic site of the Kingship of Ireland, should be shown heraldically by a representation of a royal personage, or majesty, seated on a throne. The arms of Meath were apparently used at one time as the arms of Ireland, i.e. a majesty on a sable (black) background, the provincial arms being displayed on an azure (blue) field".	The flag of Mide features a light blue field with a king sitting on a throne. The sceptre and outstretched right hand symbolise sovereignty and justice respectively. Today this emblem is used by the Meath GAA team but not the Meath County Council.

== City and town flags ==
Flag	Date	Use	Description
	1885–present	The flag of Dublin City was adopted in 1885 by the Dublin Corporation. In the canton it features 'three burning castles' which are part of the coat of arms of the city that were officially granted in 1607 by the Ulster King of Arms, Daniel Molyneux. The arms was a corruption of the earlier seal of Dublin that featured one castle with three watchtowers on the obverse and a ship on the reverse, whose earliest mention was in 1230. The seal of Dublin was based on the arms of Bristol as King Henry II granted the city to his men of Bristol with the 1171 Charter. This meant that Bristol merchants took control of colonisation of the Dublin city after the Norman invasion of Ireland. The flag is flown over Dublin City Hall, the Mansion House and around the city, both indoors as well as outdoors. It acts as the de facto flag of the Dublin City Council.	The flag of Dublin City features a green field with a gold harp and three white two-towered burning castles on a navy canton. The gold harp represents both Ireland and Leinster, while the three burning castles are the lesser coat of arms of the city. Green and blue are the two national colours of Ireland.
	1890–present	Flag of Belfast is a heraldic banner that is based on the shield of the coat of arms of the city. The arms were granted in 1890, two years after Belfast was awarded city status by Queen Victoria. Although the banner was adopted in 1890, it has seldom been used. "The precise origins and meanings of the symbols contained on the Coat of Arms are unknown. But images such as the bell, the seahorse, the ship and the chained wolf were all used by 17th-century Belfast merchants on their signs and coinage. The seahorse, which is used twice, shows the maritime importance of Belfast, as does the ship at the base of the shield".	The flag of Belfast is a horizontal bicolour of white and light blue. It features a silver bell in a red canton, a triangle of vair (a type of heraldic pattern) and a ship on waves with a Saint Patrick's Saltire as a naval ensign and masthead.
	2012–present	The flag of Drogheda town was adopted by Drogheda Borough Council in 2012 and features a triband of red and black which are considered to be the 'town colours' and the coat of arms of Drogheda town. The exact origins of the arms are obscure due to the records being lost in a fire. Some believe that the 'castle and ship' element on the shield is derived from the arms of Bristol, in the same way as the 13th century Dublin seal. Others feel that the castle represents Saint Laurence Gate, while the ship stands for the river Boyne and Drogheda port. The 'star and crescent' emblem has the same origin as the coat of arms of Portsmouth and is taken from the arms of Richard I of England (Lionheart) who adopted it during the Third Crusade. The three lions 'passant guardant' are also derived from Richard I who began to use the emblem in 1198 to represent his position as King of the English, Duke of the Normans and Duke of the Aquitaines. These emblems honour the king, during whose reign Drogheda was granted its charter in 1194 by Hugh de Lacy. Since the 'Local Government Reform Act 2014' that came into effect from 1 June 2014, Drogheda Borough Council no longer exists and is now part of Louth County Council.	A vertical triband of red-black-red featuring the coat of arms of Drogheda in the centre. The town's motto reads: Deus praesidium, mercatura decustranslates, which means "God our strength, merchandise our glory".
	2013–present	The unofficial flag of Dún Laoghaire–Rathdown County Council was adopted in August 2014. It was originally designed and used for Bratacha 2013 – Ireland's first ever 'Festival of Flags and Emblems'. The design concept was based on a combination of the Dún Laoghaire–Rathdown County Council emblem, the coat of arms and on a loose translation of the County motto: Ó Chuan go Sliabh, meaning ‘from harbour to mountain’. Today the flag flies every weekend at the County Hall in the town of Dún Laoghaire.	A yellow field featuring a green shamrock and two strokes – green and blue. The green stroke represents the mountains, while the blue one stands for the sea. This reflects the fact that the county is bordered by the Irish Sea and the Wicklow Mountains.
		Flags of Derry City	The upper flag is simply a banner of arms, with the city arms: Sable a human skeleton Or seated upon a mossy stone proper and in dexter chief a castle triple towered Argent on a chief of the last a cross gules charged with a harp or and in the first quarter a sword erect also gules. The skeleton commemorates the many who starved to death during the Siege of Derry (1688–89). A red flag was hung from St Columb's Cathedral during the siege and a red (or crimson) flag has become a symbol of Protestant identity in the city, used by the Apprentice Boys of Derry, and the "bloody flag" is sometimes described as the flag of the city as well.
	2017–present	The Tallaght Unity Flag / An Bratach Aontacht Thamlachta	The Tallaght Unity Flag features a red deer. The green triangle in the lower hoist corner represents the landscape surrounding Tallaght. The flag also includes three blue eight-pointed stars on the fly side, reflecting a design captured during the Battle of Tallaght in 1867 and with blue representing inclusivity and unity.

== Sporting flags ==
Flag	Date	Use	Description
	1925–present	Flag of the Irish Rugby Football Union	The arms of the four provinces of Ireland emblazoned on a green flag with a shamrock shield at its centre.
	2000–present	The flag of Hockey Ireland was adopted in 2000 when the Irish Hockey Union and Irish Ladies Hockey Union merged.	The flag features a green field with a coat of arms quartered with the arms of the four provinces of Ireland. The association represents the whole island of Ireland and this is reflected in the flag.
		Flags used by Cricket Ireland	A green flag with three green shamrocks on a white and green cricket ball. A blue flag with three green shamrocks.

== Maritime flags ==
=== Waterways ===
Flag	Date	Use	Description
		Erne flag	Flown by boats on the Shannon-Erne Waterway, which bisects the Irish border. A horizontal tricolour of green, white, and blue.
		Ensign of the Inland Waterways Association of Ireland	A light blue field with the Irish flag in the canton and a wavy set of stripes in the fly: green, grey, white, grey, and green.
		Burgee of the Inland Waterways Association of Ireland	A green burgee divided in the centre by five horizontal wavy lines (three white and two grey).

=== Yacht and sailing clubs ===
Flag	Date	Use	Description
	2017–present	Ensign of the Blackrock Sailing Club	A grey field with the Irish flag in the canton and the club's burgee in the fly.
		Burgee of the Dublin Bay Sailing Club	A white burgee divided by a red Saint Patrick's saltire with a black anchor in the centre.
		Ensign of the Howth Yacht Club	A blue field with the Irish flag in the canton and a red anchor in the fly.
		Ensign of the Kinsale Yacht Club	A blue field with the Irish flag in the canton and a yellow portcullis in the fly.
		Ensign of the Lough Derg Yacht Club	An azure blue field with the Irish flag in the canton and a trio of gold shamrocks in the fly.
	pre–1945	Ensign of the National Yacht Club	An azure blue field with a gold harp in the centre.
	1945–present	Ensign of the National Yacht Club	An azure blue field with a silver harp and the Flag of Ireland in the canton.
	1801–1948	Ensign of the Royal Cork Yacht Club	The red ensign with the Union Jack defaced in the centre with a green square featuring a gold crown and harp.
		Ensign of the Royal Cork Yacht Club	A dark blue field with the Irish Flag in the canton and a harp in the fly, with three crowns (arranged two above and one below) beneath the harp, and the year "1720" beneath the crowns.
	1831–1846	Ensign of the Royal Irish Yacht Club	A white field divided by a red St. George's Cross, with a Union Jack in the canton, and a gold harp on a blue background in the lower fly.
		Ensign of the Royal Irish Yacht Club	A white field with the Irish Flag in the canton and a harp and crown in the fly.
		Ensign of the Royal North of Ireland Yacht Club	The blue ensign defaced in the fly with a yellow shamrock surmounted by a Saint Edward's Crown.
		Ensign of the Royal St. George Yacht Club	A dark blue field with the Irish Flag in the canton and a Tudor Crown in the fly.
		Ensign of the Royal Ulster Yacht Club	The blue ensign defaced in the fly with the Red Hand of Ulster on a white shield surmounted by Saint Edward's Crown.

=== House flags ===
Flag	Date	Use	Description
		House flag of the Belfast Steamship Company	A red pennant defaced with a white disc.
		House flag of the British and Irish Steam Packet Company	A red cross outlined in green on a white field.
		House flag of the City of Dublin Steam Packet Company	A white cross on a red field with a blue disc containing three flaming-towered castles in the centre of the cross.
		House flag of the Drogheda Steam Packet Company	A white crescent moon (facing upward) under a white five-pointed star on a green field.
		House flag of the Dundalk and Newry Steam Packet Company	A blue flag defaced with the initials "D&N" in red on a white disc.
	pre–1993	House flag of Guinness	A red swallowtail flag defaced with a black letter "G".
	1973–1978	House flag of Irish Continental Line	Saint Patrick's saltire defaced in the centre with a blue and white fleur-de-lis.
	1978–1988	House flag of Irish Continental Line	A green flag defaced with a white shamrock.
	1941–1947	House flag of Irish Shipping	Saint Patrick's saltire surrounded by the initials of the company.
	1947–1984	House flag of Irish Shipping	Saint Patrick's saltire surrounded by the arms of the four provinces.
		House flag of the Sligo Steam Navigation Company	A white flag with the initials of the company in red.
		House flag of the Waterford Steamship Company	A white flag divided by a red cross, with an initial of the company in each quarter.

=== Others ===
Flag	Date	Use	Description
	circa 1701 – post 1800	A Green Ensign flown by some Irish merchant vessels.	A gold harp on a green background with the English Flag in the canton.
	post 1800 – c.1922	A later version of the Green Ensign.	A gold harp on a green field with the Union Flag in the canton.
	1893–1907	Ensign of the Congested Districts Board for Ireland	A Blue Ensign with the letters "C.D.B." in red in the fly, with a crown above them and a harp below them.
	1907–1916	Ensign of the Congested Districts Board for Ireland	A Blue Ensign featuring a harp with a crown above it the fly, with the letter "C" to the left of the crown, the letter "D" above it and the letter "B" to the right of it, all surrounded by a red lozenge.
	circa 1900–1922	Ensign of the Department of Agriculture	A Blue Ensign with a white disc in the fly containing a smaller blue disc surrounded by a wreath of shamrocks in which there is a harp.
		Ensign of the Commissioners of Irish Lights	A Blue Ensign defaced with the commissioners' badge in the fly. Flown by CIL vessels in Northern Ireland.

== Historical military flags ==
Flag	Date	Use	Description
	1684–1922	Flag of the Royal Irish Regiment of the British Army. Also known as the 18th (Royal Irish) Regiment of Foot	
	1688–1791	Flag carried in different variations by the Irish Brigade of the French Army	Red and green cross, with motto "In Hoc Signo Vinces"
	1710–1815	Flag of the Regiment of Hibernia aka the "O'Neill's Regiment" of the Spanish Army	
	1770s–1780s	The flag of the Dublin Volunteers; a militia unit raised in Ireland during the late 1770s as part of the wider Irish Volunteer movement.	Red background featuring the St Patricks Cross (also the arms of the Duke of Leinster, who led the regiment).
	1770s–1780s	The flag of the Ormond Union Cavalry; a militia unit raised in Ireland during the late 1770s as part of the wider Irish Volunteer movement.	Features the motto "Pro aris et focis" ("For God and country")
	1770s–1780s	The flag of the Parsonstown Volunteers; a militia unit raised in Ireland during the late 1770s as part of the wider Irish Volunteer movement.	Features the motto "Vis unita fortior" ("United Strength is Stronger")
	1793–1881	Flag of the 86th (Royal County Down) Regiment of Foot of the British Army	
	1798	Flag carried by the United Irishmen at the Battle of Arklow	Green background with white Christian cross and the slogan "Liberty or Death".
	1803	Flag raised by Robert Emmet during the Irish rebellion of 1803	A green flag with a gold pike topped with a red phrygian cap, superimposed over which is a gold harp, and a gold scroll bearing the slogan "Erin Go Brah" in black beneath the harp.
	1846–1848	The green silk flag of the Saint Patrick's Battalion of the Mexican Army may have incorporated the old Irish harp flag (illustrated), which may date back to the Irish Confederacy. However, no original depictions are extant, and period descriptions of it differ.	Green background with Irish harp, shamrocks and Motto Erin Go Bragh in Gold
	1861–1864	Colour of the 28th Massachusetts Infantry regiment of the Irish Brigade (US) of the Union Army	Green background with Irish harp and motto Faugh a Ballagh (Clear the Way!)

== University flags ==
Flag	Date	Use	Description
		Flag of Trinity College Dublin	A banner of the college's coat of arms.
	1910–present	Flag of Queen's University Belfast is a heraldic banner that is based on its coat of arms which were granted on 24 March 1910, two years after the establishment of the university. The arms are similar to those used by the Queen's University of Ireland which existed from 1850 to 1879.	The banner is a Saint Patrick's Saltire that features a book, a sea horse, the Red Hand of Ulster, a harp and a British crown. The book stands for the university, the sea horse represents Belfast, the Red Hand is for Ulster, the harp symbolises Ireland and the crown is for the British monarchy. The university's arms are blazoned as: "Per saltire azure and argent, on a saltire gules, between in chief an open book and in base a harp both proper, in dexter a hand couped of the third, and in sinister a sea-horse vert gorged with a mural crown of the fourth, an Imperial crown of the last".
		Flag of the University of Dublin. Flown over Trinity College Dublin on commencements days.	The flag of the University of Dublin incorporates its coat of arms which were granted in the nineteenth century on a blue field.
		Flag of the Royal College of Surgeons in Ireland	A banner of the college's coat of arms.

== Organisations ==
Flag	Date	Use	Description
	2013–present	Flag of Vexillology Ireland was adopted by the Genealogical Society of Ireland on 4 July 2013. It was first used to represent the society at the 25th International Congress of Vexillology (ICV) in Rotterdam which was held from 4–10 August 2013.	The flag features a St. Patrick's blue (Azure) field, a gold (Or) harp with 12 vertical golden strings and a white (Argent) knotted rope (sheet bend) which stands for the International Federation of Vexillological Associations and is also an international symbol for vexillology. The official Pantone colours are: White, Blue 7455, Yellow 7409.
	1990–present	Flag of the Irish Traveller Movement	
	1970–present	Flag of the Commissioners of Irish Lights	Saint Patrick's saltire surrounded by a lightship sailing on the sea (in both the top and bottom sections) and a lighthouse standing on a rock in the sea (in both the left and right sections).
	pre–1970	Flag of the Commissioners of Irish Lights	Saint George's cross surrounded by a lighthouse standing on a rock in the sea (in both the first and fourth quarters) and a lightship sailing on the sea (in both the second and third quarters).

== Political flags ==
Flag	Date	Use	Description
	1800s	Earlier version of the Sunburst flag. This device was adopted by the Fenians in 1843.	A golden rising sun on a green field. It was supposedly based on earlier nationalist flags. It can be seen in the National Museum of Ireland, Dublin.
	1893–present	The Sunburst flag, based on the flag of the mythological warriors the Fianna.	Blue background with a golden sunburst showing partially in the bottom hoist corner. Used by nationalists and republicans.
		Flag of the Communist Party of Ireland, based on the original Sunburst flag.	A gold rising sun with nine rays against a red background, and a red hammer and sickle within the sun.
	1914–present	The Starry Plough Banner made its first appearance at an Irish Citizen Army meeting on 5 April 1914. It was flown on O'Connell Street above the Imperial Hotel (Clery's) during the 1916 Easter Rising. It was believed to have been destroyed but was later discovered. It had been seized by a British officer who returned the flag to the Irish government in 1955. The flag was in a decrepit condition until it was restored with funding from the Irish Labour Party in 2013 and displayed at the National Museum of Ireland – Decorative Arts and History. It is believed that the banner was designed by the art teacher William H. Megahy. His original drawing featured a blue rather than a green field and was presented to the National Museum in 1954 by the playwright Seán O'Casey who was the secretary of the Irish Citizen Army before the Easter Rising. A statue of James Connolly with a bronze depiction of the Starry Plough that featured on the banner is located underneath the railway bridge on Beresford Place in Dublin. It was at this location that Connolly frequently addressed political and trade union rallies. The banner is still used today in the form of a flag by certain Irish socialist groups.	The banner features a green field bordered by a gilt fringe with a gold stylised representation of an agricultural plough that is superimposed by seven silver stars forming the constellation Ursa Major, commonly known as 'the Plough'.
	1934–present	"In 1934, the largest trade union, the Irish Transport and General Workers Union (ITGWU), introduced a simplified version of the Starry Plough with a sky-blue field, resembling the Alaskan flag adopted 7 years earlier. It was adopted as the emblem of the Irish Labour movement, including the Irish Labour Party, although they eventually dropped it". Today the flag is used by various Irish socialist, nationalist and republican groups.	The Starry Plough flag (An Camchéachta) features a light/dark blue field with seven five-pointed white stars forming the constellation Ursa Major, commonly known as 'the Plough'.
	1916	On 24 April 1916, a flag with the inscription 'Irish Republic' was hoisted alongside the Irish tricolour over the General Post Office, Dublin during the 1916 Easter Rising as a proclamation of the Irish Republic. A photograph was taken of it flying on the south-eastern corner of the GPO by a guest staying in the Metropole Hotel. "It remained on the roof throughout the week, survived the bombardment and the fire which destroyed the G.P.O and was eventually removed by the troops after the insurgents' surrender, either on Sunday, 30 April or on the following day. A photograph taken at the time shows a group of soldiers holding it upside down at the base of the Parnell Monument in O'Connell Street. Thereafter, it was placed in the Imperial War Museum, London. It was presented by the British government to the Irish government on the fiftieth anniversary of the rising in 1966".	The flag features a green field with the inscription "Irish Republic" written in white and yellow (gold) letters in the form of Gaelic script. It measures 4 feet 3 inches by 5 feet 6 inches and is now on display at the National Museum of Ireland – Decorative Arts and History.
	1858	Flags used by the Fenian Brotherhood which was founded in Dublin on St Patrick's Day 1858.	Two flags used in the past by the Fenian Brotherhood. The first flag is based on the American 'Stars and Stripes' It has four bars representing the provinces of Ireland and 32 stars representing the counties. The second flag is a green banner defaced with 32 gold stars to represent the Irish counties. It was captured from the Fenians during the Battle of Tallaght, 1867.
	1932–1933	Historical flag of the Blueshirts paramilitary group, associated with Fine Gael. It bore the St. Patrick's Saltire defacing a dark blue background.	A red saltire on a blue field.
		Flag of the Orange Order, a Protestant fraternal organisation based mainly in Northern Ireland, though it has lodges throughout the Commonwealth and a small number in the Republic of Ireland.	An orange field with a purple five-pointed star in the lower fly and a St. George's Cross in the canton.
		The Purple Standard, used by some Orange Order marching groups.	A purple field with an orange five-pointed star in the lower fly and a St. George's Cross in the canton. Effectively an inverted version of the primary Orange Order flag.
		Flag of the Apprentice Boys of Derry, a Protestant fraternal organisation based in Derry City, Northern Ireland.	A crimson field.

== Religious flags ==
Flag	Date	Use	Description
	1932	A flag designed for the 1932 Eucharistic Congress in Dublin, which was carried to various ceremonies during the event.	A gold symbol of the Eucharistic Congress on a light blue field.

== Former national flag proposals ==
Flag	Date	Use	Description
	Proposed in 1951	Flag endorsed by both Sligo and Dublin County Councils. This proposal involved adding a blue Celtic cross to the centre of the Irish tricolour to symbolise the Christianity and Faith of the Irish people. It appeared in the Drogheda Independent on 13 January 1951.	The Irish tricolour defaced with a blue Celtic cross in the centre.

== See also ==
- Cross-border flag for Ireland
- GAA county colours
- List of flags used in Northern Ireland
- Northern Ireland flags issue
