= List of flags used in Northern Ireland =

This is a list of flags used in Northern Ireland.

== Official flags ==
=== Current ===
These are the flags used by the UK Government, the police and the Monarch in Northern Ireland.

Flag	Date	Use	Description
	Since 1801	The Union Flag, commonly known as the Union Jack, is the flag of the United Kingdom.	A superposition of the flags of England, Scotland, and the St Patrick's Flag of Ireland.
	Since 1837	The Royal Standard of the United Kingdom. It is the banner of King Charles III in his capacity as King of the United Kingdom.	Split into quadrants, the first and fourth quadrants contain three gold lions passant on a red field (representing England); the second quadrant contains a red lion rampant on a gold field (representing Scotland); the third quadrant contains a gold harp on a blue field (representing Ireland).
	Since 2002	The service flag of the Police Service of Northern Ireland is the only flag permitted to be flown at police stations and by police vessels.	Green field charged with the emblem of the PSNI at the centre.

=== Former ===
Flag	Date	Use	Description
	1783 onward	St Patrick's Saltire, also known as the Cross of St Patrick, after the patron saint of Ireland. Adopted by the chivalric Order of St Patrick in 1783, based on the arms of the FitzGerald dynasty. The flag appears within the Union Flag now the official flag of the United Kingdom. It is used by some Unionists, the Church of Ireland and is incorporated into symbols and emblems of various organisations and bodies throughout Ireland.	A red saltire on a white field.
	1801–1922	Flag of the Lord Lieutenant of Ireland	A Union Jack defaced with the Coat of arms of Ireland.
	1924–1973	Personal flag of the governor of Northern Ireland.	A Union Jack defaced with the Coat of arms of Northern Ireland.
	1924–1953	The Ulster Banner, officially known as the Northern Ireland flag. Variant with the Tudor Crown used between 1924 and 1953.	
	1953–1972	The Ulster Banner, officially known as the Northern Ireland flag, was the flag of the former Government of Northern Ireland. It is used by the unionist community but no longer has any official status, although several sporting organisations such as FIFA, the Commonwealth Games Federation and the PGA Tour and media organisations such as ESPN currently use the flag to represent teams and athletes from Northern Ireland.	A red cross on a white field defaced with the Red Hand of Ulster, crowned on a six pointed white star (representing the six counties in Northern Ireland). Based on the flag of Ulster.
	1929–1973	Ensign of the former Northern Ireland government.	The Blue Ensign defaced with the letters GNI in the fly. Used on vessels of the Northern Ireland government.

== Local government flags ==
=== Current ===
Flag	Date	Use	Description
		The flag of the city of Belfast.	Banner of the arms of Belfast City Council.

=== Former ===
Flag	Date	Use	Description
		The flag of the city of Derry.	Banner of the arms of Derry City Council.

== University flags ==
Flag	Date	Use	Description
	1910–present	Flag of Queen's University Belfast is a heraldic banner that is based on its coat of arms which were granted on 24 March 1910, two years after the establishment of the university. The arms are similar to those used by the Queen's University of Ireland which existed from 1850 to 1879.	The banner is a Saint Patrick's Saltire that features a book, a sea horse, the Red Hand of Ulster, a harp and a British crown. The book stands for the university, the sea horse represents Belfast, the Red Hand is for Ulster, the harp symbolises Ireland and the crown is for the British monarchy. The university's arms are blazoned as: "Per saltire azure and argent, on a saltire gules, between in chief an open book and in base a harp both proper, in dexter a hand couped of the third, and in sinister a sea-horse vert gorged with a mural crown of the fourth, an Imperial crown of the last".

== Maritime flags ==
Flag	Date	Use	Description
		House flag of the Belfast, Mersey and Manchester Steamship Company	A red flag defaced with the initials "BMM" in black on a white lozenge.
		House flag of the Belfast Steamship Company	A red pennant defaced with a white disc.
		House flag of the Clanrye Steamship Company	A red flag defaced with a white letter "C".
		Ensign of the Commissioners of Irish Lights	The blue ensign defaced with the commissioners' badge in the fly. Flown by CIL vessels in Northern Ireland.
	1994	"Erne Flag" used on the Shannon–Erne Waterway.	Triband of green, white and blue.
		House flag of the Larne and Stranraer Steamboat Company	A red pennant defaced with a Red Hand of Ulster on a white lozenge.
		House flag of the Londonderry Steamers	A flag divided into vertical triangles of blue and yellow.
		House flag of the Lord Line (Irish Shipowners Company)	A blue flag defaced with a white shamrock lying on its side, the top facing towards the fly.
		Ensign of the Royal North of Ireland Yacht Club	The blue ensign defaced in the fly with a yellow shamrock beneath a Saint Edward's Crown.
		Ensign of the Royal Ulster Yacht Club	The blue ensign defaced with the Red Hand of Ulster and St Edward's Crown.
		House flag of the Shamrock Shipping Company	A blue pennant divided by a red cross, with a white letter "S" entwined around the centre of the cross.
		House flag of the Ulster Steamship Company	A blue flag defaced in the centre with a white shield bearing a Red Hand of Ulster above three drops of blood, and the company's initials in the hoist.

== Sporting flags ==
=== Northern Ireland ===
Current

Flag	Date	Use	Description
		The Ulster Banner is used to represent Northern at the Commonwealth Games, Commonwealth Youth Games and in international football, international darts and the PGA Tour.	A red cross on a white field defaced with the Red Hand of Ulster, crowned on a six pointed white star.
		The St Patrick's Saltire is used to represent Northern Ireland in international volleyball.	A red saltire on a white field.

Former

Flag	Date	Use	Description
	1934	Flag used to represent Northern Ireland at the 1934 British Empire Games	A blue ensign defaced with the coat of arms of Northern Ireland.

=== Island of Ireland ===
Flag	Date	Use	Description
		Flag used by the Ireland national cricket team.	A green flag with three green shamrocks on a white and green cricket ball.
		Flag used by the Ireland national hockey team.	Arms of the four provinces combined on a shield, with two stags on the crest and the motto "IRELAND", on a green field.
		Flag used by the Ireland national rugby union team.	The four provincial arms and the IRFU insignia in the centre, on a light green field. NOTE: At Rugby World Cups the team is represented by the Flag of Ireland and the Flag of Ulster.

=== Gaelic games colours ===
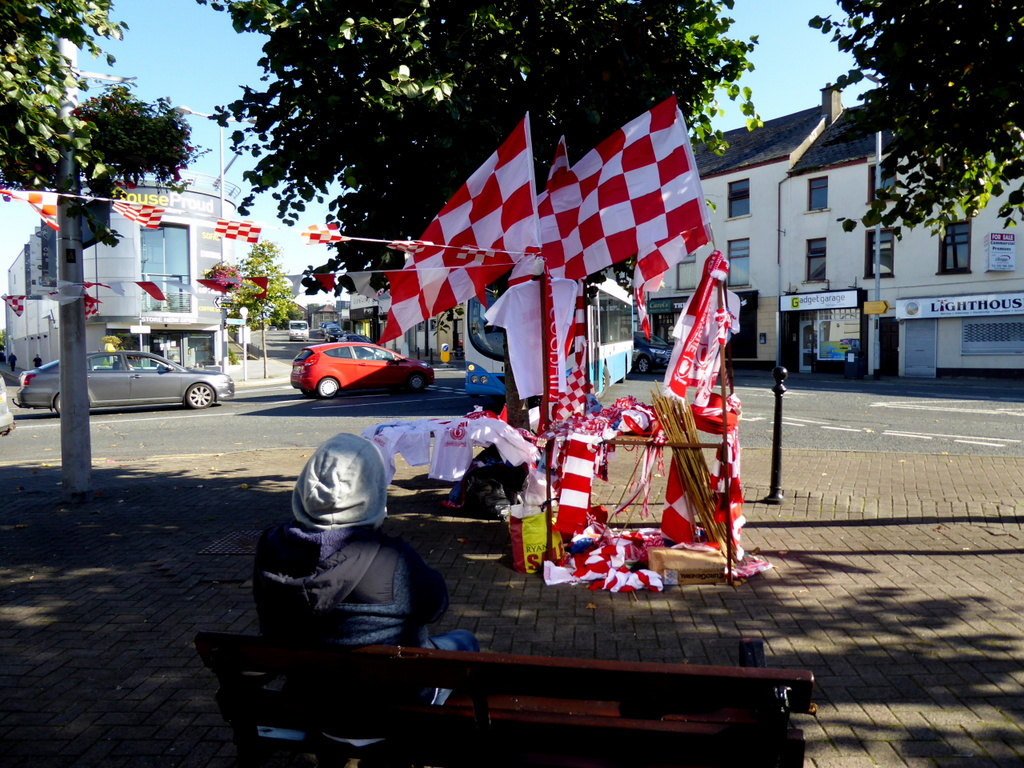
Tyrone county flags for sale in Strabane, 2018.

County colours are used to represent Irish counties in the Gaelic games of hurling, Gaelic football, camogie and ladies' Gaelic football. These flags do not have a standardised form, with the colours usually displayed as vertical bicolours or in a chequered pattern.

Flag	Date	Use	Description
		Ulster	Gold and black
	1910	County Antrim	Saffron and white, adopted from the Seaghan an Diomáis club of West Belfast.
	1926	County Armagh	Orange and white, from jerseys knitted by Poor Clare nuns from Omeath, County Louth.
	1947	County Derry	White and red
	1933	County Down	Red and black
	1910s	County Fermanagh	Green and white, from the colours of the prominent Teemore club.
	c. 1927	County Tyrone	White and red, from the Red Hand of Ulster.

== Others ==
Flag	Date	Use	Description
	Since 1264	The Flag of Ulster is used to represent the traditional province of Ulster.	A red cross on a golden field. The arms of the historic province of Ulster is a composite achievement, combining the heraldic symbols of two of that province’s best known families; namely the cross of the de Burgh family, Earls of Ulster, and the dexter hand of O'Neill (Ua Néill, later Ó Néill) Kings of Ailech and Tír Eoghan.
	Since 1919	Flag of the Republic of Ireland was originally designed to represent all of Ireland, but is currently only the official flag of the Republic of Ireland. Often seen flying from lampposts and homes in nationalist areas of Northern Ireland.	A Tricolour, with three equal vertical bands of green (hoist side), white and orange. The Flag is a metaphor for the peace, equality and co-operation (white) between Catholics (green) and Protestants (orange).
	1916	On 24 April 1916, a flag with the inscription 'Irish Republic' was hoisted alongside the Irish tricolour over the General Post Office, Dublin during the 1916 Easter Rising as a proclamation of the Irish Republic, which claimed the entire island of Ireland as its territory. The flag is still used by Irish nationalists.	The flag features a green field with the inscription "Irish Republic" written in white and yellow (gold) letters in the form of Gaelic script. It measures 4 feet 3 inches by 5 feet 6 inches and is now on display at the National Museum of Ireland – Decorative Arts and History.
	Since 1893	The Sunburst flag is based on the flag of mythological warriors the Fianna. Used by nationalists.	Blue background with an orange sun showing partially in the lower hoist.
	Since 1930s	The starry plough flag succeeded the starry plough banner; the flag used to represent Irish nationalist socialism. Used by socialists, trade unionists and nationalists.	Light blue background and white stars.
		Flag of a proposed independent Ulster nation. Used by Ulster nationalists, although it has now been adopted as an Ulster-Scots flag.	St Patrick's Saltire with the background of St Andrew's Saltire, defaced with a golden six pointed star representing the six counties of Northern Ireland, containing the red hand of Ulster.
		Flag of the Ulster Volunteer Force. Often seen flying from lampposts and homes in loyalist areas.	Similar to Boyne Standard. Purple background with orange border and English flag in the canton and a UVF emblem in the lower fly. The letters"U.V.F." and "1912" are shown diagonally in the centre of the flag.
		Flag of the Ulster Defence Association. Often seen flying from lampposts and homes in loyalist areas.	Light blue background with red border and UDA emblem on the hoist (left-hand) side and the words "ULSTER DEFENCE ASSOCIATION" on the fly (right-hand) side.
		Flag of the Ulster Freedom Fighters. Often seen flying from lampposts and homes in loyalist areas.	Black background with yellow border and UFF emblem in the centre.
		Flag of the Loyalist Volunteer Force. Often seen flying from lampposts in LVF strongholds such as Ballycraigy.	Black background with white border and LVF emblem in the centre with three of the six counties of Northern Ireland on both sides. Two yellow banner one at the top and one at the bottom, Top banner says "Loyalist Volunteer Force" and bottom says "In defence of our heritage and culture".
		Flag of the Orange Order. Mostly used in relation to the Orange Order and Orange Walks on The Twelfth.	Orange background with a St. George's Cross in the canton and defaced with a purple Williamite five-pointed star in the lower fly.
		The Purple Standard, used by some Orange Order marching groups.	Purple background with a St. George's Cross in the canton and defaced with an orange five-pointed star in the lower fly. Effectively an inverted version of the primary Orange Order flag.
		Flag of the Apprentice Boys of Derry, a Protestant fraternal organisation based in Derry City.	A crimson field.
	Since 1970	Flag of the Commissioners of Irish Lights	Saint Patrick's saltire surrounded by a lightship sailing on the sea (in both the top and bottom sections) and a lighthouse standing on a rock in the sea (in both the left and right sections).
	pre–1970	Flag of the Commissioners of Irish Lights	Saint George's cross surrounded by a lighthouse standing on a rock in the sea (in both the first and fourth quarters) and a lightship sailing on the sea (in both the second and third quarters).

== Proposed flags ==
Flag	Date	Use	Description
	Proposed in 1995	Northern Ireland Office proposal.	
	Proposed in 1995	Northern Ireland Office proposal.	
	Proposed in 2003	Alliance Party proposal	Blue with a gold silhouette map of Northern Ireland.
	Proposed in 2021	"Civic Flag" proposed by the Commission on Flags, Identity, Culture and Tradition	The commission suggested that the design for a new civic flag should incorporate expressions of Britishness and Irishness and should also represent the diversity of the community in Northern Ireland.

== Timeline ==
Flag	Date	Use	Description
	1921–1924	Flag of Ireland.	Saint Patrick's Flag.
	1924–1953	First flag of Northern Ireland.	Ulster Banner.
	1953–1972	Second flag of Northern Ireland.	Ulster Banner.

== See also ==
- Flag of Northern Ireland
- Northern Ireland flags issue
- List of flags of Ireland
- Cross-border flag for Ireland
- Coat of arms of Northern Ireland
