= Northern Ireland flags issue =

Regional dispute

The Northern Ireland flags issue is one that divides the population along sectarian lines. Depending on political allegiance, people identify with differing flags and symbols, some of which have, or have had, official status in Northern Ireland. Northern Ireland has not had its own unique flag since 1972, although the former flag continues to be used in some contexts.

== Common flags ==
Union Jack

Ulster Banner

Flag of Ireland

Flag of Ulster (representing the entire nine-county province)

Saint Patrick's Saltire

- The flag of the United Kingdom, the Union Jack or Union Flag, is the only flag routinely used officially by the sovereign UK government, as well as being flown on most council buildings in Northern Ireland. The Union Flag is often flown by unionists but is disliked by nationalists. British law states that the Union Flag must be flown on designated days from central government buildings in Northern Ireland.
- The Ulster Banner, the flag of the pre-1973 government of Northern Ireland, was used from 1953 to 1972 by the Stormont government to represent the government of Northern Ireland. That government was granted a royal warrant to fly the Ulster Banner in 1924, but this expired when the government was dissolved under the Northern Ireland Constitution Act 1973. It continues to be used by some sports teams representing Northern Ireland internationally, for example by the Northern Ireland football team, and by the Northern Ireland Commonwealth Games team.
- The flag of Ireland or Irish tricolour is the state flag of the Republic of Ireland, disliked by Unionists and is regarded by republicans and nationalists as the flag of all of Ireland. It has sometimes been mistakenly used to represent Northern Ireland by Great Britain-based bodies, such as the BBC.
- The Saint Patrick's Saltire represents Northern Ireland indirectly as Ireland in the Union Jack. It is sometimes flown during Saint Patrick's Day parades in Northern Ireland, and is used to represent Northern Ireland during some royal events.
- Other flags flown by republicans include the Starry Plough, the Sunburst flag and even the flag of the Ulster province. Loyalists sometimes display the flag of Scotland as a sign of their Scottish ancestry. Ulster nationalists use the unofficial 'Ulster Nation flag', although it has now been adopted as an Ulster-Scots flag.

== Controversies ==
The Flags and Emblems (Display) Act (Northern Ireland) 1954 prohibited the display of any flag which was "likely to cause a breach of public order", and gave the police powers to deal with it. However, it specifically excluded the Union Jack from its provisions. In 1956, the Stormont Minister of Affairs, George Hanna, banned an Irish Nationalist cultural demonstration planned for the annual Feis at Newtownbutler, County Fermanagh. The march proceeded anyway, and in response the Royal Ulster Constabulary (RUC) launched a baton charge to seize a banner depicting Patrick Pearse but were unsuccessful. Police attempted a second baton charge which also failed and then resorted to using fire hoses against the crowds. Several people were injured during the disturbances, at least one seriously. The RUC had removed three Irish tricolours from the home of a parish priest during the previous year's Feis. In 1964, the RUC moved in to remove an Irish tricolour from the window of an office in Belfast, after Ian Paisley had publicly said that if they did not, he would do so personally. This resulted in serious rioting. The Act was repealed in 1987.

In some loyalist areas, the flying of flags supporting loyalist paramilitaries has proved controversial. Groups like the Ulster Defence Association, Ulster Volunteer Force, Young Citizen Volunteers, Red Hand Commando, and Loyalist Volunteer Force all have their own unique flags and although these flags usually appear alongside murals, they can occasionally be seen flying from lampposts in villages and towns or flying from houses in the run-up to the Twelfth.

After the 1998 Good Friday Agreement, flags continue to be a source of disagreement in Northern Ireland. The Agreement states that:

All participants acknowledge the sensitivity of the use of symbols and emblems for public purposes, and the need in particular in creating the new institutions to ensure that such symbols and emblems are used in a manner which promotes mutual respect rather than division.

Some local councils have debated the usage of the Tricolour. In 2002 Belfast City Council displayed the Tricolour along with the Union Flag in the Lord Mayor's parlour during the term of Sinn Féin Lord Mayor Alex Maskey. A different approach was taken in 1997; when the Social Democratic and Labour Party's (SDLP) Alban Maginness was Lord Mayor, neither flag was displayed. In September 2003, Belfast City Council discussed flying the Tricolour alongside the Union Flag on designated occasions.

In June 2007 the designated nationalist Social Democratic and Labour Party complained about an artist's rendering of IKEA Belfast that included both the Union Flag and the Ulster Banner flag as two of the three flags in front of the store. After being labelled "an upmarket Orange hall" by the party, IKEA assured customers and co-workers that only the Swedish flag would be seen outside the actual store.

The Ulster Banner continued to be used by some local governments, such as the predominantly unionist Castlereagh, which flew it outside its offices.

A decision in December 2012 to fly the Union flag over Belfast City Hall only on certain designated days, instead of all the year round as previously, led to the Belfast City Hall flag protests, which included riots in which police officers were injured.

The Northern Ireland flag issue has led to Unicode being unable to release an equivalent country emoji for Northern Ireland, as it has for Scotland, England, and Wales. Jeremy Burge, Chief Emoji Officer at Emojipedia and member of the Unicode Consortium's emoji subcommittee said, "The real issue is that Northern Ireland has no official flag other than the Union Flag."

== Flag proposals ==
=== 1995 Northern Ireland Office proposals ===
In 1995, the Northern Ireland Office discussed the possibility of a new distinct flag for Northern Ireland. Two designs by Dr. Martin J. Ball of Ulster University were considered, but no flag was ultimately adopted.

=== 2003 Alliance Party proposals ===
In 2003, the Alliance Party of Northern Ireland proposed that a new flag should be adopted to represent all communities in Northern Ireland. Suggestions included a blue flax flower on a white field, a gold map of Northern Ireland on a dark blue field and a representation of the Giant's Causeway.

2003 flag proposal by the Alliance Party of Northern Ireland

=== 2009 Eddie Izzard proposal ===
In 2009, Eddie Izzard ran a series of marathons across the United Kingdom to raise money for Sport Relief. When running in England, Scotland and Wales, Izzard carried the respective flag of that nation. For Northern Ireland, however, Izzard carried a self-created flag consisting of a green field (invoking the colour of the Northern Ireland football jersey) and a white dove (symbolising peace) in the upper fly, flying eastwards and carrying an olive branch in its beak.

The dove flag as part of a combined Home Nations flag, which was carried by Izzard in the Sport Relief Mile event in London on 21 March 2010.

=== 2013 Haass talks ===
In 2013, US diplomat Richard Haass chaired talks between the political parties in Northern Ireland dealing with, among other things, the issue of flags. The resulting draft proposals, which were not agreed to by the parties, included the idea of a new flag for Northern Ireland, and the possibility of a "circumscribed role for the sovereign flag of Ireland in conjunction with the Union flag."

=== 2021 proposed "Civic Flag" ===
In December 2021, the Commission on Flags, Identity, Culture and Tradition (FICT) published its final report which included a recommendation that a new "Civic Flag for Northern Ireland" should be adopted and be flown at buildings of the Northern Ireland Executive, Northern Ireland Assembly and local district councils in Northern Ireland. The commissions suggested that the design for the new flag should incorporate expressions of Britishness and Irishness and should also represent the diversity of the community in Northern Ireland. The working group on flags, identity, culture and tradition last met in January 2022, prior to the collapse of the power sharing executive the following month. In November 2024, the Executive Office said that the Commission's report will be "considered as part of a review of its community relations strategy".

=== 2024 Northern Ireland Commonwealth Games Council proposal ===
In November 2024, the Northern Ireland Commonwealth Games Council (NICGC) discussed the possibility of using its own flag at the Commonwealth Games if a new "Civic Flag" proposed by the Commission on Flags, Identity, Culture and Traditions is not in place before the 2026 Commonwealth Games. The NICGC was subsequently forced to close its offices for security reasons after receiving threats from Loyalist paramilitary groups.

Flag of the Northern Ireland Commonwealth Games Council: the palm and thumb form the letters NI = Northern Ireland

== See also ==
- Flag of Northern Ireland
- List of flags of Ireland
- List of United Kingdom flags
- List of flags used in Northern Ireland
- Cross-border flag for Ireland
- Party Processions Act 1850, an act which banned "any Banner, Emblem, Flag or Symbol, the Display whereof may be calculated or tend to provoke Animosity between different Classes of Her Majesty's Subjects"
- Kerb painting
- Coat of arms of Northern Ireland
