= Ulster flag (disambiguation) =

Ulster flag is the flag of Ulster, one of the four provinces of Ireland.

Ulster flag may also refer to:

- The Ulster Banner, the flag of the Government of Northern Ireland, and de facto flag of Northern Ireland, from 1953 to 1972
- The other flags used in Northern Ireland
