= Flag of Northern Ireland =

Flag of the United Kingdom, the Union Flag

The Ulster Banner with Tudor Crown, used 1924–1953 officially

The Ulster Banner with St Edward's Crown, used 1953–1972 officially

Saint Patrick's Saltire

There is no official flag for Northern Ireland except for the Union Flag of the United Kingdom as a whole. No de jure local flag represents Northern Ireland specifically.

The Ulster Banner was used by the Northern Irish government from 1953 until the government and parliament were abolished in 1973. Since then, it has had no official status. However, it is still used as the flag of Northern Ireland by both loyalists and unionists and to represent Northern Ireland internationally in some sporting competitions, like the Commonwealth Games.

The Saint Patrick's Saltire represents Northern Ireland indirectly as Ireland in the Union Flag. It is sometimes flown during Saint Patrick's Day parades in Northern Ireland and is used to represent Northern Ireland during some royal events.

The flying of various flags in Northern Ireland is a significant sectarian issue, with different communities identifying with different flags.

Since at least as early as 2013, there have been calls for a new, neutral flag for Northern Ireland, including as a recommendation by the Commission on Flags, Identity, Culture and Tradition in December 2021.

== Flag of the Government of Northern Ireland (1924–1973) ==
The Ulster Banner, also known as the Red Hand Flag or the Ulster Flag (not to be confused with the provincial Flag of Ulster), was the flag that was granted a royal warrant for use to the Government of Northern Ireland in 1924. In common with other British flags, any civic status of the flag was not defined in law.

The Government of Northern Ireland was granted arms by royal warrant and had the right to display these arms on a flag or banner. This right was exercised for the coronation of Queen Elizabeth II in 1953 when the banner was flown for the first time over Parliament Buildings in honor of Elizabeth's visit. Also during her visit, on 1 July 1953, the Minister for Home Affairs announced that, while the Union Flag was the only standard officially recognized, those who wished to have a distinctive Ulster symbol might use the banner. When the Parliament of Northern Ireland was dissolved by the British government under the Northern Ireland Constitution Act 1973, the flag ceased to be used by a body with a royal warrant but remains the only flag to date which represents Northern Ireland at international level in sport.

Since the Northern Ireland government and parliament were abolished in 1972, the use of the Ulster Banner among loyalists has increased.

== Official use of flags ==
There are various practices for the flying of flags by public bodies in Northern Ireland. The Flags Regulations (Northern Ireland) Order 2000 requires that the Union Flag be flown over specified government buildings including Parliament Buildings and state offices on specified "named days" (for example, it was traditionally used to honour the late Queen Elizabeth II's official birthday).

The regulations also provide that, on the occasion of a visit to a government building by the British Monarch, the Royal Standard shall be flown, and the Union Flag can be flown, and on state visits from other heads of state the Union Flag and the national flag of the country of the visitor can be flown. The regulations prohibit any flags being flown from the relevant buildings except as expressly permitted by the regulations.

When flags representing the "Home Countries" of England, Northern Ireland, Scotland and Wales are flown at official ceremonies, Northern Ireland is sometimes represented by the Saint Patrick's Cross, for instance on the barge Gloriana during the 2012 Thames Diamond Jubilee Pageant. In May 2016, the Ulster Banner was flown from horseback during the Musical Ride of the Household Cavalry at the Queen's 90th birthday celebration at Windsor, alongside the flags of England, Scotland and Wales.

Other regulations exist for other public bodies in Northern Ireland. Use of flags by the Police Service of Northern Ireland is governed by the Police Emblems and Flags Regulations (Northern Ireland) 2002, which provides that no flag shall be used by the service except for its own flag.

=== Local authorities ===
Legislation relating to flag flying does not apply to district council buildings, and district councils follow a range of practices varying from flying the Union Flag on a number of council buildings every day of the year as at Lisburn, to flying no flags on any building, flying only the council flag or flying flags on the designated days in the same way as government buildings.

In 2004, Belfast City Council commissioned a study on the flying of the Union Flag which noted that the Ulster Banner was flown alongside it by three unionist-controlled district councils at that time: Ards, Carrickfergus and Castlereagh. These councils have since been replaced.

== Displaying flags ==
In Northern Ireland, some members from each of the unionist and nationalist communities use flags to declare their political allegiances and to mark territory. Unionists and loyalists fly the Union Flag and Ulster Banner to show their support for the union and/or their allegiance to Northern Ireland. Irish nationalists and republicans fly the Irish tricolour to show their support for a United Ireland.

After the 1998 Good Friday Agreement, flags continue to be a source of disagreement in Northern Ireland. The Agreement states that:

All participants acknowledge the sensitivity of the use of symbols and emblems for public purposes, and the need in particular in creating the new institutions to ensure that such symbols and emblems are used in a manner which promotes mutual respect rather than division.

Nationalists pointed to this to argue that the use of the Union Flag for official purposes should be restricted, or that the Irish tricolour should be flown alongside the British flag on government buildings. Sinn Féin ministers in the power-sharing Northern Ireland Executive instructed that the Union Flag was not to fly from buildings operated by their respective departments. This power was removed from ministers by virtue of the Flag Regulations (Northern Ireland) Order 2000, mentioned above.

All signatories to the Good Friday Agreement also declare their acceptance of the "principle of consent" (i.e. that there will be no change to the constitutional position of Northern Ireland unless a majority votes for it), and Unionists argued that this provision amounts to recognising that the Union Flag is the only legitimate official flag in Northern Ireland. The problem was discussed in detail and various proposals made including suggestions for a new flag.

== Flag proposals ==
=== Haass talks ===
In 2013, American diplomat Richard N. Haass chaired talks between the political parties in Northern Ireland dealing with, among other things, the issue of flags. The resulting draft proposals, which were not agreed to by the parties, included the idea of a new flag for Northern Ireland, and the possibility of a "circumscribed role for the sovereign flag of Ireland in conjunction with the Union flag."

=== Proposed "Civic Flag" ===
In December 2021, the Commission on Flags, Identity, Culture and Tradition published its final report which included a recommendation that a new "Civic Flag for Northern Ireland" should be adopted and be flown at buildings of the Northern Ireland Executive, Northern Ireland Assembly and local district councils in Northern Ireland. The commissions suggested that the design for the new flag should incorporate expressions of Britishness and Irishness and should also represent the diversity of the community in Northern Ireland. The working group on flags, identity, culture and tradition last met in January 2022, prior to the collapse of the power sharing executive the following month. In November 2024, the Executive Office said that the Commission's report will be "considered as part of a review of its community relations strategy".

== International sport ==
The Ulster Banner is used to represent the Northern Ireland team at the Commonwealth Games, to represent golfers on the PGA Tour, and by FIFA to represent the Northern Ireland national football team.

The International Volleyball Federation uses the Saint Patrick's Saltire to represent the Northern Ireland national volleyball team.

In November 2024, the Northern Ireland Commonwealth Games Council (NICGC) discussed the possibility of using its own flag at the Commonwealth Games if a new "Civic Flag" proposed by the Commission on Flags, Identity, Culture and Traditions is not in place before the 2026 Commonwealth Games. The proposal to replace the Ulster Banner was met with criticism from politicians and activists. Following the announcement, NICGC chief executive Conal Heatley reported receiving "threatening and abusive language on social media", prompting the temporary closure of its office while a security assessment was undertaken.

Flag of the Northern Ireland Commonwealth Games Council

Flag used to represent Northern Ireland at the 1934 British Empire Games

== See also ==
- Northern Ireland flags issue
- List of flags used in Northern Ireland
- Coat of arms of Northern Ireland
- List of flags of Ireland
- List of flags of the United Kingdom
