= Great Seal of Ireland (disambiguation) =

The Great Seal of Ireland was the seal used before 1922 by the Dublin Castle administration in Ireland to authenticate important state documents.

Great Seal of Ireland may also refer to the:

- Great Seal of Ireland introduced by Oliver Cromwell in 1655, see Great Seal of the Realm
- Seal of the president of Ireland introduced in 1937

== See also ==
- Great Seal of Northern Ireland
- Great Seal of the Irish Free State
