= Orange flag =

Orange flag may refer to:

- Symbolic flag of the Maratha Empire
- One of the main symbols of Christian democracy political ideology
- Flag of the Orange Order
- Flag of the Orange Free State
- NetBSD logo
