= Flag of Ireland =

- "the tricolour" (an trídhathach)
- Use: National flag and ensign
- Proportion: 1∶2
- Adopted: 1922 (constitutional status; 1937)
- Design: A vertical tricolour of green, white and orange

The national flag of Ireland (Irish: bratach na hÉireann), frequently referred to in Ireland as "the tricolour" (an trídhathach) and elsewhere as the Irish tricolour, is a vertical tricolour of green (at the hoist), white and orange. The proportions of the flag are 1:2 (that is to say, flown horizontally, the flag is half as high as it is wide).

It was intended to symbolise the inclusion and hoped-for union between Roman Catholics (symbolised by the green colour) and Protestants (symbolised by the orange colour). The symbol first appeared in green-orange format when a green and orange cockade (rosette) was worn to symbolise a proposed Irish Catholic and Protestant unity at a political event in Cork City, March 1830. White was added to create the first Irish tricolour by Emelia Eleanor Hamilton of Annadale, Dublin in a tricolour cockade (rosette) of green, orange and white. She sent the symbol as a gift to be presented to a meeting taking place in September 1830 to send salutations to the French on the July Revolution. With the cockade she sent a letter with the words 'Let orange and green, no longer be seen, b'stained by the blood of our island', creating the message of peaceful union familiar in the Irish Tricolour today.

Within months the symbol was adopted by the Repeal Campaign of Daniel O'Connell in December 1830, seeing regular use in the early 1830s in flag, banner and other forms. The Irish Tricolour was later adopted by the Young Irelanders in 1848 who formalised the white to the centre which beforehand had been inconsistent, a speech by Thomas Francis Meagher stating, "The white in the centre signifies a lasting truce between Orange and Green and I trust that beneath its folds the hands of Irish Protestants and Irish Catholics may be clasped in generous and heroic brotherhood".

The flag saw ongoing if sporadic use in public and adoption by secret societies between 1850 and 1910, but It was not until the Easter Rising of 1916, when it was raised above Dublin's General Post Office by Gearóid O'Sullivan, that the tricolour came to be regarded as the national flag. The flag was adopted by the Irish Republic during the Irish War of Independence (1919–1921). The flag's use was continued by the Irish Free State (1922–1937) and it was later given constitutional status under the 1937 Constitution of Ireland. The tricolour has been used by nationalists on both sides of the border as the national flag of the whole island since 1916. It is thus flown by many nationalists in Northern Ireland as well as by the Gaelic Athletic Association.

== Design and symbolism ==
=== Design ===
Concerning the national flag of Ireland, the Constitution of Ireland simply states in Article 7:

The national flag is the tricolour of green, white and orange.

The Department of the Taoiseach takes general responsibility for matters relating to the flag. In its advisory role, the department has issued guidelines to assist the use of the flag; these state that it should be rectangular in shape, its length should be double its width, and the three coloured pales – green, white and orange – should be of equal size and vertically disposed.

The precise colours of the flag as set by the Department of the Taoiseach since at least 2001 are:

Scheme	Green	White	Orange	Sources
Pantone	347	Safe	151	
Hex triplet	#169B62	#FFFFFF	#FF883E	
RGB	22–155–98	255–255–255	255–136–62	
CMYK	71–0–72–0	0–0–0–0	0–43–91–0	

According to the guidelines, the flag should normally be displayed on a flagstaff, with the green pale positioned next to the flagstaff, at the hoist. Provided that the correct proportions are observed, the flag may be made to any convenient size.

=== Symbolism ===
The green pale of the flag symbolises Roman Catholics and the orange represents the minority Protestants who were supporters of William of Orange. His title came from the Principality of Orange, but his power came from his leadership as Stadtholder of the Netherlands, a Protestant bastion from the 16th century. The white in the centre signifies a lasting peace and hope for union between Protestants and Catholics in Ireland. The flag, as a whole, is intended to symbolise the inclusion and hoped-for union of the people of different traditions on the island of Ireland, which is expressed in the Constitution as the entitlement of every person born in Ireland to be part of the independent Irish nation, regardless of ethnic origin, religion or political conviction. (Green was also used as the colour of such Irish bodies as the mainly-Protestant and non-sectarian Friendly Brothers of St. Patrick, established in 1751.)

Occasionally, differing shades of yellow or gold, instead of orange, are seen at civilian functions. However, the Department of the Taoiseach stated that this is a misrepresentation that "should be actively discouraged" and that worn-out flags should be replaced. In songs and poems, the colours are sometimes enumerated as "green, white and gold" by using poetic licence. Variants of different guises are utilised to include, for example, various emblems of Ireland, such as the presidential harp, the four provinces or county arms.

== History ==
=== Background symbolism ===
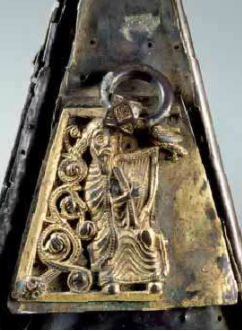
Representation of an Irish harp, c.1100 AD, on a reliquary shrine of St. Máedóc, County Wexford

Green has been associated with the Irish for hundreds of years. An anecdote in the Lebor Gabála tells how Gaidel Glas, son of Nel (or Niul), father of the Irish people, was cured of a snakebite when Moses made fervent prayer and placed his staff on Gaidel's wound. An inserted verse in an earlier passage says of Gaidel: "green were his arms and his vesture". Michael O'Clery's redaction of the Lebor Gabála adds that the snakebite left a green ring on Gaidel from which he earned his nickname 'Glas' ("the green").

The colour green is frequently eulogised in Gaelic Irish Annals, with the emergence of green pastures or 'cloverly plains' deemed a desirable outcome. It is postulated this inspired a widespread adoption in Ireland that commenced from the late 16th century.

Use of the harp on green flag played a role in this adoption, the instrument having appeared on Irish manuscripts and stone crosses since at least the 8th century making it a characteristic instrument of Ireland. The presidential flag of Ireland today includes a representation of the 14th century "Brian Boru Harp". Both the 13th century Wijnbergen Roll and the late 15th-century painting of arms, the Rous Roll, feature a harp as a representation of Ireland.

=== Green and Orange representation ===
A green flag featuring a harp is described as being used by Eoghan Ruadh Ó Néill in 1642.

The green harp flag, first used by Eoghan Ruadh Ó Néill in 1642

The colour green became further associated with Ireland from the 1640s, when the green harp flag was used by the Irish Catholic Confederation. Likewise Green ribbons have been worn on St Patrick's Day since at least the 1680s. Suggesting that green was already a national colour at this time, The Friendly Brothers of St Patrick, an Irish nationalistic fraternity founded in about 1750 adopted green as its colour. In the late 18th century, green was used by the United Irishmen, reinvigorating its nationalist links. The United Irishmen, founded in the 1790s, were inspired by the French revolution, and used a green flag, to which they had a harp emblazoned. A rival organisation, the Orange Order, whose main strength was in Ulster, and which was exclusively for Protestants, especially members of the established Church of Ireland, was founded in 1795 in memory of King William of Orange and the Glorious Revolution of 1688. Following the Irish Rebellion of 1798, which pitted the "green" tradition of the republican United Irishmen against the "orange" tradition of the Protestant Ascendancy loyal to the British Crown, the ideal of a later nationalist generation in the mid-19th century was to make peace between the two traditions and, if possible, to found a self-governing Ireland on such peace and union, as exemplified by the Young Ireland movement and its calls for a National Council of 300 while promoting Catholic-Protestant unity. The first green-orange devices and subsequent Irish Tricolours were a physical manifestation of this thinking.

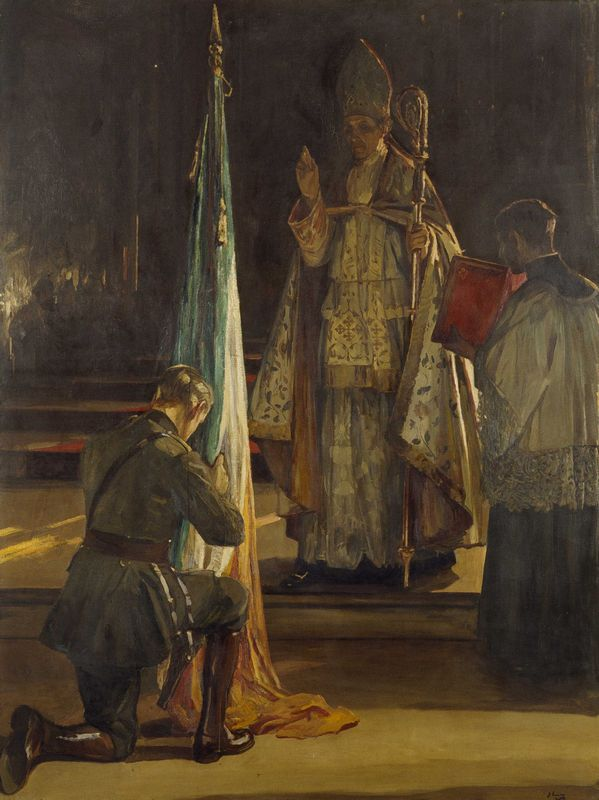
Blessing of the Colours by John Lavery

== The Tricolour emerges ==
The colours were first fused in a green-orange device in March 1830, following the frequent calls of Daniel O'Connell for 'orange and green to unite'. It appeared at a political rally in Cork City and was complimented for its peaceful message of unity by a speaker. This occurred in the wake of Catholic Emancipation, Ireland lifted on a goodwill tide. A first tricolour of green, white and orange arrived in September 1830 when a tricolour cockade were presented at a meeting held to celebrate the French Revolution of that year – a revolution which restored the use of the French tricolour.

The three colours were first fused by Emelia Eleanor Hamilton of Annadale Cottage, Fairview, Dublin, daughter of prominent humanitarian, civil servant and author Joseph Hamilton. The presentation got notable press in British and Irish newspapers before the symbol was adopted by the Repeal campaign of Daniel O'Connell in December 1830. It saw frequent use in the early 1830's in flag, banner and ribbon form, also being adopted by the anti-tithe movement and seeing occasional use in Father Matthew's Temperance campaign.

The first recorded flight over a building took place at Dunsoghly Towerhouse, Dublin in July 1832. The Irish tricolour also crossed the Atlantic, being presented to the Chair of a meeting of the 'Friends of Ireland' in Charleston, South Carolina in 1831. The colours saw ongoing if declining use in tricolour and green-orange format, both espousing the same peaceful message, in flag, banner, rosettes and badge format from 1830 - 1847, by the Repeal and Temperance movements.

After the death of Daniel O'Connell, the Young Irelanders adopted the green-orange symbol connected with his Repeal movement for their group, the Irish Confederates. The occasion of the French Revolution in February 1848 incited much celebration, the French flag being flown at Confederate locations in Cork, Cappoquin and Waterford City. The March 7th, 1848 unfurling of a French flag in Waterford would later be mistaken for the first flight of an Irish Tricolour. An Irish Tricolour did fly at Enniscorthy, County Wexford on March 07th in a much publicised event, inspiring further uptake. Within weeks the Young Irelanders began adding white to their existing green-orange device, first seen at a Confederate location in Limerick City on Saint Patrick's Day 1848.

Following the Young Irelanders adoption, the group travelled to France carrying addresses of salutation to the French administration. Receiving none, they returned with a striking example of their adopted symbol, the Irish Tricolour, which was presented at a meeting to welcome the group home in April, 1848. Thomas Francis Meagher's description of the Irish flag at this event explained the symbolism of the colours to a new generation, formalised the white to the centre, and gave the flag an important association, one to the liking of later Irish Republicans: "The white in the centre signifies a lasting truce between the ‘Orange’ and the ‘Green’, and I trust that beneath its folds the hands of the Irish Catholics and Irish Protestants may be clasped in heroic brotherhood." He went on to suggest an alternative design incorporating the Red hand of Ulster: "If this flag be destined to fan the flames of war, let England behold once more, upon the white centre, the Red Hand that struck her down from the hills of Ulster."

John Mitchel, referring to the tricolour of green, white and orange that Meagher presented on behalf of the delegation to France, said: "I hope to see that flag one day waving, as our national banner". These were important endorsements. The first Irish tricolours from 1830 to 1847 were linked to the Repeal, or Home Rule, campaigns of Daniel O'Connell, who did not espouse Republican ideals. The symbols use by the Young Irelanders - Irish Confederates gave the flag a link to Republicanism, paving the way for its use in the Easter Rising 1916 and subsequent choice as the national flag. From April 1848 following the meeting, Irish tricolours appeared side by side with French ones at meetings held all over the country, the Rising failure seeing its use decline.

== Adoption by secret societies ==
The Tricolour was used sparingly between 1848 and 1910, adopted by groups like the Irish Democratic Alliance in 1850 and flown at nationalist events. Its most important adoption was by various Fenian groups, first recorded in America then Ireland. It became the secretive symbol of Clan na Gael in America, while in Ireland it was used by the Irish Republican Brotherhood. Despite this ongoing use, much of it subtle or behind closed doors, up to the eve of the Easter Rising of 1916, the green flag featuring a harp held undisputed sway as the most popular national symbol.

Neither the colours nor the arrangement of the early tricolours were standardised, with some invention and variation evident. In 1850 a flag of green for the Roman Catholics, orange for the Protestants of the Established Church and blue for the Presbyterians was adopted by the Tenant League. In 1883, a Parnellite tricolour of yellow, white and green, arranged horizontally, was recorded. Down to modern times, yellow or gold has occasionally been used instead of orange, but by this substitution the fundamental symbolism is destroyed.

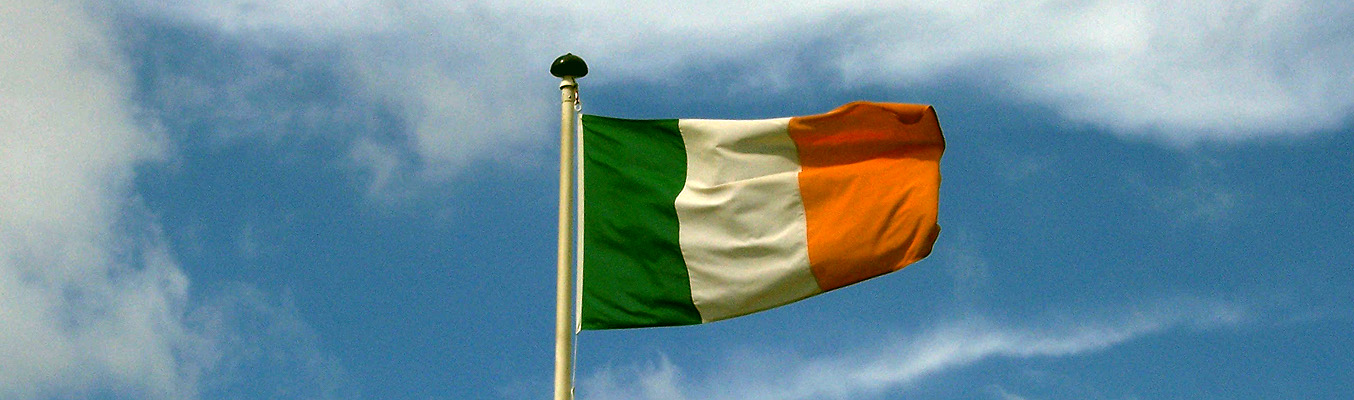
The Irish flag is always flown with the green at the hoist.

Associated with the national independence movement, the flag was flown during the Easter Rising of 1916, capturing the national imagination as the banner of the new revolutionary Ireland. The flag flew over more locations during the Rising than any other flag, having been adopted in advance as the symbol of the Rising by the Irish Republican Brotherhood. Other flags flown, like the Irish Republic flag, were considered 'banners'. The Green Harp flag flew also, Michael Staines explaining it was used as many Irish men still considered this the national symbol, particularly those who had not been sworn into the I.R.B.

After the Rising the flag saw a rapid ascension to the most popular symbol of Ireland, being adopted by the Executive Council without contest for the Irish Free State, which existed between 1922 and 1937. The Free State constitution did not specify national symbols; the decision to use the flag was made without recourse to statute. When the Free State joined the League of Nations in September 1923, the new flag "created a good deal of interest amongst the general public" in Geneva. The defeated republicans who had fought the Free State's forces in the 1922–23 Civil War regarded the tricolour as the flag of the self-proclaimed Irish Republic, and condemned its appropriation by the new state, as expressed in the song "Take It Down From The Mast". They differentiated their Tricolour by putting the words I.R for Irish Republic on the white field. The Executive Council's decision was a provisional one. A 1928 British document said:

The government in Ireland have taken over the so called Free State Flag in order to forestall its use by republican element and avoid legislative regulation, to leave them free to adopt a more suitable emblem later.

In 1937, the tricolour's position as the national flag was formally confirmed by the new Constitution of Ireland.

=== Marine ===
The Red Ensign, used by some Irish merchant vessels until 1939

The pre-independence Merchant Shipping Act 1894 (57 & 58 Vict. c. 60) was not repealed, and so the Free State's mercantile marine was technically required to fly the Red Ensign. The collier Glenageary may have been the first ship to arrive in a British port flying the tricolour on 8 December 1921, two days after the Anglo-Irish Treaty was signed. Their ensign, along with a model of Glenageary, is currently on display in the National Maritime Museum of Ireland. While some ships such as the cross-channel ferries flew the Red Ensign, others sailed under the tricolour. Some masters of Irish ships were charged by HM Customs and Excise and fined by Admiralty courts for flying an "improper ensign". The tricolour was flown by the fisheries patrol vessel Muirchú, precursor to the Irish Naval Service; Frank Carney alleged in the Dáil in 1930 that a trespassing French trawler had refused to surrender to because it did not recognise Muirchú's flag.

Irish-register ships could fly the Red Ensign until September 1939, after the outbreak of World War II, when a decree under the state of emergency was made, to ensure neutral Irish ships were not mistaken for British ships. Some ships flying the tricolour were nevertheless sunk by Germans. When the tricolour was hoisted over the passenger ferries in Holyhead their British crews went on strike. Five days later their owners transferred the ferries to the British register and the Red Ensign was restored. On the other hand, the Belfast to Liverpool ferry, British owned and British crewed, used the tricolour as a flag of convenience; so did the whalers of Christian Salvesen Shipping, to take advantage of the Irish whale quota.

The tricolour's marine status was formalised by the Merchant Shipping Act 1947.

=== Use in Northern Ireland ===
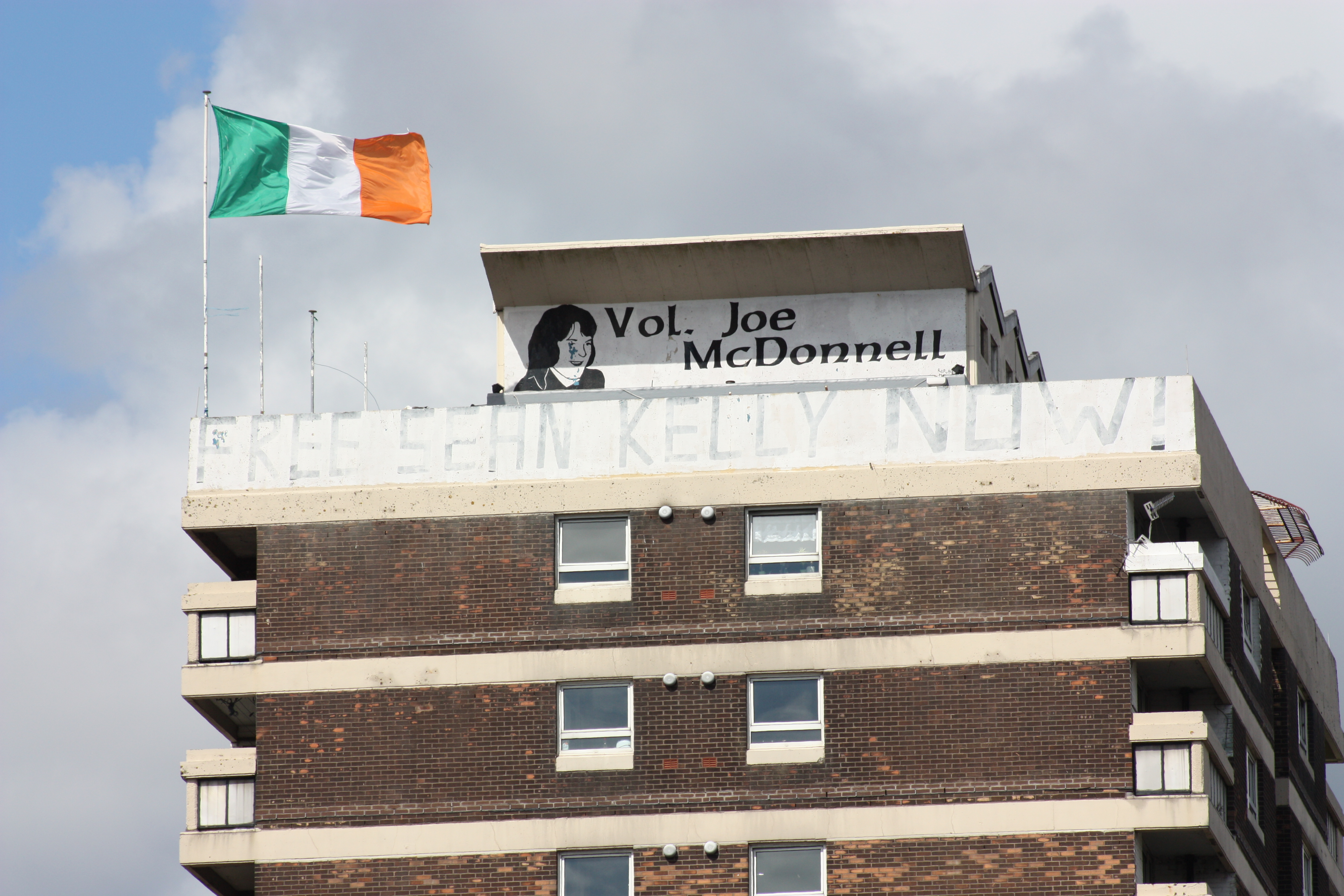
A large tricolour flying from Cuchulainn House in the New Lodge, Belfast

In 1921, Ireland was partitioned, with the unionist-dominated north-east becoming Northern Ireland, while later, in 1922, the remainder of Ireland left the United Kingdom of Great Britain and Ireland to form the Irish Free State. Northern Ireland continued to use the UK's Union Flag and created its Ulster Banner derivation of the flag of Ulster with a crown on top of a six-pointed star. Furthermore, for many years the tricolour was effectively banned in Northern Ireland under the Flags and Emblems (Display) Act (Northern Ireland) 1954 which empowered the police to remove any flag that could cause a breach of the peace but specified, rather controversially, that a Union Flag could never have such an effect. In 1964, the enforcement of this law by the Royal Ulster Constabulary at the behest of Ian Paisley, involving the removal of a single tricolour from the offices of Sinn Féin in Belfast, led to two days of rioting. The tricolour was immediately replaced, highlighting the difficulty of enforcing the law.

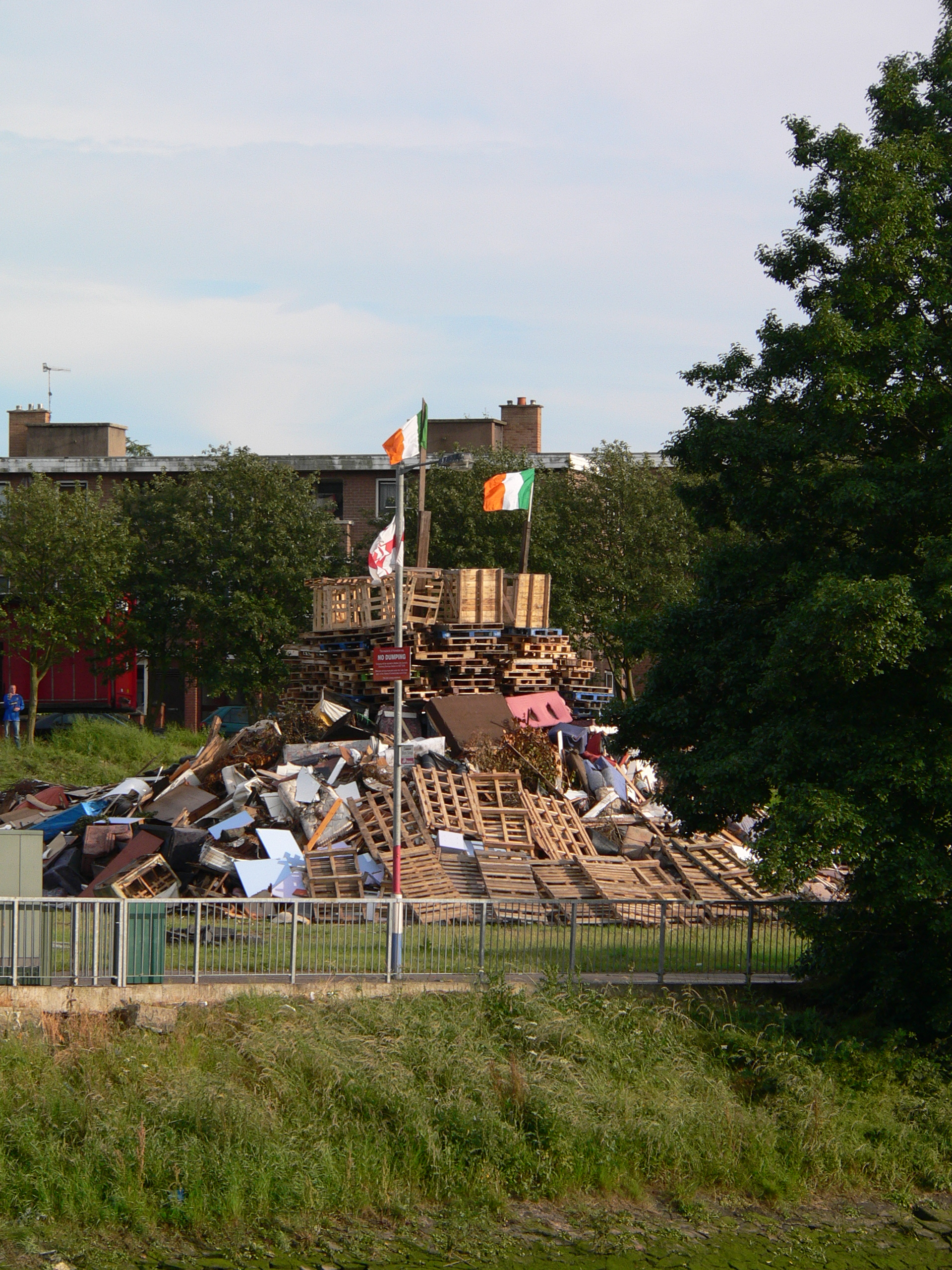
Tricolours have been burned on Loyalist bonfires during twelfth of July celebrations.

Despite its original symbolism, in Northern Ireland the tricolour, along with most other markers of either British or Irish identity, has come to be a symbol of division. The Ulster Unionist Party Government of Northern Ireland adopted the Ulster Banner (based on the flag of Ulster) in 1953. Thus it is this flag and the Union Flag that are flown by unionists and loyalists, while the tricolour is flown by nationalists and republicans. In Northern Ireland, each community uses its own flags, murals and other symbols to declare its allegiance and mark its territory, often in a manner that is deliberately provocative. Kerb-stones in unionist and loyalist areas are often painted red, white and blue, while in nationalist and republican areas kerb-stones may be painted green, white and orange, although this is a much less frequent occurrence. Elements of both communities fly "their" flag from chimneys, tall buildings and lamp-posts on roads.

Under the 1998 Good Friday or Belfast Agreement, it was recognised that flags continue to be a source of disagreement in Northern Ireland. The Agreement stated that:

All participants acknowledge the sensitivity of the use of symbols and emblems for public purposes, and the need in particular in creating the new institutions to ensure that such symbols and emblems are used in a manner which promotes mutual respect rather than division.

Unionists argue that the recognition of the principle of consent in the Agreement – that Northern Ireland's constitutional status cannot change without a majority favouring it – by the signatories amounts to recognising that the Union Flag is the only legitimate official flag in Northern Ireland. Nationalists maintain that the Agreement means that the use of the Union Flag for official purposes should be restricted, or that the tricolour should be flown alongside the UK's flag on government buildings. However the tricolour is never flown from official buildings, alone or alongside the UK's flag. A Sinn Féin Lord Mayor of Belfast, Alex Maskey, displayed both flags in his own offices causing some controversy.

Some institutions in Great Britain, such as the BBC, have previously and mistakenly used the tricolour to represent Northern Ireland.

== Protocol ==
The Department of the Taoiseach has issued guidelines to assist persons in giving due respect to the national flag. Observance of the guidelines is a matter for each individual as there are no statutory requirements. It is expected, however, that the national flag will be treated at all times with appropriate respect by those who use it. The department has general responsibility in relation to the national flag and this is primarily concerned with the protocol for the flying of the flag. The Department's role, therefore, is an advisory one.

With respect to the display, placing and precedence of the national flag by both itself and in relation to other flags, the department has made a number of suggestions. No flag or pennant should be flown above the national flag. When the flag is carried with another flag, or flags, it should be carried in the place of honour – that is on the marching right, or on the left of an observer towards whom the flags are approaching. Where one of these flags is that of the European Union, the European Union flag should be carried on the immediate left of the national flag, or, as seen by an observer when the flags are approaching, on the immediate right of the national flag. In the event of a display of crossed staffs, the national flag should be to the right and to the fore – that is to the left of the observer who is facing the flag. Its staff should be in front of the other flag or flags.

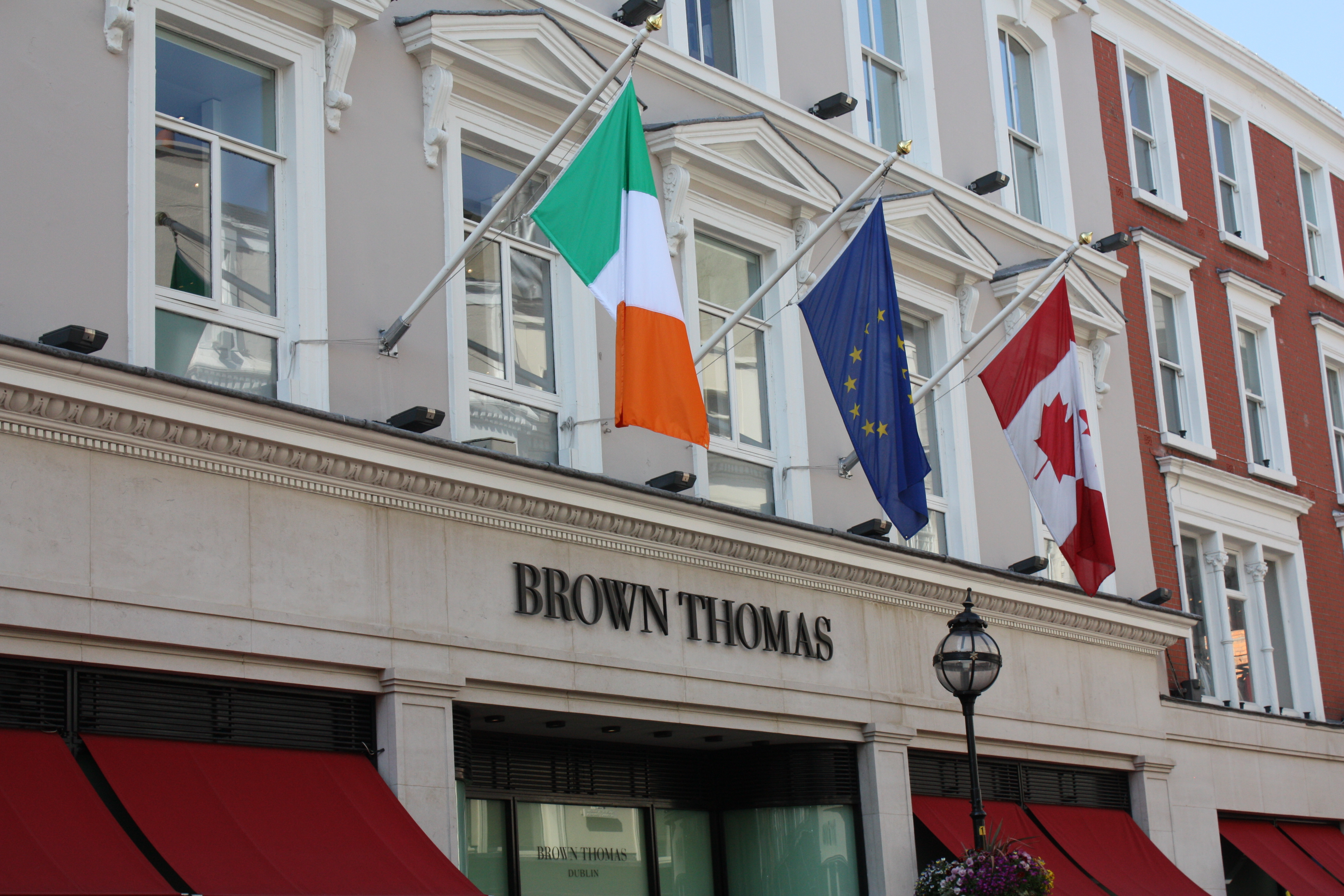
Flag flown in the place of honour to the left, accompanied to the right by the flags of the European Union and Canada

When the group of flags of the European Union are flown, the sequence is alphabetical, based on the first letter of the country's name. The flags should be flown from left to right with the European Union flag flown from the first flagstaff before the group. An alternative order of flags is to begin on the left with the national flag and place the European Union flag on the far right of the group, as seen by an observer. With regard to international flags; where either an even or an odd number of flags are flown in line on staffs of equal height, the national flag should be first on the right of the line – that is on the observer's left while facing the flags. Where one of these flags is that of the European Union, the European Union flag should be flown on the immediate left of the national flag, or as seen by an observer, on the immediate right of the national flag. Where, however, an odd number of flags are displayed from staffs grouped so that there is one staff in the centre and higher than the others, the national flag should be displayed from the staff so placed. Where one of these flags is that of the European Union, the European Union flag should be flown from the first flagstaff on the right, or as seen by an observer, on the first flagstaff on the left. Only one national flag should be displayed in each group of flags or at each location. In all cases, the national flag should be in the place of honour. When the national flag is displayed either horizontally or vertically against a wall or other background, the green should be on the right (an observer's left) in the horizontal position or uppermost in the vertical position. When displayed on a platform, the national flag should be above and behind the speaker's desk. While being carried, the flag should not be dipped by way of salute or compliment except to the dead during memorial ceremonies.

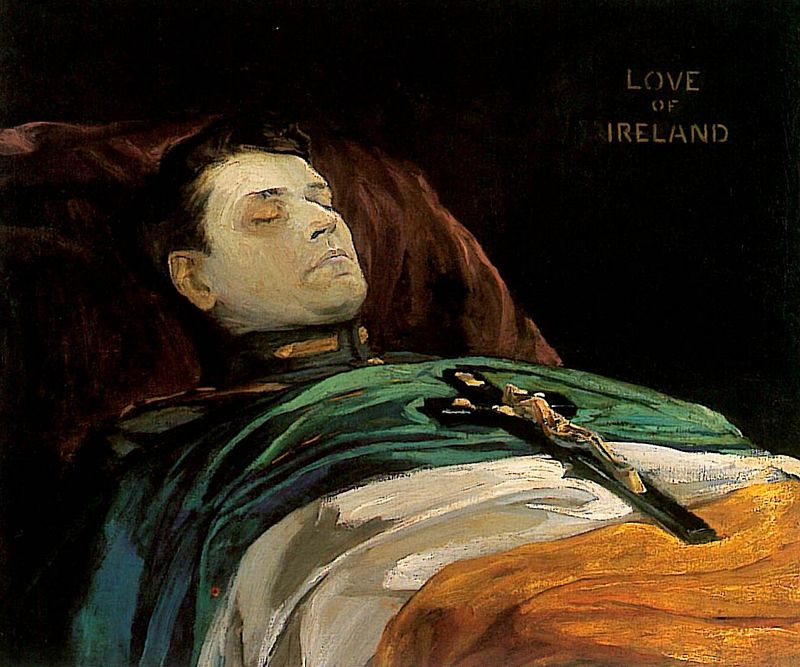
Michael Collins lying in state by John Lavery showing the green of the flag towards the head

In raising or lowering, the national flag should not be allowed to touch the ground. When being hoisted to half-mast, the flag should first be brought to the peak of the staff and then lowered to the half-mast position. It should again be brought to the peak of the staff before it is finally lowered. On ceremonial occasions when the national flag is being hoisted or lowered, or when it is passing by in a parade, all present should face it, stand to attention and salute. Persons in uniform who normally salute with the hand should give the hand salute. Persons in civilian attire should salute by standing to attention. The salute to the flag when it is being borne past in a parade is rendered when the flag is six paces away and the salute is held until the flag has passed by. Where more than one national flag is carried, the salute should be given only to the leading flag. When the national anthem is played in the presence of the national flag, all present should face the national flag, stand to attention and salute it, remaining at the salute until the last note of the music.

When the national flag has become worn or frayed it is no longer fit for display, and should not be used in any manner implying disrespect. The national flag, when used as a decoration, should always be treated with due respect. It may be used as a discreet lapel button or rosette or as part of a centrepiece for a table. When used in the latter context with the flags of other nations, the national flag should also be displayed in the place of honour on a nearby flag staff. Where multiple national flags are flown on festive occasions these should be of uniform dimensions. Bunting of the national colours may also be used on festive occasions.

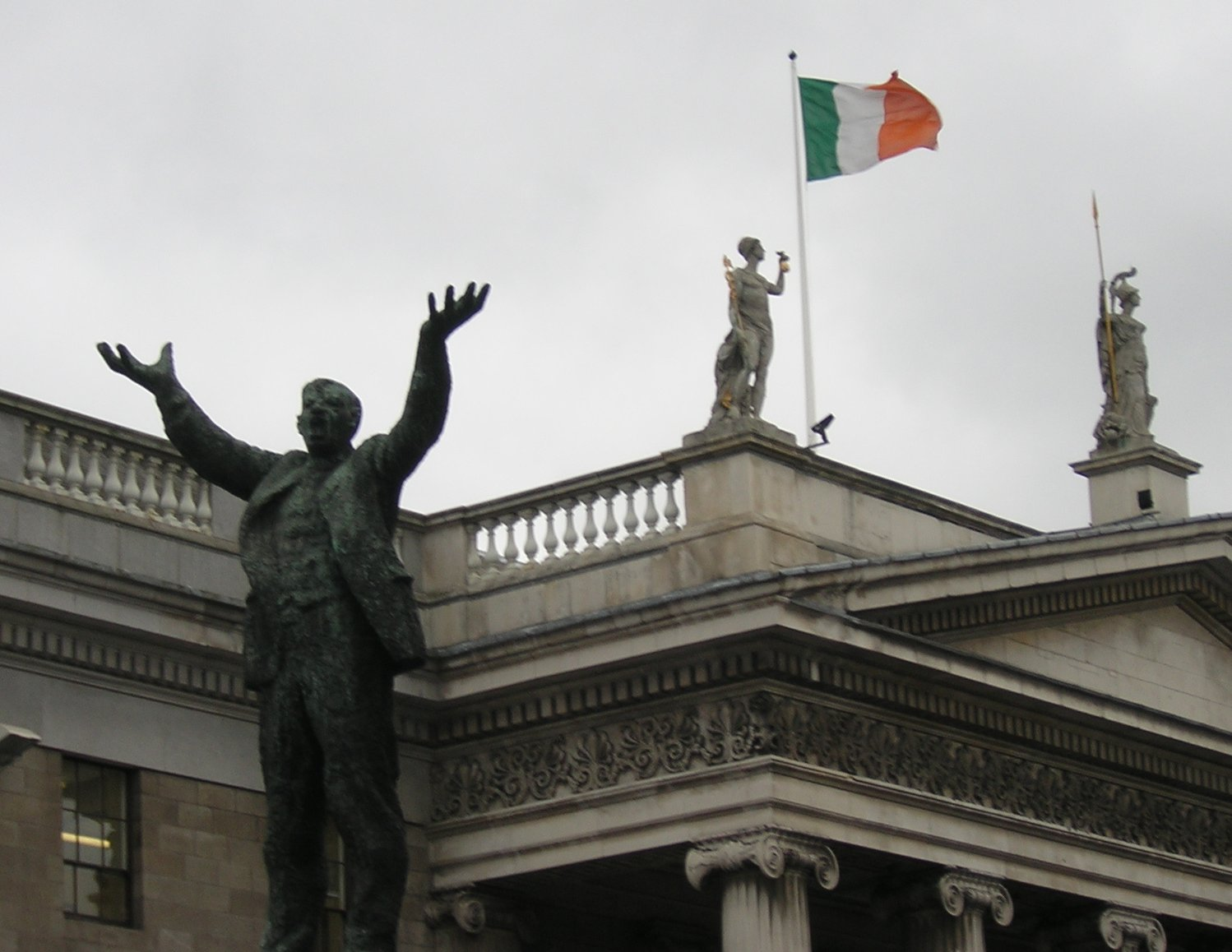
The Irish flag flying from the General Post Office in Dublin

The national flag should be displayed in the open only between sunrise and sunset, except on the occasion of public meetings, processions, or funerals, when it may be displayed for the duration of such functions. When displayed on a platform, the national flag should not be used to cover the speaker's desk, nor should it be draped over the platform. The national flag should never be defaced by placing slogans, logos, lettering or pictures of any kind on it, for example at sporting events. The flag should not be draped on cars, trains, boats or other modes of transport; it should not be carried flat, but should always be carried aloft and free, except when used to drape a coffin; on such an occasion, the green should be at the head of the coffin. The tricolour is draped across the coffins of Presidents of Ireland (including former presidents), soldiers and Garda Síochána personnel killed in the line of duty, and other notables accorded state funerals, such as Roger Casement in 1965, or Kevin Barry in 2001. Care should be taken at all times to ensure that the national flag does not touch the ground, trail in water or become entangled in trees or other obstacles. It is the normal practice to fly the national flag daily at all military posts and from a limited number of important State buildings. The European flag is flown alongside the national flag on all official buildings, and in most places where the Irish flag is flown over buildings. The national flag is flown over buildings including: the residence of the President of Ireland, Áras an Uachtaráin; Leinster House, the seat of the Irish parliament, when parliament is in session; Irish courts and state buildings; Irish military installations, at home and abroad; Irish embassies and consulates; and Garda Síochána (police) stations. The national flag is also flown on Saint Patrick's Day (the national holiday), Easter Sunday and Easter Monday (in commemoration of the Easter Rising of 1916), and the National Day of Commemoration on the Sunday closest to 11 July. On these occasions the national flag is flown from all State buildings throughout the country which are equipped with flagpoles, and many private individuals and concerns also fly it. The national flag is flown on the occasion of other significant national and local events such as festivals and commemorations. The national flag is frequently flown at half-mast on the death of a national or international figure on all prominent government buildings equipped with a flag pole. The death of a prominent local figure may be marked locally by the national flag being flown at half-mast. Where the national flag is flown at half-mast no other flag should be half-masted.

== Similarity to the flag of the Ivory Coast ==
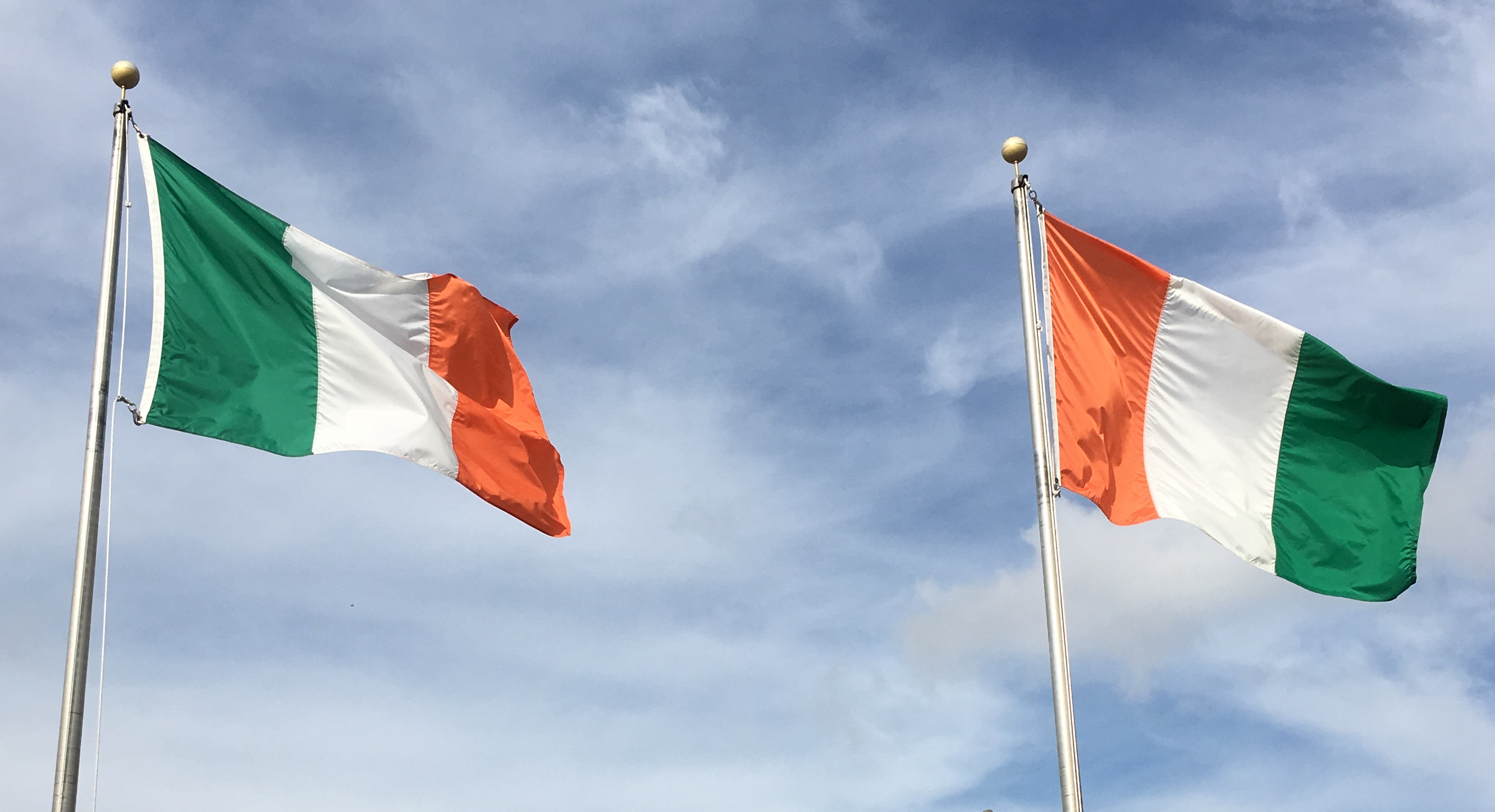
Contrasting flags: the Irish flag on the left and Ivory Coast flag on the right

The flag of the Ivory Coast has a similar colour layout to the Irish one, but with the orange on the hoist side and a shorter proportion (2:3 instead of 1:2). When the Ivory Coast athlete, Murielle Ahouré, celebrated winning the 2018 world indoor 60-metre dash in Birmingham, she borrowed an Irish flag from a spectator and reversed it. Due to this similarity, in Northern Ireland, Ulster loyalists have sometimes desecrated the Ivorian flag, mistaking it for the Irish one. In 2014, Linfield F.C.'s shop on the predominantly-loyalist Shankill Road attracted media coverage, after a window display marking the World Cup included a sign clarifying that one of the flags on display was an Ivory Coast flag, not an Irish one. A Dublin pub also mistakenly flew the Ivorian flag in 2016.

== See also ==
- Coat of arms of Ireland
- Cross-border flag for Ireland
- List of flags of Ireland
- Flag of Northern Ireland
