= Great Seal of Northern Ireland =

National seal of Northern Ireland

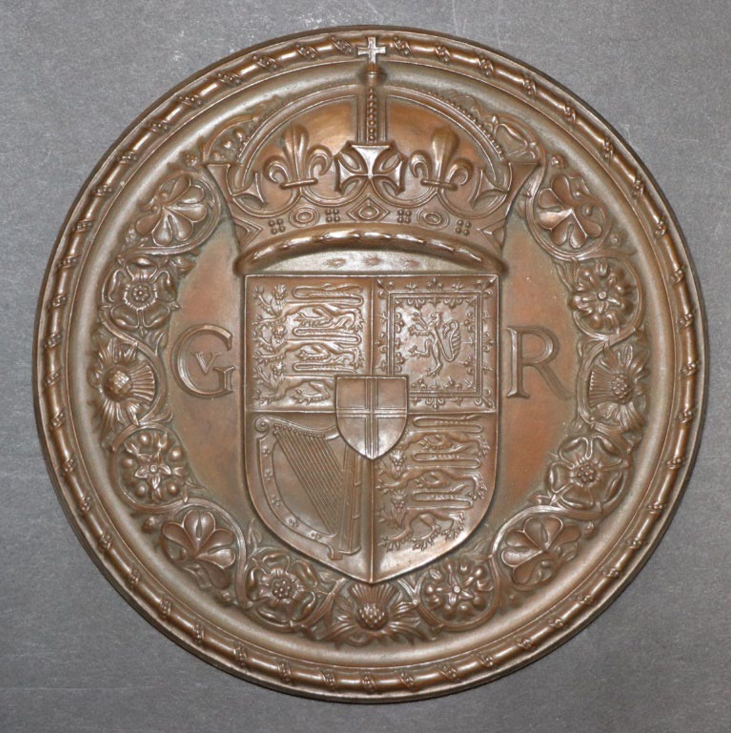
Reverse side of the Great Seal of Northern Ireland struck during the reign on George V in 1924. The current version lacks the royal cypher.

Inescutcheon used on the Royal arms of the United Kingdom on the reverse side of the Great seal for Northern Ireland

The Great Seal of Northern Ireland is the seal used for Northern Ireland. The great seal is in the possession of the Secretary of State for Northern Ireland. The Great Seal was created by the Irish Free State (Consequential Provisions) Act 1922 on the creation of Northern Ireland for possession by the Governor of Northern Ireland to "be used for all matters in Northern Ireland for which the Great Seal of Ireland was theretofore used".

This remained until the imposition of direct rule in 1972, followed by the abolition of the post of Governor in 1973, when it was presented to the Secretary of State for Northern Ireland.

== Design ==
=== Seal of George V ===
The first Great Seal of Northern Ireland was provided in time for the state opening of the 1924 session of the Northern Ireland Parliament. Prior to this, the Governor of Northern Ireland (James Hamilton, 3rd Duke of Abercorn) used his private seal instead, as permitted by the 1922 act. The first seal was designed by Nevile Wilkinson, the Ulster King of Arms. The reverse was based on the Great Seal of the Realm but with the royal coat of arms bearing an inescutcheon with a red cross on a gold field, the basis of the historical coat of arms of Ulster and the sinister banner on the coat of arms of Northern Ireland, also designed by Wilkinson. The design on the reverse of George VI's seal had his royal cypher in Latin: GVR flanking the shield of arms. The 1924 seal had an image of the reigning monarch, George V. In 1985 the 1924 great seal was acquired by the National Heritage Memorial Fund for the Ulster Museum.

=== Seal of George VI ===
The British practice is to strike a new seal for a new monarch, but Edward VIII abdicated before his Northern Ireland seal had been struck, and the 1924 seal was not replaced until 1938 with one for George VI. The design on the reverse of George VI's seal had his royal cypher in Latin: GVIR flanking the shield of arms.

=== Seal of Elizabeth II ===
The new seal for Elizabeth II was delivered to the Governor, John Loder, 2nd Baron Wakehurst, on 5 November 1953 at a meeting of Privy Council of Northern Ireland, whereupon the obsolete seal of her father George VI was ceremonially defaced with a hammer by the Clerk of the Council and gifted to the Governor.

The design on the obverse of Elizabeth II's seal is the same as on the obverse of her Great Seal of the Realm, with an equestrian portrait of the queen in the uniform of the Grenadier Guards, the royal cypher in Latin: EIIR beneath a St Edward's Crown below the horse, and the circumscription in Latin: elizabeth · ii · d·g· britt· regnorvmqve · svorvm · ceter· regina · consortionis · popvlorvm · princeps · f·d·, lit. 'Elizabeth the Second, by the Grace of God, of the Britains and of her other realms Queen, Head of the Commonwealth, Defender of the Faith'.

The design on the reverse has a shield of arms emblazoned with the royal arms of the United Kingdom as used in Northern Ireland (with its inescutcheon of the arms of Ulster) surmounted by a Tudor Crown. The crowned shield is wreathed by a floral pattern including the Irish shamrock, the English and Welsh Tudor rose, and the Scottish thistle. The reverse lacks the royal cypher.

=== Seal of Charles III ===
Under the authority of an Order in Council made on 10 September 2022, following the death of Queen Elizabeth II, the existing Great Seal of Northern Ireland continues to be used until another seal is prepared and authorised by King Charles III.

== Uses ==
Letters patent by the monarch under the Great Seal of Northern Ireland are used for the following:

- Senior judicial appointments to the courts of Northern Ireland, including the Lord Chief Justice, Lords Justice of Appeal, and High Court judges.
- Royal assent to bills of the Northern Ireland Assembly.

All justices of the peace for Northern Ireland are appointed under a single commission of the peace; the commission was issued under the Great Seal of Northern Ireland, whereas the instrument appointing a justice is issued by the Department of Justice without the seal.

=== Wafer seals ===
The Northern Ireland (Miscellaneous Provisions) Act 1945 authorised the preparation and use of a die bearing the same device as the obverse of the seal, and the impression embossed by means of the die on, or on a wafer or other material attached to, a document confers on the document the same validity in all respects as if it had been authenticated by, or passed under, the Great Seal itself. Section 49 of the Northern Ireland Act 1998 makes similar provision for the creation of wafer versions of the Great Seal of Northern Ireland, which is valid for use on letters patent signifying royal assent to bills of the Northern Ireland Assembly. The wafer seals are used by the First Minister and Deputy-First Minister acting jointly.

== List of Keepers of the Great Seal of Northern Ireland ==
The following are Keepers of the Great Seal, who served as Governor of Northern Ireland (1922–1973):

- 1922 James Hamilton, 3rd Duke of Abercorn
- 1945 William Leveson-Gower, 4th Earl Granville
- 1952 John Loder, 2nd Baron Wakehurst
- 1964 John Erskine, 1st Baron Erskine of Rerrick
- 1968 Ralph Grey, Baron Grey of Naunton

The following are Keepers of the Great Seal, who served as Secretary of State for Northern Ireland (1973–present):

- 1973: William Whitelaw
- 1973: Francis Pym
- 1974: Merlyn Rees
- 1976: Roy Mason
- 1979: Humphrey Atkins
- 1981: Jim Prior
- 1984: Douglas Hurd
- 1985: Tom King
- 1989: Peter Brooke
- 1992: Sir Patrick Mayhew
- 1997: Mo Mowlam
- 1999: Peter Mandelson
- 2001: John Reid
- 2002: Paul Murphy
- 2005: Peter Hain also Welsh Secretary
- 2007: Shaun Woodward
- 2010: Owen Paterson
- 2012: Theresa Villiers
- 2016: James Brokenshire
- 2018: Karen Bradley
- 2019: Julian Smith
- 2020: Brandon Lewis
- 2022: Shailesh Vara
- 2022: Chris Heaton-Harris
- 2024: Hilary Benn

== See also ==
- Great Seal of the Irish Free State
- Great Seal of the Realm
- Coat of arms of Northern Ireland
