= Irish Free State (Consequential Provisions) Act 1922 =

Act of the Parliament of the United Kingdom

Irish Free State (Consequential Provisions) Act 1922 (Session 2) (Note: This is the act's short title as given in section 8, although the words "(Session 2)" in the title are often omitted when referring to it.)
- Act of Parliament
- Parliament of the United Kingdom
- Long title: An Act to make such provisions as are consequential on or incidental to the establishment of the Irish Free State.
- Citation: 13 Geo. 5 Sess. 2. c. 2
- Introduced by: Bonar Law (Commons); 9th Duke of Devonshire (Lords)
- Territorial extent: United Kingdom

Dates
- Royal assent: 5 December 1922
- Commencement: 5 December 1922 (Note: The Acts of Parliament (Commencement) Act 1793.)
- Repealed: Republic of Ireland: 8 May 2007
Other legislation
Amends	Jews Relief Act 1858; Government of Ireland Act 1920
Amended by	Statute Law Revision Act 1950; Customs and Excise Act 1952; Statute Law Revision Act 1953; Pensions (Increase) Act 1971; Statute Law (Repeals) Act 1975; Judicature (Northern Ireland) Act 1978; Interpretation Act 1978; Irish Sailors and Soldiers Land Trust Act 1987; Statute Law (Repeals) Act 1989
Repealed by	Republic of Ireland: Statute Law Revision Act 2007
Relates to	Irish Free State Constitution Act 1922

Status: Amended

Status
- Republic of Ireland: Repealed
- Northern Ireland: Amended

History of passage through Parliament

Text of statute as originally enacted

Revised text of statute as amended

Text of the Irish Free State (Consequential Provisions) Act 1922 as in force today (including any amendments) within the United Kingdom, from legislation.gov.uk.

The Irish Free State (Consequential Provisions) Act 1922 (Session 2) (13 Geo. 5 Sess. 2. c. 2) is an act of the Parliament of the United Kingdom passed on 5 December 1922. The act dealt with a number of matters concerning the Irish Free State, which was established on the day after the act became law; it also modified the Government of Ireland Act 1920 ( 10 & 11 Geo. 5. c. 67) in relation to Northern Ireland.

== Purpose ==
Prime Minister Bonar Law first introduced the legislation as a bill in November 1922. The act's purpose was to deal with a range of consequences arising from the impending creation of the Irish Free State. The act also had to make provisions for Northern Ireland which would be appropriate depending on whether (i) Northern Ireland decided to remain part of the new Free State after its establishment or (ii) chose to opt back into the United Kingdom (as was widely anticipated). In regard to Northern Ireland, The Times recalled that there was "no doubt" that Northern Ireland would opt to rejoin the United Kingdom. The act amended the Government of Ireland Act 1920 ( 10 & 11 Geo. 5. c. 67) in certain respects.

== Changes ==
The act's provisions provided that if Northern Ireland opted out of the Free State:

- a Boundary Commission would be established to determine the land frontier between the Free State and the North;
- there shall be a Governor of Northern Ireland, with a salary of £8,000;
- a Privy Council of Northern Ireland would be established, and there would also be a separate Great Seal;
- if there is to be a Council of Ireland (as contemplated in the Government of Ireland Act 1920) "to bring about harmonious action" between the Parliaments and Governments of the South and North and to provide "for the administration of services which the two Parliaments mutually agree should be administered uniformly throughout the whole of Ireland," it will be necessary for identical Acts to be passed;
- that the contribution from Northern Ireland towards Imperial liabilities and expenditure is to remain at £7,920,000, subject to periodical adjustment by a Joint Exchequer Board;
- the High Court of Appeal for Ireland will cease to exist; and
- that Cases which would have been reserved for the High Court of Appeal for Ireland will, in the North, be heard by the Court of Appeal for Northern Ireland.

The act also:

- abolished the office of the Lord Lieutenant of Ireland which had been an all-Ireland office under the act of 1920 as with the establishment of the Free State, the representative of the king in the Free State was to be styled the Governor-General of the Irish Free State;
- abolished the office of Lord Chancellor of Ireland;
- abolished the Irish Land Commissioners (the Commission was revived by the Irish Free State the following year);
- provided for the establishment of a trust, called the Irish Sailors and Soldiers Land Trust, for 'the purpose of providing in Ireland cottages, with or without plots or-gardens, for the accommodation of men who served in the naval, military, or air forces during the war. The trust will have five members, of whom three will be appointed by a Secretary of State, one by the President of the Free State, and one by the Prime Minister of Northern Ireland. However, before these provisions could take effect the two Irish parliaments had to pass legislation to enable the trust to acquire and hold land;
- gave the Commissioners of Customs and Excise powers, if necessary, to make regulations with reference to the importation and exportation of goods into and from Northern Ireland across the land frontier;
- made provision as to relief from double income-tax;
- made provision for the severance of matters such as the system of national health insurance in Great Britain from that in the Irish Free State would, for example, be made by Order in Council; and
- made provision for the pensions of judges.

== Great Seal of Northern Ireland ==
As noted above, the act was also the instrument that created the Great Seal of Northern Ireland:

There shall be a Great Seal of Northern Ireland which shall be kept by the Governor of Northern Ireland and shall, after the first appointment of such Governor, be used for all matters in Northern Ireland for which the Great Seal of Ireland was theretofore used. Until a Great Seal of Northern Ireland is provided the private seal of the Governor of Northern Ireland may be used as that Great Seal.

== Section 6 ==
Irish Free State (Consequential Adaptation of Enactments) Order 1923
- Statutory Rules and Orders
- Parliament of the United Kingdom
- Citation: SR&O 1923/405

Dates
- Made: 27 March 1923
Other legislation
Made under	Irish Free State (Consequential Provisions) Act 1922 (Session 2)
Amended by	Old Age Pensions Act 1936

Text of statute as originally enacted

The Irish Free State (Consequential Adaptation of Enactments) Order 1923 (SR&O 1923/405) was made under this section.

== Subsequent developments ==
The following provisions were repealed by section 1 of, and the first schedule to, the Statute Law Revision Act 1953 (2 & 3 Eliz. 2. c. 5), which came into force on 18 December 1953.

- Subsection (3) of section 6.
- In the first schedule, in paragraph six, sub-paragraph (4).
