= Coat of arms of Connacht =

Irish provincial symbol

Versions
- The banner of arms, which serves as provincial flag
- Armiger: Connacht
- Shield: Party Per Pale Argent and Azure, in the first an eagle dimidiated and displayed Sable in the second issuant from the partition an arm embowed and vested, the hand holding a sword erect, all Argent

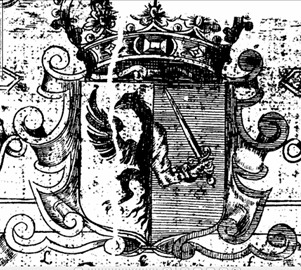
1651 Arms of Connacht

The coat of arms of Connacht displays a vertically dimidiated black eagle and armed hand. The arms are recorded as such on a map of Galway dated 1651, now in the library of Trinity College Dublin. These arms approximate rather closely to those of the Schottenkloster, or Gaelic monastery, founded in Regensburg, Bavaria in the 11th century.

The arms of Connacht is blazoned

Party Per Pale Argent and Azure, in the first an eagle dimidiated and displayed Sable in the second issuant from the partition an arm embowed and vested, the hand holding a sword erect, all Argent

These are believed to have been adopted from the arms of the medieval Schottenkloster (Gaelic monastery) in Regensburg, Germany. These arms, which date from at least the 14th century, combined the arms of the Holy Roman Emperor (from whom the abbey received protection) dimidiated with a symbol that may be linked with the crest of the O'Brien dynasty arms (an 11th-century O'Brien is listed as the "fundator" of the abbey). The arms may have been granted to Ruaidrí Ua Conchobair, King of Connacht and the last High King of Ireland before the Norman invasion, by the abbey as a gift to return his patronage. The arms were given as the "old tyme arms" of Ireland by the Athlone Pursuivant, Edward Fletcher, c. 1575 and, with slight change of tinctures, became the arms of Connacht in the seventeenth century.

== History ==
The question is how the arms of that Schottenkloster located deep in the heart of the Holy Roman Empire come to be associated with the province of Connacht in Ireland. A somewhat unsatisfactory answer to this question can be found in Vatican Ms 11000 which contains a necrology of prominent Irish ecclesiastics and political rulers – with floruits mainly in the twelfth and thirteenth centuries – whose obituaries were recorded locally, apparently on the basis of their being substantial benefactors of the Schottenkloster at Regensburg.

In the section of the aforementioned necrology headed "Kings", the initial entry relates to Donnchadh and Domhnall Mac Carthaigh, rulers of Desmond, to whom the arms of the Schottenkloster were apparently conceded, presumably as arms of affection. If it is assumed that the arms of the Schottenkloster were similarly conceded to the other royal benefactors noted in the necrology, then an explanation of the origins of the arms of the province of Connacht begins to emerge because the final entry in the necrology refers to Ruaidhrí Ó Conchobhair, King of Connacht and last High King of Ireland.

The arms of the vice-admirals of Ireland in the first half of the 17th century appear to consist of the arms of each province with a wing for difference. This implies that the earliest arms of Connacht were Argent an oak tree eradicated vert, similar to the arms of the ruling O'Conor family.

== Present forms and uses ==
The flag of Connacht is usually displayed alongside the flags of Leinster, Munster and Ulster, or as part of the combined flag of the Provinces of Ireland. The flag is the official flag of Connacht Hockey, the Connacht Gaelic Athletic Association and the Connacht rugby team. The eagle and sword arm feature on the Connacht Rugby crest.

Four Provinces Flag of Ireland

Flag of the Irish Rugby Football Union

Flag of Hockey Ireland

House flag of Irish Shipping (1947–1984)
