= Coat of arms of Leinster =

Versions
- The banner of arms, which serves as provincial flag
- Armiger: Leinster
- Shield: Vert, a Harp Or, stringed Argent

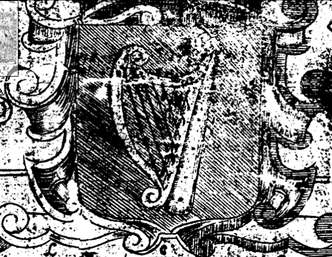
1651 depiction of the arms of Leinster

The flag of the Irish province of Leinster is a banner with the provincial coat of arms: a gold Irish harp with silver strings on a green field (blazon: vert a harp or stringed argent). These arms are similar to the arms of Ireland, which have the same device on a field of blue rather than green.

The arms (Vert, a Harp Or, stringed Argent) is believed to have likely evolved from the arms of Ireland itself with a change of tincture.

== History ==
Possibly the oldest Irish instance of the use of the harp device on a green field was the flag of Eoghan Ruadh Ó Néill (Owen Roe O'Neill). Owen Roe, nephew of Aodh (Hugh O'Neill), had entered the Spanish service after his uncle's defeat at Kinsale in 1601. Owen rose to prominence in the Spanish army, and in 1642 returned to Ireland to assist the Irish Confederation in the war that broke out the previous year. It is recorded that his ship, the St Francis, as she lay at anchor at Dunkirk, flew from her mast top "the Irish harp in a green field, in a flag". Because the confederation's headquarters were located in Kilkenny – the principal city of Leinster "without the pale" – his flag may have had a special significance for that province. The Confederation seal also incorporated, among a number of other motifs, a representation of the Irish harp. When Eoghan Ruadh died in 1649 the hopes of the Irish Confederation died with him.

The early 17th century arms of the vice-admirals of Ireland seem to have incorporated the arms of the respective provinces. Thus, the arms of Leinster were, at least in that period, Azure three crescents, two and one, or.

== Present forms and uses ==
The flag is used by the Leinster GAA and its representative teams. It was formerly used by the Leinster rugby team, which now has a copyrighted design crest incorporating elements of it. The flag or arms are often displayed alongside or combined with those of the other provinces to represent the whole island of Ireland.

Four Provinces Flag of Ireland

Flag of the Irish Rugby Football Union

Flag of Hockey Ireland

House flag of Irish Shipping (1947–1984)

== See also ==
- Coat of arms of Ireland
