= Coat of arms of Northern Ireland =

Coat of arms of the Government of Northern Ireland

Versions
- Achievement

- The banner of arms, which served as the territory's flag ('Ulster banner') 1924–1953
- Armiger: Government of Northern Ireland (dissolved in 1972)
- Adopted: 1924
- Shield: Argent a cross gules, overall on a six pointed star of the field ensigned by an Imperial crown proper a dexter hand couped at the wrist of the second.
- Supporters: Dexter a lion Gules armed langued and collared Or supporting a flagstaff Proper therefrom flowing to the sinister a banner Azure charged with a harp Or stringed Argent surmounted by an imperial crown Proper sinister an Irish elk Proper collared Or supporting a like staff therefrom flowing to the dexter a banner or charged with a cross Gules.
- Compartment: On a grassy mount two flax plants each with three flowers on stems proper.
- Use: The Parliament of Northern Ireland was prorogued in 1972. The arms have not been used officially since then.

The coat of arms of the Government of Northern Ireland were granted to the Executive Committee of the Privy Council of Northern Ireland in 1924. The Government of Northern Ireland was replaced by the Northern Ireland Executive in 1974 and consequently the arms can no longer be used.

== History ==
The coat of arms was designed by Major Sir Nevile Wilkinson, Ulster King of Arms, at Dublin Castle, in 1923. In January 1924, Major Wilkinson held discussions with Northern Irish officials in London regarding the coat of arms. The final design was completed by Wilkinson's deputy, Thomas Ulick Sadleir, for approval by the Northern Irish cabinet in April 1924. The artwork was approved and the Royal Warrant signed by King George V and issued through the Home Office on 2 August 1924 and registered in the Register of Arms in Dublin as follows:

Royal Warrant Government of Northern Ireland

Argent a cross gules, overall on a six pointed star of the field ensigned by an Imperial crown proper a dexter hand couped at the wrist of the second.

Given at our Court of St. James in the 15th year of our reign 2nd August 1924 by His Majesty's command.

The supporters were granted in 1925: a red lion rampant, as on the Royal Banner of Scotland, to represent the Ulster Scots, and an Irish elk to represent the "native element". The lion bears a flag with the Irish harp and the Irish elk bears a flag with the arms of the De Burgh family (described above). The supporters were blazoned as follows:

Dexter a lion gules armed langued and collared or, supporting a flagstaff proper, therefrom flowing to the sinister a banner azure, charged with a harp or, stringed argent, surmounted by an imperial crown proper; Sinister an Irish elk proper, collared or, supporting a like staff, therefrom flowing to the dexter a banner or charged with a cross gules.

In 1971, the College of Arms in London added the compartment on which the supporters stand:

On a grassy mount two flax plants each with three flowers on stems proper.

=== Present status ===
The grant has not been rescinded, but the arms are considered historical, as the body to which the arms were granted no longer exists, and so they cannot be used unless regranted to another armiger. The current Northern Ireland Executive does not use a coat of arms.

The former flag of the Government of Northern Ireland is derived from the arms. The flag is the arms alone (the shield), for supporters are never displayed on a flag. Supporters are not part of the arms – they support the arms, which are on the shield. The formerly official flag continues to be used to represent Northern Ireland at some sports events. Use today can be controversial in some parts of Northern Ireland.

== Symbols currently used in Northern Ireland for official purposes ==
The Northern Ireland Office uses the royal coat of arms of the United Kingdom which also appear on the cover of acts of the Northern Ireland Assembly.

The Northern Ireland Assembly adopted an official emblem in 1998 which depicts six blue flax flowers. The six flowers represent the six historic counties that make up Northern Ireland and the region's history of linen making. The colour is similar to the seats in the assembly chamber at Parliament Buildings, Stormont. This emblem is based on a design created by Leslie Durbin that featured six flax flowers and a coronet which was used to represent Northern Ireland on £1 coins minted in 1991. The Northern Ireland Executive uses a logo depicting a representation of the Giant's Causeway.

The Celtic harp represents Northern Ireland indirectly as Ireland in the royal coat of arms of the United Kingdom. The reverse side of the Great Seal of Northern Ireland features the Royal coat of arms of the United Kingdom bearing an inescutcheon with a red cross on a gold field, the basis of the historical coat of arms of Ulster.

Royal coat of arms of the United Kingdom used by the Northern Ireland Office

Royal coat of arms of the United Kingdom as used on the cover of Act of the Northern Ireland Assembly

Emblem of the Northern Ireland Assembly

Logo of the Northern Ireland Executive

The Celtic harp represents Northern Ireland indirectly as Ireland in the royal coat of arms of the United Kingdom

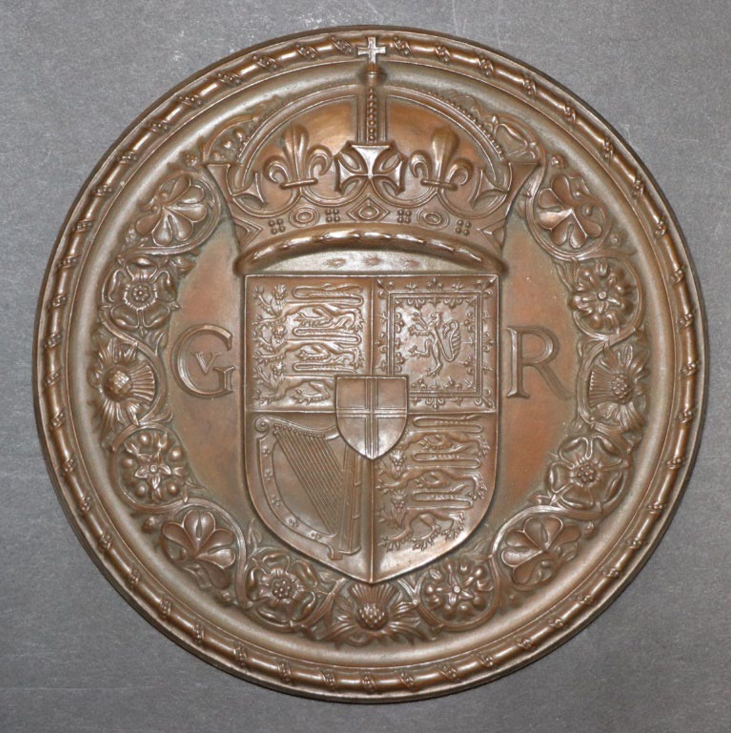
Reverse side of the Great Seal of Northern Ireland struck in 1924

Inescutcheon used on the Royal arms of the United Kingdom on the reverse side of the Great seal for Northern Ireland

== See also ==
- Flag of Northern Ireland
  - Northern Ireland flags issue – Regional dispute
- Great Seal of Northern Ireland – National seal of Northern Ireland
- Ulster – Traditional province in the north of Ireland, includes all of Northern Ireland and part of the Republic of Ireland
  - Coat of arms of Ulster
- Coat of arms of Ireland
