= Ulster Banner =

Heraldic banner

- Ulster Banner
- Use: Small vexillological symbol or pictogram in black and white showing the different uses of the flag
- Proportion: 1∶2
- Adopted: 1924 (Tudor Crown); 1953 (St Edward's Crown)
- Relinquished: 1973 (Government abolished)
- Design: Red cross on a white field, decorated by a six-pointed star bearing a red hand and ensigned by a crown.
- Designed by: Sir Nevile Wilkinson (Ulster King of Arms)
- Use: Version with Tudor Crown used between 1924 and 1953

The Ulster Banner (also unofficially known as the Ulster Flag or Flag of Northern Ireland) is a heraldic banner taken from the former coat of arms of Northern Ireland, consisting of a red cross on a white field, upon which is a crowned six-pointed star with a red hand in the centre. It was the flag of the former Government of Northern Ireland from 1953 until that government was abolished in 1973 with the passing of the Northern Ireland Constitution Act 1973.

== Origin ==
Provincial Flag of Ulster

Arms of the former Government of Northern Ireland, 1924–1973

The arms and flag were said to have been designed in Dublin Castle by Major Sir Nevile Wilkinson, Ulster King of Arms, in 1923–1924. However he spent most of his time travelling abroad so the final version of the flag was designed by his deputy Thomas Sadleir. The flag is based on the flag of the traditional province of Ulster, including a Red Hand of Ulster in the centre, and the red de Burgh cross (though some claim this is the Saint George's Cross). It has the addition of a crown to represent the monarchy of the United Kingdom. Rather than a shield, the Red Hand is inside a six-pointed star, representing the six counties that make up Northern Ireland. It is blazoned: "Argent a cross gules, overall on a six-pointed star of the field ensigned by an Imperial crown proper a Dexter hand couped at the wrist of the second".

The flag is also sometimes called the Ulster flag, the Northern Ireland flag, the (old) Stormont flag, or the Red Hand of Ulster flag. Loyalists often use "Ulster" as another name for Northern Ireland, and Stormont was the seat of the former Government of Northern Ireland.

== History ==
=== Use by the Government of Northern Ireland ===
In 1924, the Government of Northern Ireland was granted its own coat of arms by Royal Warrant and had the right to display these arms on a flag or banner. This right was exercised for the Coronation of Queen Elizabeth II in 1953. From 1953 until 1972 (when the government last sat), the flag was used officially by the Government of Northern Ireland and also as a de facto civic flag for Northern Ireland. In 1973, the Government and Parliament of Northern Ireland were abolished by the Parliament of the United Kingdom under the Northern Ireland Constitution Act 1973.

=== Later use ===
Since the Government of Northern Ireland was abolished in 1973, the flag (and variations thereof) has continued to be used by unionists. In 2004, Belfast City Council commissioned a study on the flying of flags that noted that the Ulster Banner continued to be flown, alongside the Union flag, by three unionist-controlled local authorities in Northern Ireland: Ards Borough Council, Carrickfergus Borough Council, and Castlereagh Borough Council.

== International sport ==
The Ulster Banner is used to represent Northern Ireland at the Commonwealth Games, by FIFA to represent the Northern Ireland national football team, to represent golfers on the PGA Tour, and by darts players representing Northern Ireland.

In November 2024, the Northern Ireland Commonwealth Games Council (NICGC) discussed the possibility of using its own flag at the Commonwealth Games if a new "Civic Flag" proposed by the Commission on Flags, Identity, Culture and Traditions is not in place before the 2026 Commonwealth Games.

Rory McIlroy used the version with the Tudor Crown for his 2025 Masters Tournament win.

== See also ==
- List of flags of Ireland
- List of flags of the United Kingdom
- List of flags used in Northern Ireland
