= Armorial of Ireland =

List of coats of arms of Ireland

This is a list of coats of arms of Ireland. In the majority of cases these are arms assigned to county councils created by the Local Government (Ireland) Act 1898 or later legislation, either by the Chief Herald of Ireland in what is now the Republic of Ireland or by the College of Arms in Northern Ireland. All but two county councils in the Republic have a coat of arms. In Northern Ireland, county councils were abolished in 1973, but the traditional arms are still occasionally used.

The arms of the county town have sometimes been used as an unofficial symbol of a county instead of those of its county council, or when the council had no arms. There are no official county flags. Flags with the GAA county colours serve as de facto county flags. County flags flown at Dublin Castle incorporate the county council arms, while those sold by the GAA county board include the county GAA crest. Coats of arms granted in recent decades often incorporate the GAA colours in the field.

== History ==
The earliest Irish county arms date from the late 17th century, when those of counties Carlow, Kilkenny and "Typerary" were recorded by Richard Carney, Ulster King of Arms. In each case the arms consist of an ermine shield bearing a fesse or central horizontal band on which heraldic devices of local families are displayed. The arms of Tipperary became obsolete when the county was divided into North and South Ridings in 1838.

When county councils were established in 1899, each was obliged to adopt a seal. In some cases these used an unofficial coat of arms, but no arms were officially granted prior to the splitting of heraldic jurisdiction in 1943.

In 1914 a system of county and city flags were designed as unit colours for the Irish Volunteers. Each county flag was to include a coat of arms, with a list of suggested designs drawn by The O'Rahilly. While few of these colours were ever manufactured, some of the county devices were later to occur in official grants.

=== Grants by the Chief Herald of Ireland ===
With the establishment of the Genealogical Office in 1943, a native Irish heraldic jurisdiction was established. One of the earliest grants by the new office was to Dublin County Council on 30 September 1944. The grant was notable for its use of Norse symbolism and the motto in the Irish language. In 1949 Edward MacLysaght, the Chief Herald, discovered the 17th century arms of counties Carlow and Kilkenny, and wrote to the county councils concerned informing them of their existence. From 1956 there was a steady flow of grants to county councils. In 1990 Tipperary South Riding County Council was granted arms based on those recorded by Richard Carney.

=== Grants by the College of Arms ===
In 1943 heraldic jurisdiction in Northern Ireland passed to the College of Arms in London, with the creation of the merged office of Norroy and Ulster King of Arms. Five out of the six county councils received grants of arms from London. In each case supporters were also granted. In all cases these arms became obsolete with the abolition of county councils by the Local Government Act (Northern Ireland) 1972.

== State ==
=== Present ===
==== Republic of Ireland ====
Official arms of the Republic of Ireland 1945–present

==== Northern Ireland ====
Obsolete coat of arms of Northern Ireland

Escutcheon

Royal coat of arms of the United Kingdom

Escutcheon

=== Historical ===
Arms of the Kingdom of Ireland

Arms of the Kingdom of Ireland (with crest)

The heraldic badge of Ireland, created during the Tudor era, is distinguished from the arms of Ireland by being ensigned with a royal crown.

Arms of the Lordship of Ireland

Royal arms of the United Kingdom of Great Britain and Ireland, 1801–1816

Royal arms of the United Kingdom of Great Britain and Ireland, 1816–1837

Royal arms of the United Kingdom of Great Britain and Ireland, 1837–1922

== Provinces ==
=== Present ===
Province	Arms	Blazon	Article
Connacht	Connacht	Party Per Pale Argent and Azure, in the first an eagle dimidiated and displayed Sable in the second issuant from the partition an arm embowed and vested, the hand holding a sword erect, all Argent	Coat of arms of Connacht
Leinster	Leinster	Vert, a Harp Or, stringed Argent	Coat of arms of Leinster
Munster	Munster	Azure, three antique crowns Or	Coat of arms of Munster
Ulster	Ulster	Or, on a Cross Gules, an inescutcheon Argent, charged with a dexter hand erect aupaumee and couped at the wrist Gules	Coat of arms of Ulster

==== Joint symbol ====
Quartered provincial flag, a symbol of all-island Ireland. The placement of the provinces' arms varies.

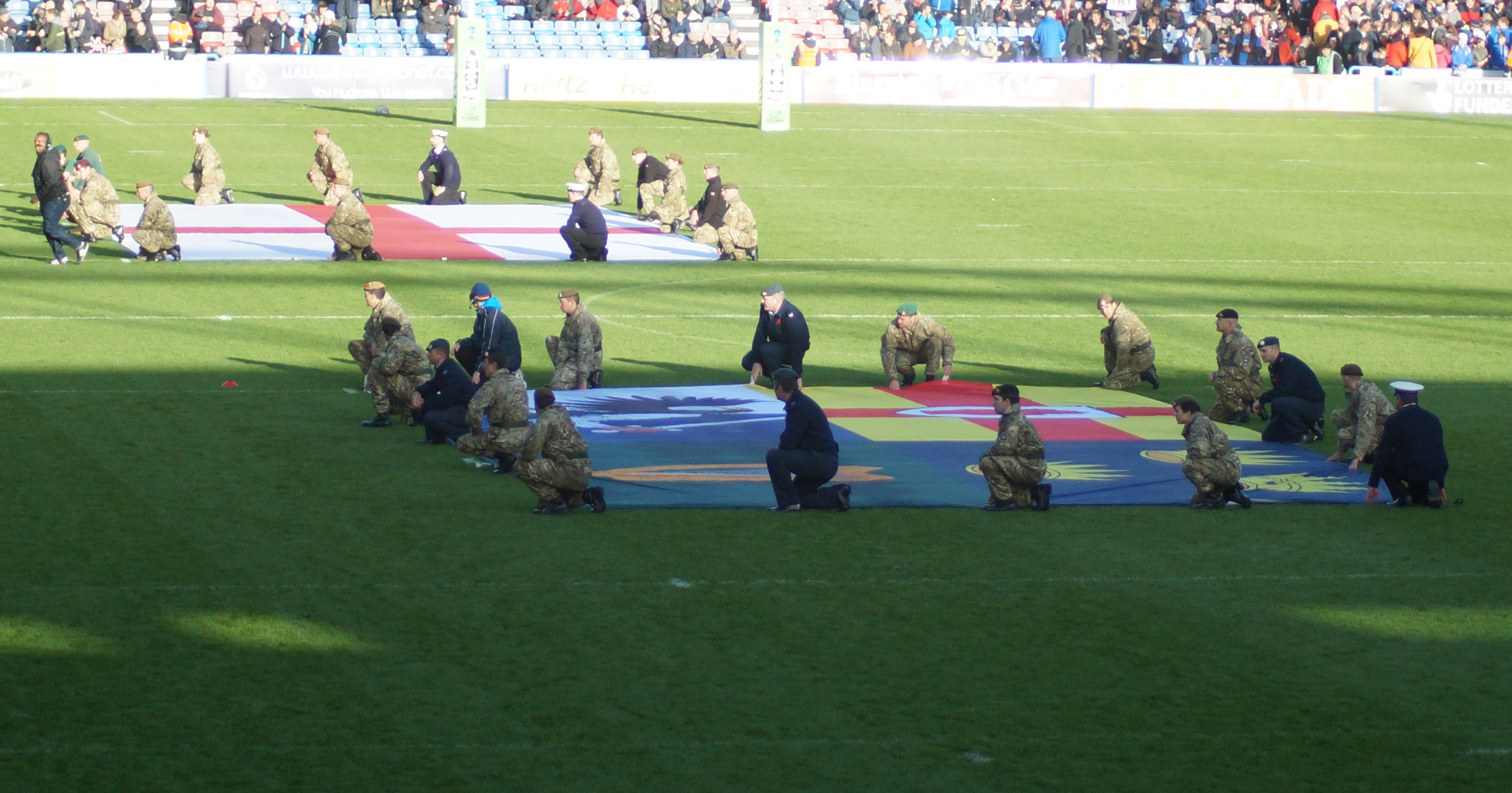
England v Ireland 2013 Rugby League World Cup

The provincial arms are popularly displayed together, quartered as a coat of arms of all-island Ireland. This symbol, as well as the flag equivalent, are used by various all-Ireland sports teams and cultural organisations. The order in which the flags appear varies. The flag and its variations are currently used by many organizations in Ireland, especially those that operate in an all-Ireland context, for example the Ireland rugby league team. Other teams use variations of the flag, including the Irish hockey team, the Irish rugby union team and the Irish Amateur Boxing Association.

The "Four Provinces Flag" as used by the Ireland Rugby League Team

Flag of the Ireland Rugby Union Team

Flag of the Ireland Field Hockey Team

House flag of Irish Shipping (1947–1984)

=== Historical ===
Arms of the historical Kingdom of Meath

== Counties ==
=== Present ===
County	Province	Arms	Blazon
Galway	Connacht		Azure thereon five mullets argent, on waves of the sea in base a Galway hooker in full sail sailing to the sinister all proper, with the motto: Ceart agus Cóir (Right and Just). Granted 22 June 1993.
Leitrim	Connacht		Per fess double arched or and vert in chief a lion passant sable and in base three fountains. Certified 1 July 1981.
Mayo	Connacht		Per fess gules and argent in chief four crosses one and three the first patriarchal the others passion crosses or, in base on waves of the sea a lymphad proper, the whole within a bordure of the third charged with nine yew trees also proper, with the Crest: On a mount vert a garden rose slipped or and with the Motto: Dia is Muire linn (God and Mary be with us). Certified 10 March 1981.
Roscommon	Connacht		Azure, on a pile vert fimbriated or, between on the dexter a ram's head argent and on the sinister an oak branch proper, a cross patée concave of the third, in base an antique crown also gold, with the motto: CONSTANS HIBERNIAE COR (Steadfast Irish heart). Certified 10 August 1961. In February 2023, the county council passed a motion that the ram should be of the Roscommon sheep breed.
Sligo	Connacht		Sable semée of escallops argent an open book proper thereon in the dexter a Celtic cross and in the sinister a rose gules, on a point [pointed] in base of the second a boar's head erased of the first armed of the fourth with the motto: Land of Heart's Desire. Granted 8 September 1982.
Carlow	Leinster		Ermine on a fess per pale argent and gules on the dexter a lion rampant gules and on the sinister two lions passant guardant Or. Recorded as arms of County Carlow c.1665
Dublin	Leinster		Or, a raven standing upon a hurdle sable; for Crest, a beacon proper and for motto: Beart do réir ár mbriathar (Action to match our speech). Granted 30 September 1944. Became obsolete in 1994 on the division into Dún Laoghaire–Rathdown, Fingal and South Dublin.
Fingal	Leinster		Vert a raven on a hurdle proper, in chief in the dexter a St. Brigid's cross and in the sinister a garb Or, on a point enhanced in base argent on waves of the sea in base of four azure and of the fourth a Viking longship sail set also proper, with the motto: Flúirse Talaimh is Mara (Abundance of Land and Sea). Granted to Fingal Area Committee 26 November 1993.
Dún Laoghaire–Rathdown	Leinster		Per chevron argent and vert, in chief an ancient Irish crown proper between in the dexter a slip of oak of the second fructed of the third [=proper] and in the sinister a trefoil slipped also of the second, in base on waves of the sea barry wavy of four of the first and azure a Viking longship sail set oars in action also proper, motto: Ó Chuan go Sliabh (From Harbour to Mountain). Granted to Dún Laoghaire–Rathdown Area Committee 7 December 1993.
South Dublin	Leinster		Argent two barrulets dancetté vert between as many bars wavy azure in chief an open book proper garnished or the dexter page charged with a Celtic cross gules and in base a fret couped sable with the mottoes: This We Hold in Trust and above Ag Seo Ár gCúram. Granted to South Dublin Area Committee 29 June 1993.
Kildare	Leinster		Argent on a saltire gules between in chief a saint Brigid's cross vert in base a sprig of oak of the last fructed proper and in fess in the dexter a harp and in the sinister a horse's head erased, both of the last, two swords in saltire points upward gold, with the motto: Meanma agus Misneach (Spirit and Courage). Granted 19 July 1991.
Kilkenny	Leinster		Ermine a fess party per pale dexter sable three garbs argent sinister quarterly 1st and 4th argent 2nd and 3rd gules a fret Or. Recorded as Arms of County Kilkenny circa 1665.
Laois	Leinster		Or on a chevron gules between in chief two fountains and in base a lion rampant sable seven ermine spots argent, with the motto: I bpáirt leis an bpobal (In partnership with the community). Granted 16 June 1998.
Longford	Leinster		Per pale azure and or a castle of two towers counterchanged on a chief wavy per pale of the second and of the first a hound courant also counterchanged with the motto: Daingean agus Dílis (Strong and Loyal). Granted 19 July 1988.
Louth	Leinster		Vert a bezant charged with a dexter hand aversant couped at the wrist proper, on a chief sable two ancient ships sails set argent, with the Crest: Between two ears of barley or conjoined at the base a sword erect point downwards proper and with the motto: Lugh sáimh-ioldánach (Lugh equally skilled in many arts). Certified 9 June 1977. The barley and green represents agriculture, while the two ships stand for the ports of Dundalk and Drogheda, and their black field recalls Muirthemne, "darkness of the sea". The hand is from Muiredach's High Cross at Monasterboice. The reference to the mythical Lugh is because Louth village, from which the county was named, is itself named after Lugh.
Meath	Leinster		Per pile enarched reversed vert and azure fimbriated argent, at the fess point an antique crown or in chief in the dexter a spiral, in the sinister a Celtic cross and in base a salmon naiant all of the third, the whole within a bordure gold with the motto: Tré Neart le Chéile (Together Strong). Granted 16 September 1988.
Offaly	Leinster		Tierced in fess vert, argent and or, a lion rampant holding between the paws a cross patée concave all of the last, the cross within an annulet of the second, on a point pointed in base sable a sprig of Andromeda polifolia proper, with the motto: ESTO FIDELIS (Be Faithful). Granted 31 August 1983.
Westmeath	Leinster		Per saltire azure and gules, in the fess point an annulet between two lions rampant and respecting each other all or, in chief a swan swimming and in base a Norse helmet both proper, with the motto: Triath ós Triathaibh (Noble above nobility). Certified 7 August 1968.
Wexford	Leinster		Per bend purpure and or, on a band wavy argent between in chief a lion rampant holding in the paws a pike of the last and on rocks in base a representation of the Hook Lighthouse all proper, two spear heads bendwise points upwards also proper, with the motto: Exemplar Hiberniae (An example to Ireland). Granted 19 July 1988.
Wicklow	Leinster		Per fess dancetée azure and vert, in chief a lion passant to the sinister reguardant Or between two oak branches proper, in base a representation of St. Kevin's Church at Glendalough proper with the motto: Meanma Saor (Free Spirits). Certified 1 August 1956.
Clare	Munster		Per fesse dancetée azure and or on a pale counter-changed between in chief in the dexter a rose and in the sinister an antique crown of the second and in base in the dexter an annulet rayonée and in the sinister a stag's head erased gules, in chief a tau cross proper and in base a pile reversed of the second fleuried at the point argent; a point pointed barry wavy of the last and of the first and with the motto: Dílis d'ar nOidhreacht (True to our heritage). Granted 6 September 1985.
Cork	Munster		The county council has no arms. The seal was adopted in 1899: In the centre are the arms of Cork City. The other six shields are arms of towns in the county, although none have been officially recorded. These represent Youghal, Castlemartyr, Bandon, Midleton, Kinsale and Charleville.
Kerry	Munster		Per fess vert and or a fess indented point in point argent and azure between in chief an antique crown of the second between two cross crosslets fitchée of the third and in base a representation of the boat of St. Brendan of the first, with the motto: Comhar, Cabhair, Cairdeas (Co-operation, Help, Friendship). Granted 12 April 1984.
Limerick	Munster		Vert three pallets wavy argent, a cross patée convexed within an annulet Or, with the crest: A figure of Patrick Sarsfield, the right hand grasping a sword, the left hand outstretched and pointing, all proper and with the motto: Cuimhnigh ar Luimneach (Remember Limerick). Certified 24 May 1976.
Tipperary	Munster		Ermine a fesse quarterly 1 and 4 Or a chief indented azure 2 and 3 gules three covered cups gold. Recorded as Arms of County Tipperary c.1665, when it was a county palatine of the Earls of Ormond. Tipperary County Council was established under the Local Government Reform Act 2014 and does not yet have a coat of arms.
Waterford	Munster		Azure on a pile reversed throughout argent, between in the dexter an eagle's head erased of the second holding in its beak or, three stalks of wheat of the third and in the sinister a stag's head erased also of the second thereon between the attires a Latin cross of the third, a representation of the round tower of Ardmore proper, on a point in base barry-wavy of six of the first and second a lymphad, sail set, oars in action, flags flying gold with the motto: Déisi oc Declán co Bráth (May the Déise remain with Declan forever). Granted 4 February 1997.
Antrim (NI)	Ulster		Or a lion rampant gules holding in the dexter paw a cross crosslet fitchée azure; on a chief vert between two towers a pale argent thereon a dexter hand appaumée gules and for a Crest On a wreath of the colours, A demi figure representing St. Patrick in a habit vert trimmed with gold, the nimbus or holding in the dexter hand a slip of shamrock and supporting over the sinister shoulder a shepherd's crook proper. Supporters: On either side a wolf gules, that on the dexter holding in the mouth a slip of flax flowered, that on the sinister a wheat ear both stalked and leaved proper [the whole upon a Compartment of basaltic rock proper, representing the Giants Causeway. Motto: Per angusta ad augusta (Through Trial to Triumph). Granted 28 March 1952 by Garter and Norroy & Ulster Kings of Arms.
Armagh (NI)	Ulster		County Armagh has never received a grant of arms. Traditionally the reputed arms of the City of Armagh were used. These were a blue shield bearing a gold harp (the arms of Ireland). It has been suggested that Armagh used these arms as it is the ecclesiastical capital of Ireland. Sometimes the field of the arms has been depicted as green, identical to the arms of the province of Leinster. These arms have appeared upon Northern Ireland bank notes representing the county.
Cavan	Ulster		Party per pale Or and Sable two fountains palewise between in chief two lions counter-rampant and in base a lion passant guardant all counter-changed. With the motto: Feardhacht is Fírinne (Manliness and Truth). Certified by Chief Herald 20 September 1979.
Donegal	Ulster		Barry wavy of eight vert and or, on an inescutcheon ermine a cross crosslet fitchée gules, with the Crest: In front of four quill pens erect points downwards or a dove proper, mantled gules doubled argent with the Motto: Mutuam habeatis caritatem ((Maintain among you) Mutual love or charity) and with the Badge: A cross crosslet fitchée gules enfiled with a lunula points upwards or. Certified by Chief Herald 20 May 1974.
Down (NI)	Ulster		Vert, on a fess Or fretty Gules a fish naiant Argent, in chief three garbs Or and in base on water barry wavy of four Argent and Azure a lymphad sail furled pennon and flags flying Or between two flax flowers slipped and leaved proper.; Crest: On a wreath of the colours, Out of an ancient crown a dexter cubit arm vested and cuffed Argent, the hand proper grasping a Celtic crozier Or, looped about the shaft a snake, head downwards and to the sinister Vert.; Supporters: On either side an Irish Elk guardant proper.; Motto: Absque Labore Nihil (Nothing Without Labour).; Granted by Garter and Norroy & Ulster 15 December 1967.
Fermanagh (NI)	Ulster		Barry wavy argent and azure, two flaunches vert; over all a representation of the Watergate at Enniskillen Or, flying from the battlements to the dexter a banner of St. Patrick and for a crest out of a coronet of four shamrocks set upon a rim Or a mount vert, thereon a horse passant argent, caparisoned gules, thereon a knight in full armour, in the dexter hand a sword erect proper [hilt and pomel Or.] Supporters: On either side a brock proper charged on the shoulder with a bezant, thereon a dexter hand couped gules. Motto: FEOR MAGH EANAGH. Granted by Garter and Norroy & Ulster 20 August 1954.
Londonderry (NI)	Ulster		Per chevron Gules and Or, in chief a flax flower proper between two garbs of the second, in base a dexter hand appaumée couped at the wrist of the first; the shield ensigned with a mural crown gold. Supporters: On either side a sea dragon argent, each charged on the wing with a cross Gules and wreathed about the neck with a garland of oak stalked and leaved and fructed proper. Motto: Auxilium A Domino (Help comes from the Lord). Granted by Garter and Norroy & Ulster 1 February 1951.
Monaghan	Ulster		Per pale azure and argent, in the dexter an ancient Irish shield or and in the sinister a horse's head erased sable; on a chief per pale of the second and of the first, in the dexter a sword in bend sinister point upwards proper and in the sinister an ancient Irish drinking cup of the third and with the Motto: Dúthracht agus Dícheall (Diligence and Best Endeavour). Granted by chief Herald 10 January 1984.
Tyrone (NI)	Ulster		Per fesse indented Sable and Argent, in chief a mullet of eight points of the second charged with a fleur-de-lys of the first, in base a dexter hand appaumée Gules. Crest: On a wreath Argent and Gules, On a mount and in front of a castle of two towers, a hurst, issuant from the battlements of the castle a dexter arm embowed in armour, the hand grasping a sword in bend sinister, all proper. Supporters: On either side a lion rampant, that to the dexter Or gorged with a ribbon, pendent therefrom an escutcheon Argent charged with a cross Gules, and that to the sinister Gules gorged with a ribbon Argent, pendent therefrom an escutcheon Azure charged with a saltire also Argent. Motto: Consilio et Prudentia (By Wisdom and Prudence). Granted by Garter and Norroy & Ulster 24 May 1951.

=== Former ===
County	Province	Arms	Blazon
North Tipperary	Munster		The county council had no formal coat of arms, and instead adopted the traditional coat of arms of Tipperary.
South Tipperary	Munster		Per fess ermine and barry wavy of six argent and azure, a fess quarterly, first and fourth quarters or a chief indented azure, second and third quarters gules three covered cups or, and in base three salmon naiant two and one proper, with the crest: A lion couchant or langued gules and with the motto: Vallis Aurea Suirensis (The Golden Vale of the Suir). Granted to South Tipperary County Council on 6 July 1990.

== Towns and cities ==
Arms currently or formerly used to represent towns and cities in Ireland include:

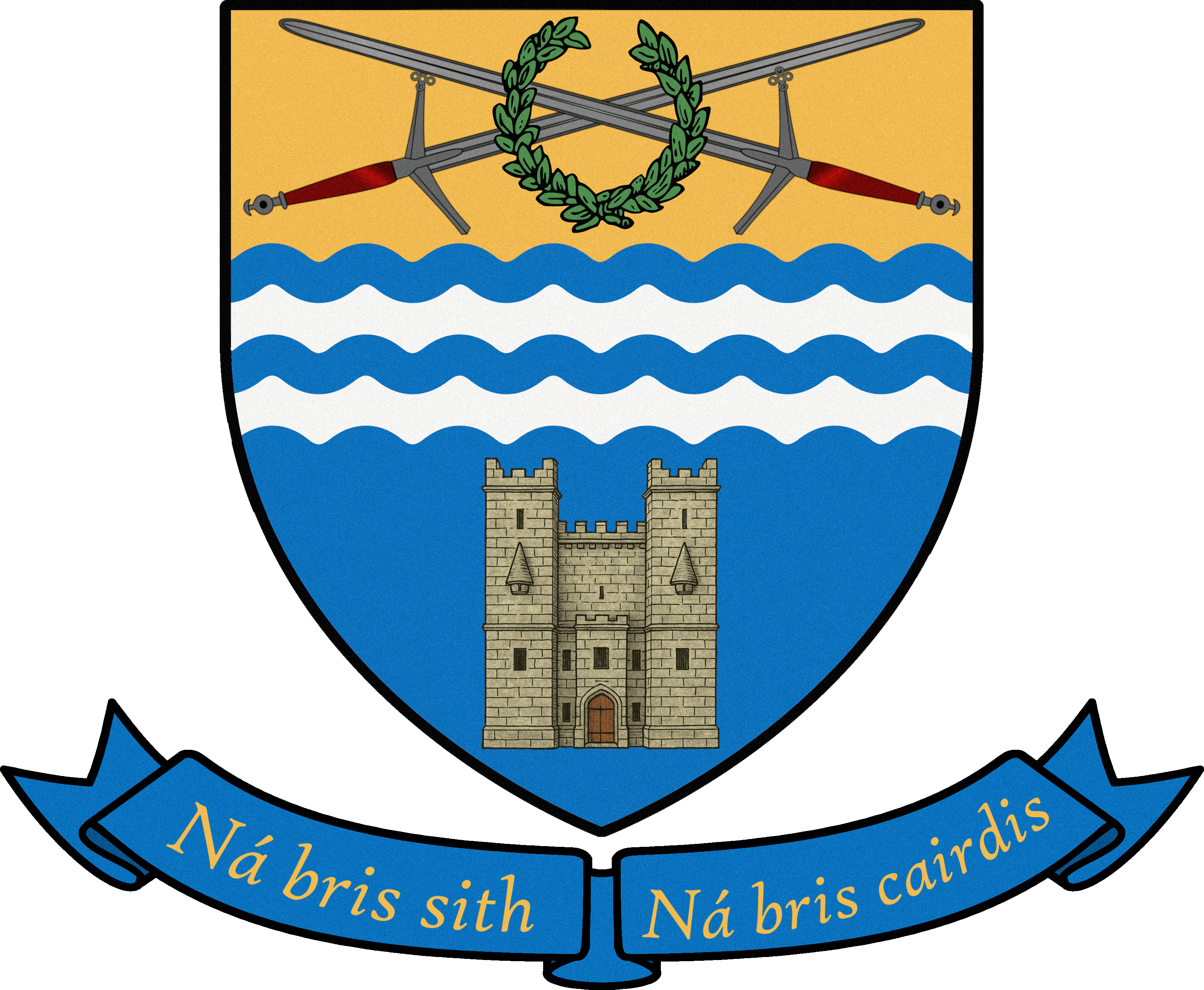
Ardee, County Louth

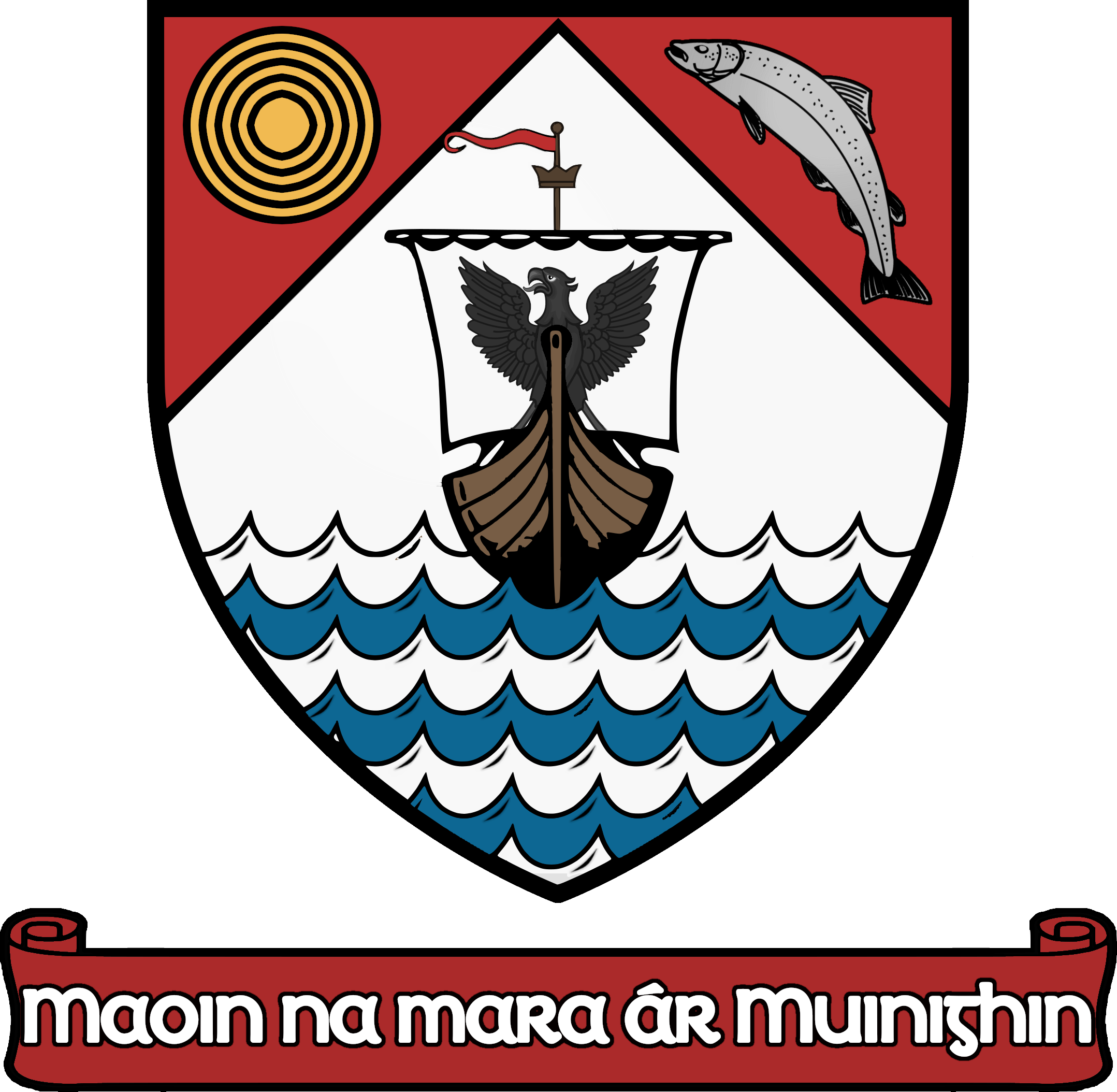
Arklow, County Wicklow

Armagh, County Armagh

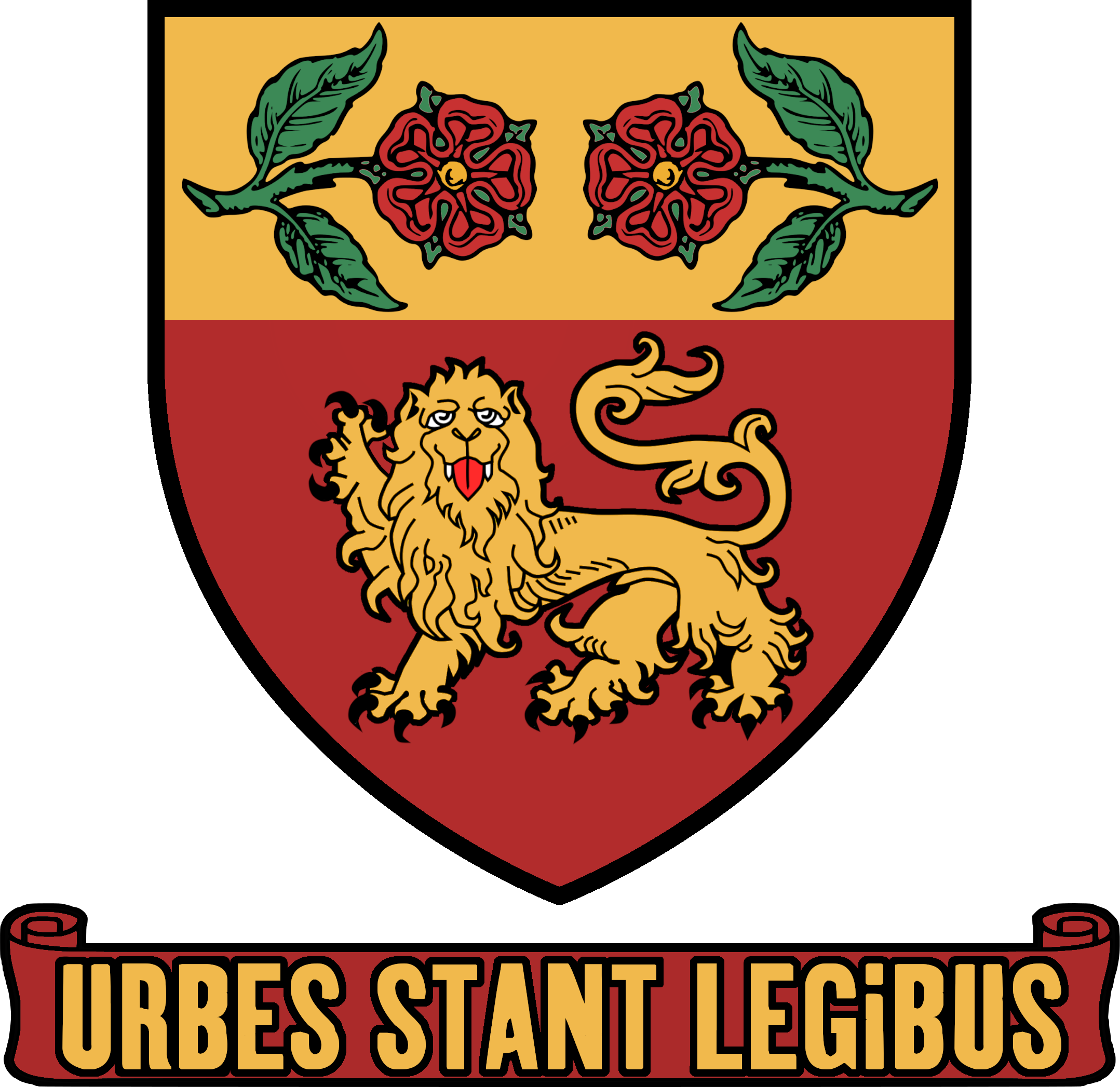
Athlone, County Westmeath/County Roscommon

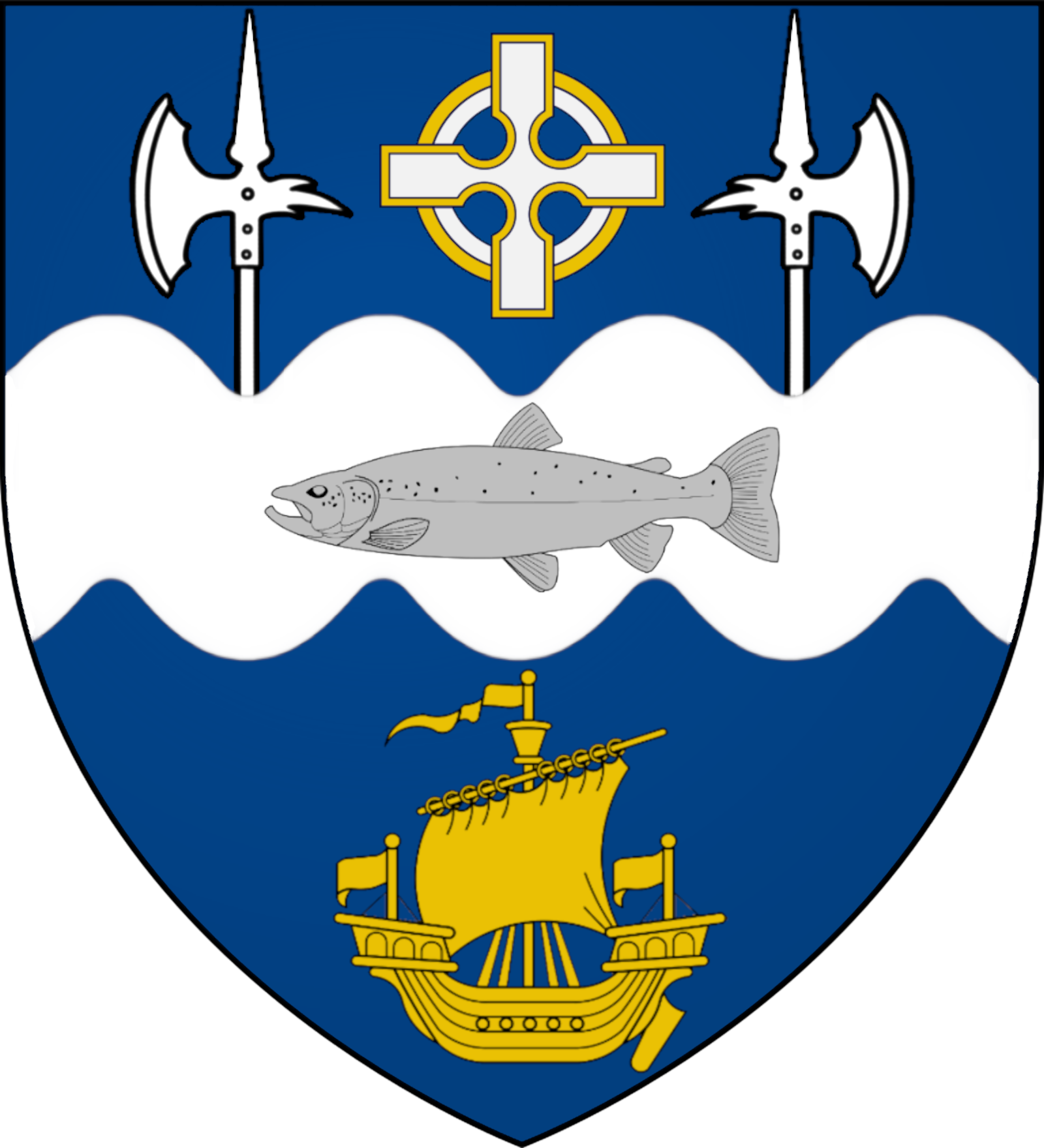
Ballina, County Mayo

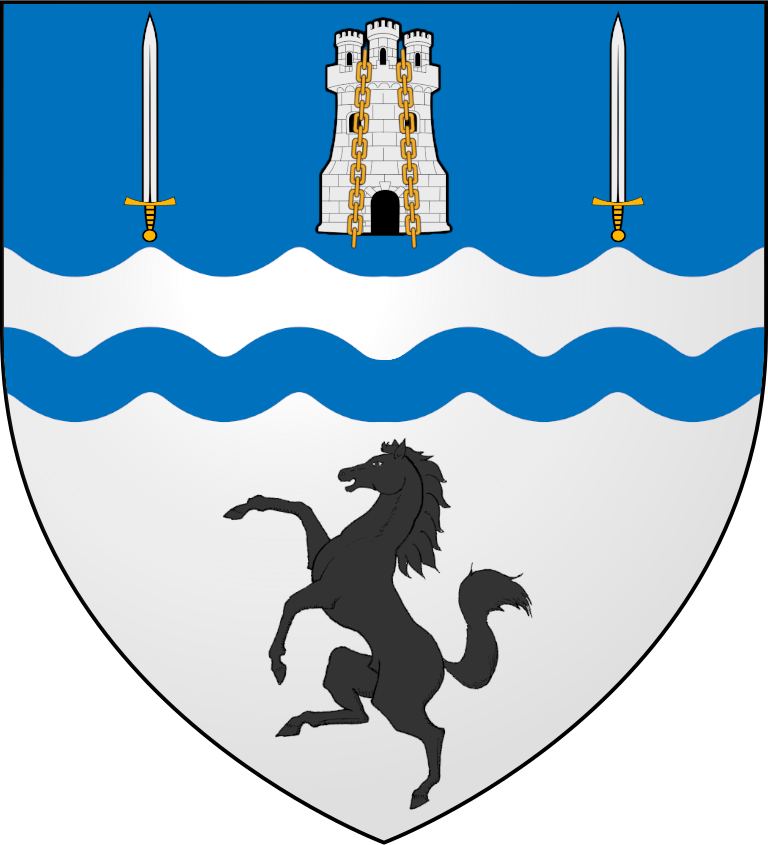
Ballinasloe, County Galway

Bantry, County Cork

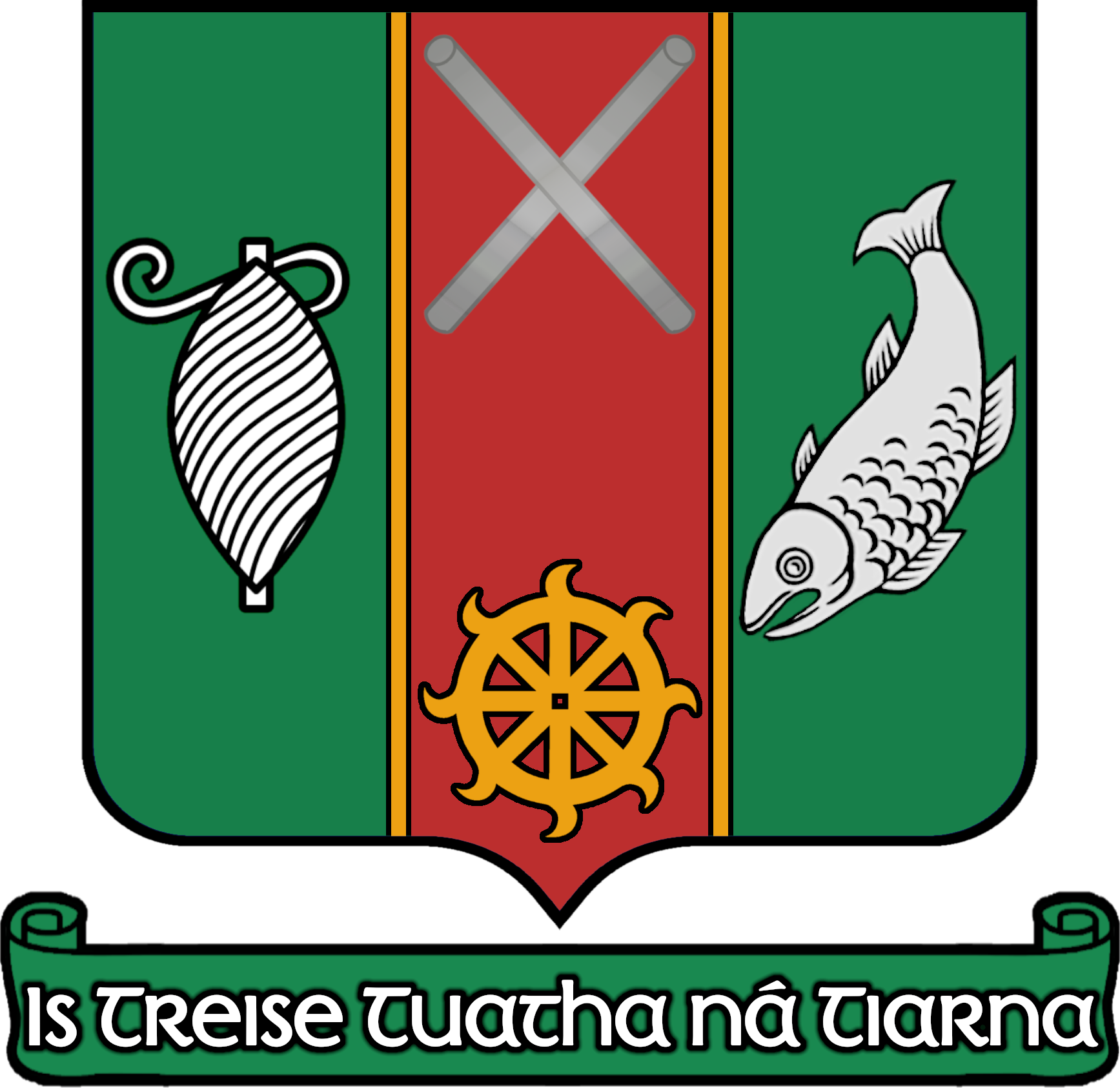
Balbriggan, County Dublin

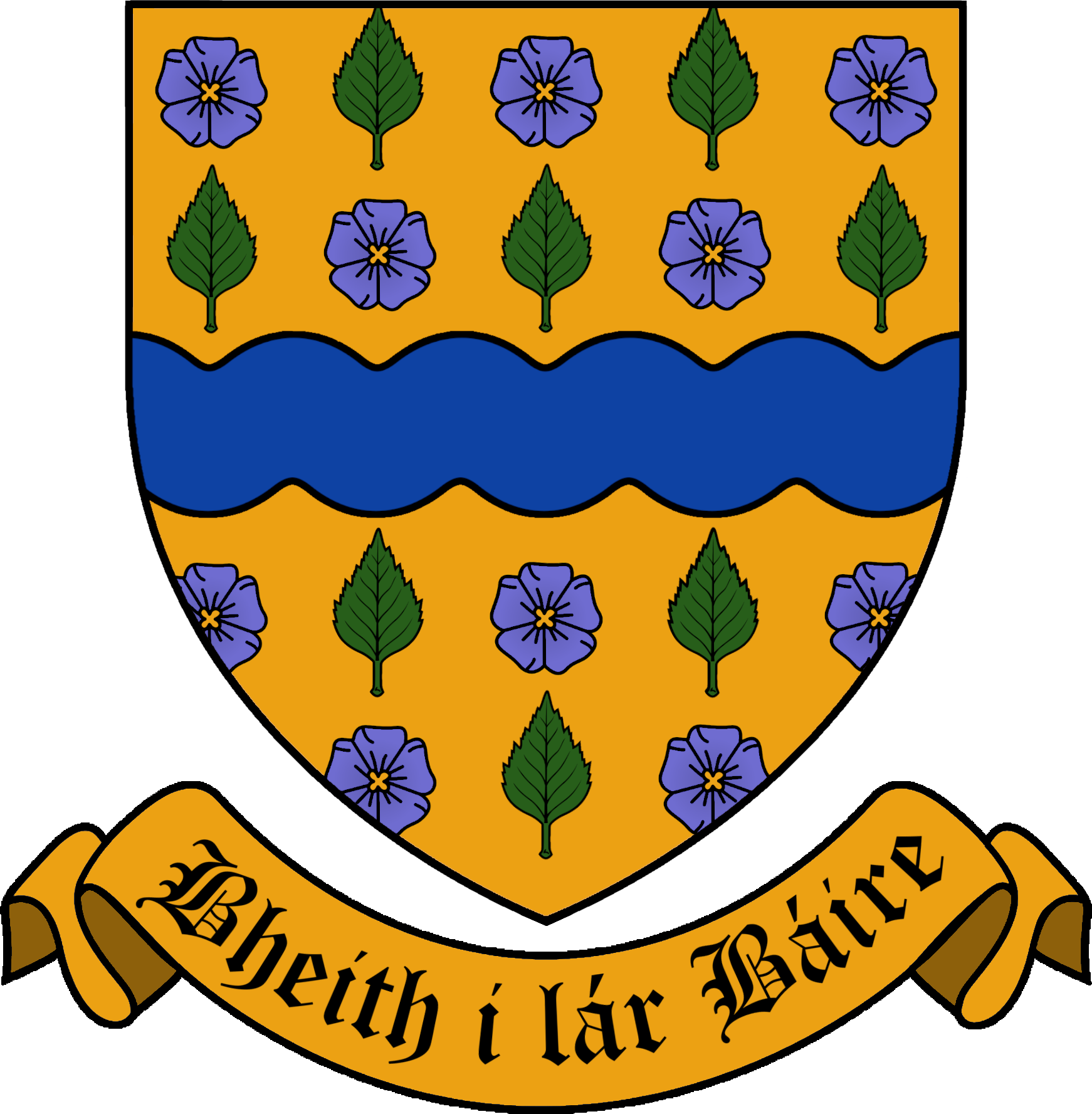
Ballybay, County Monaghan

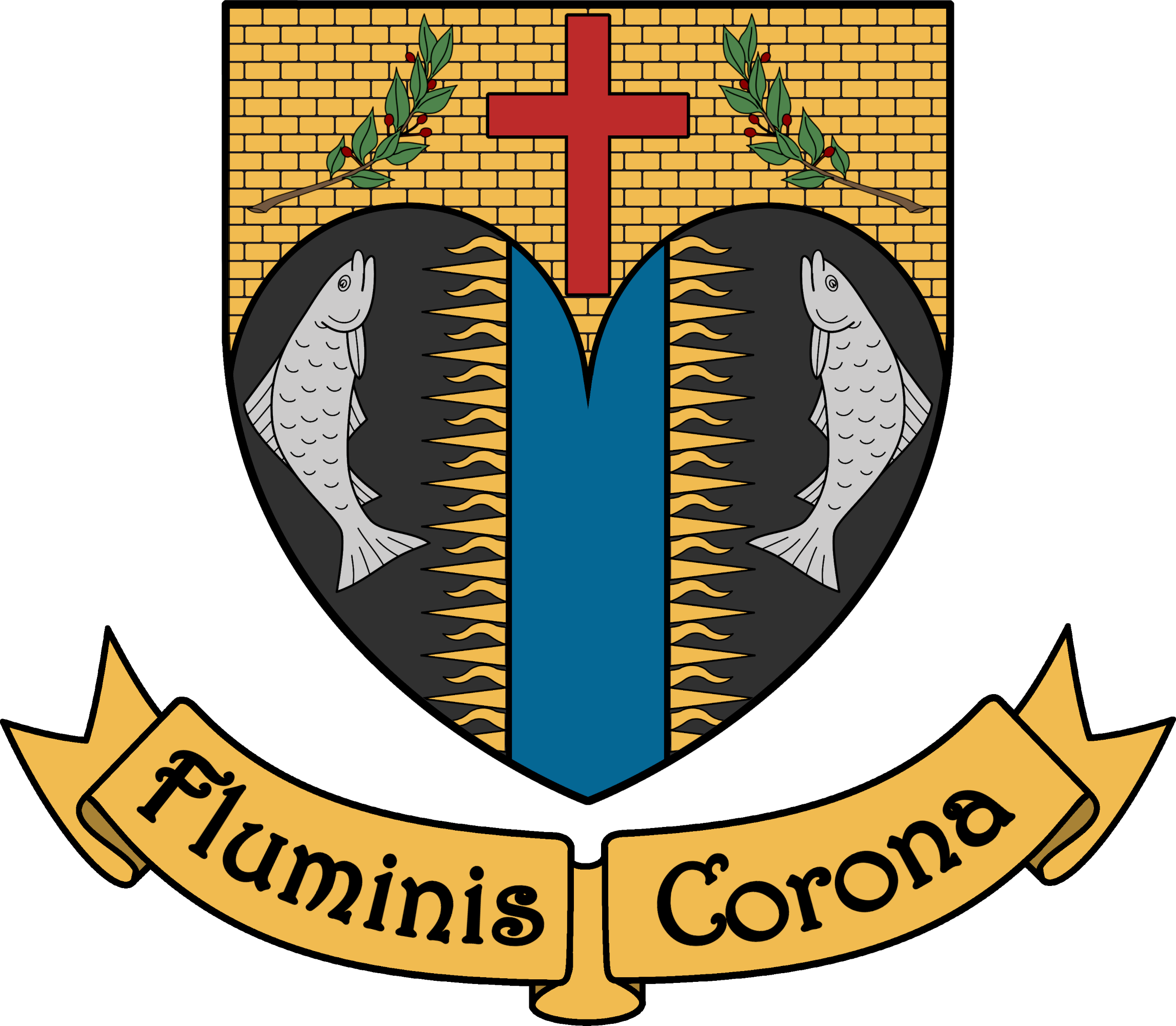
Ballyshannon, County Donegal

Ballymena, County Antrim

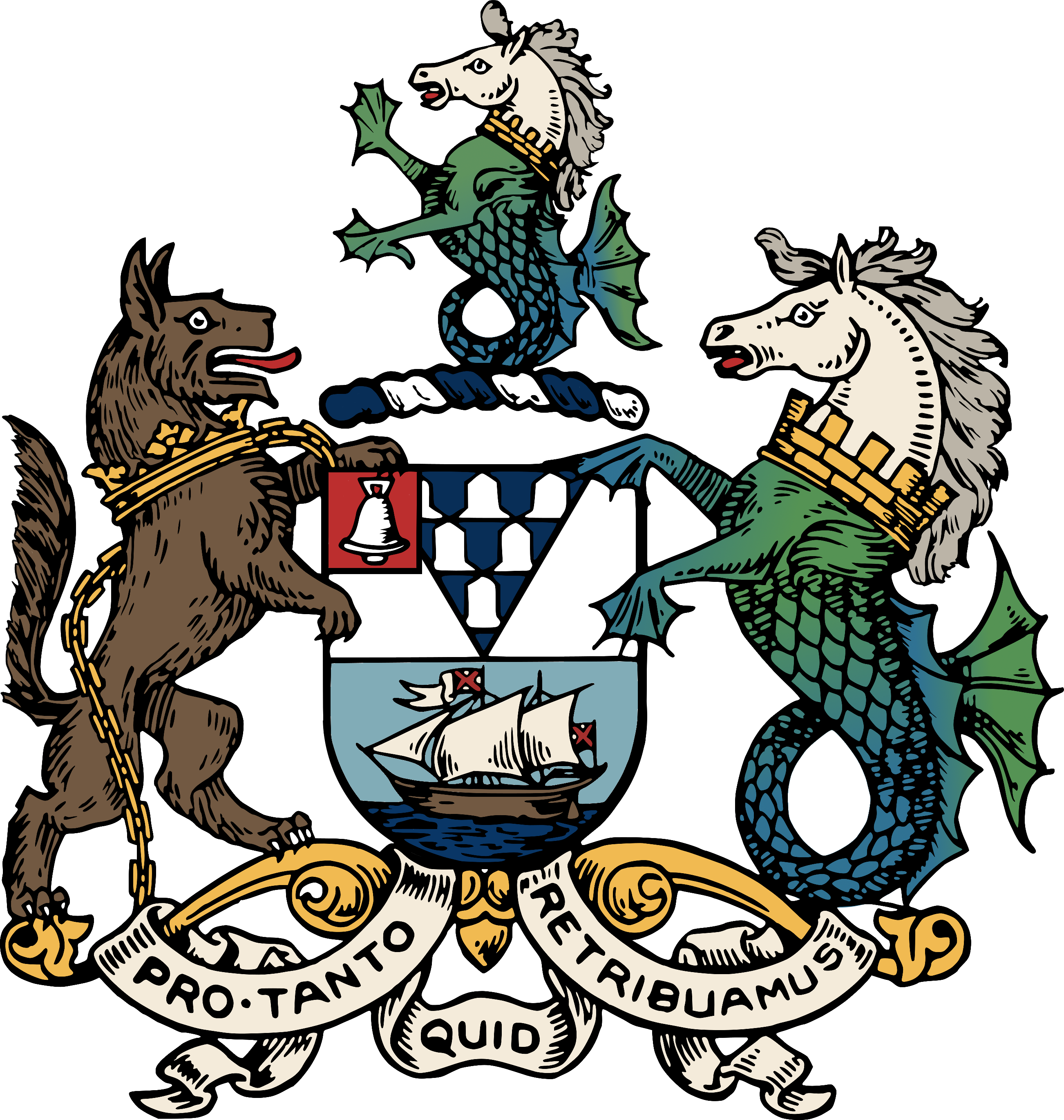
Belfast, County Antrim

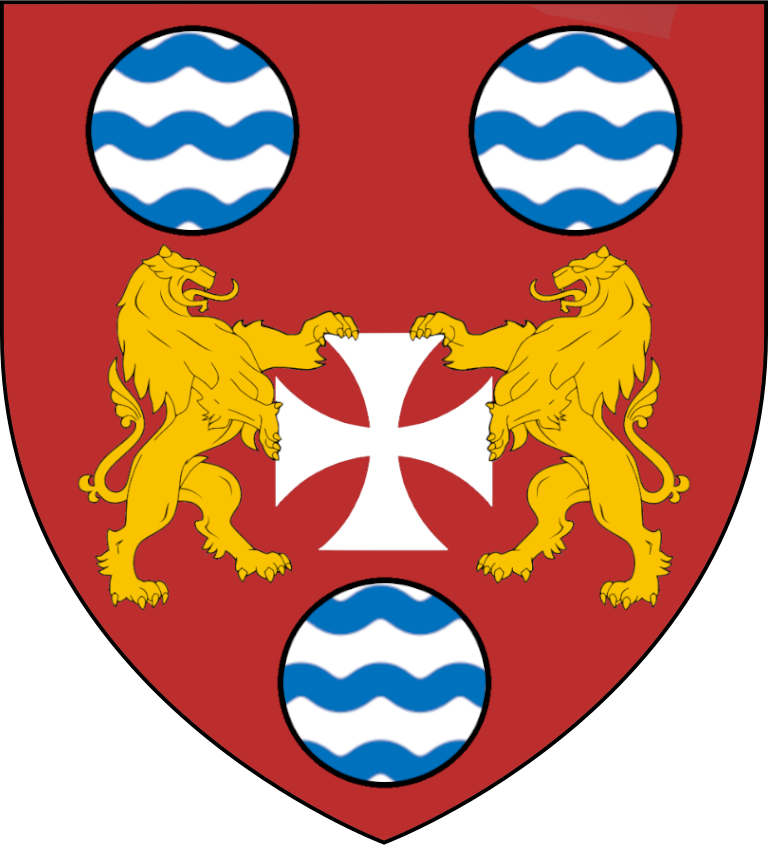
Birr, County Offaly

Bray, County Wicklow

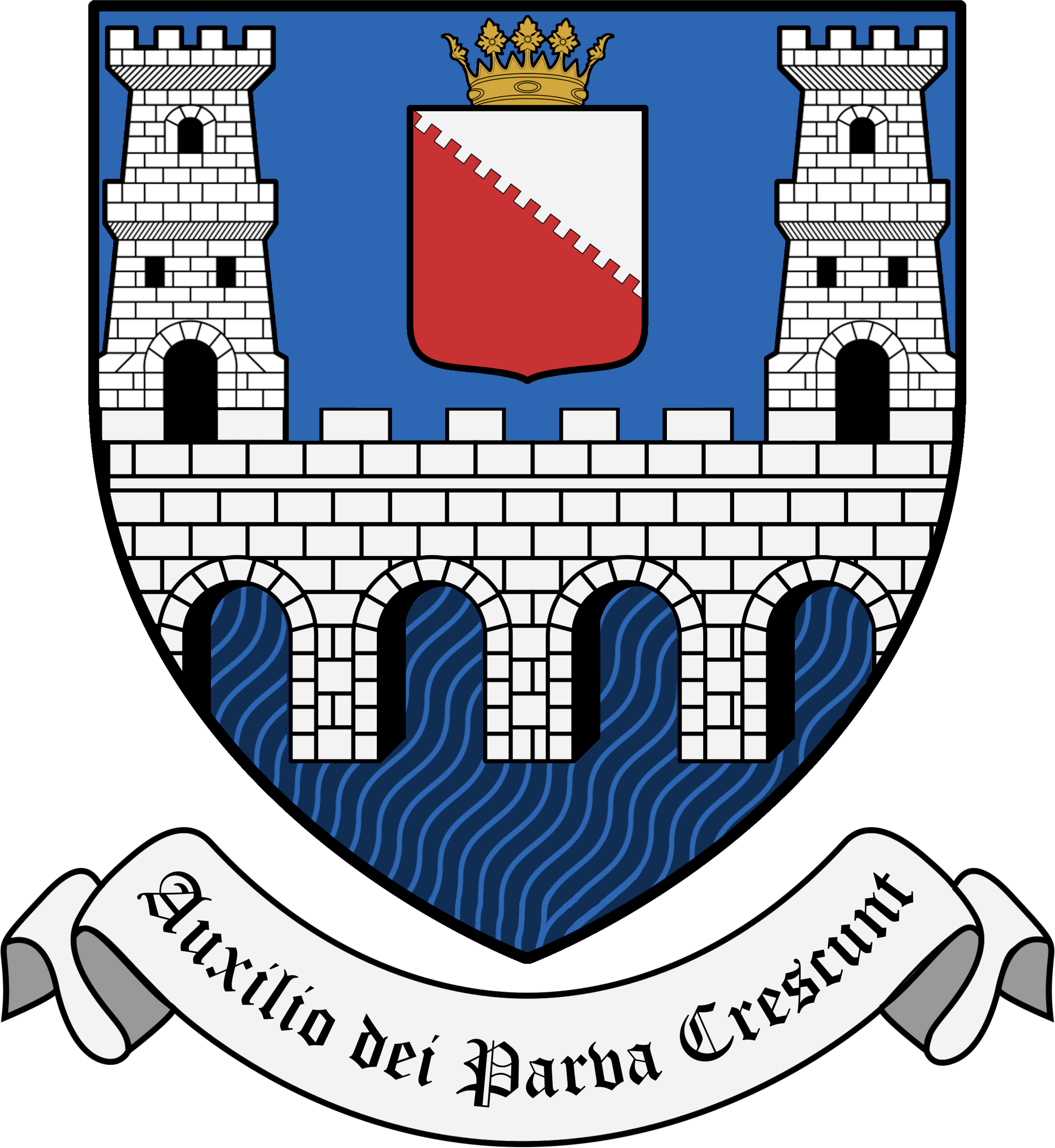
Bandon, County Cork

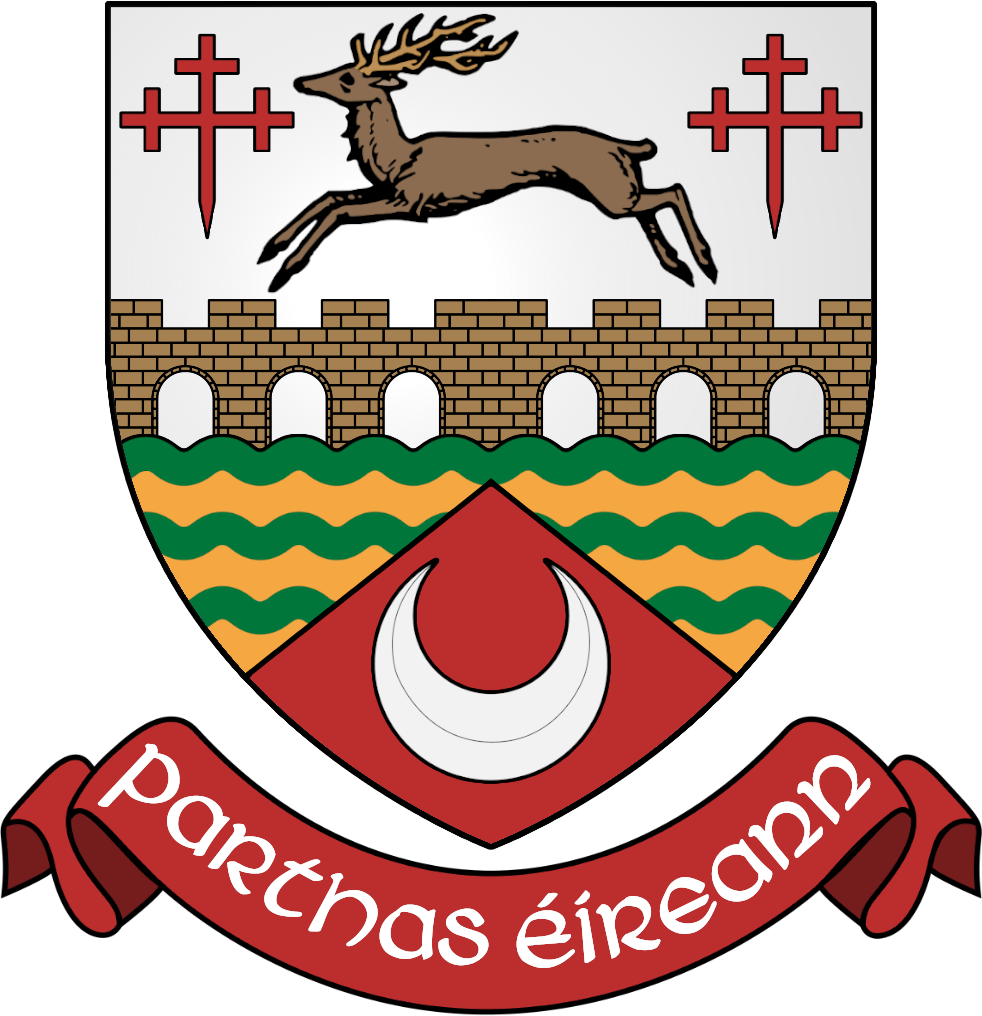
Buncrana, Inishowen, County Donegal

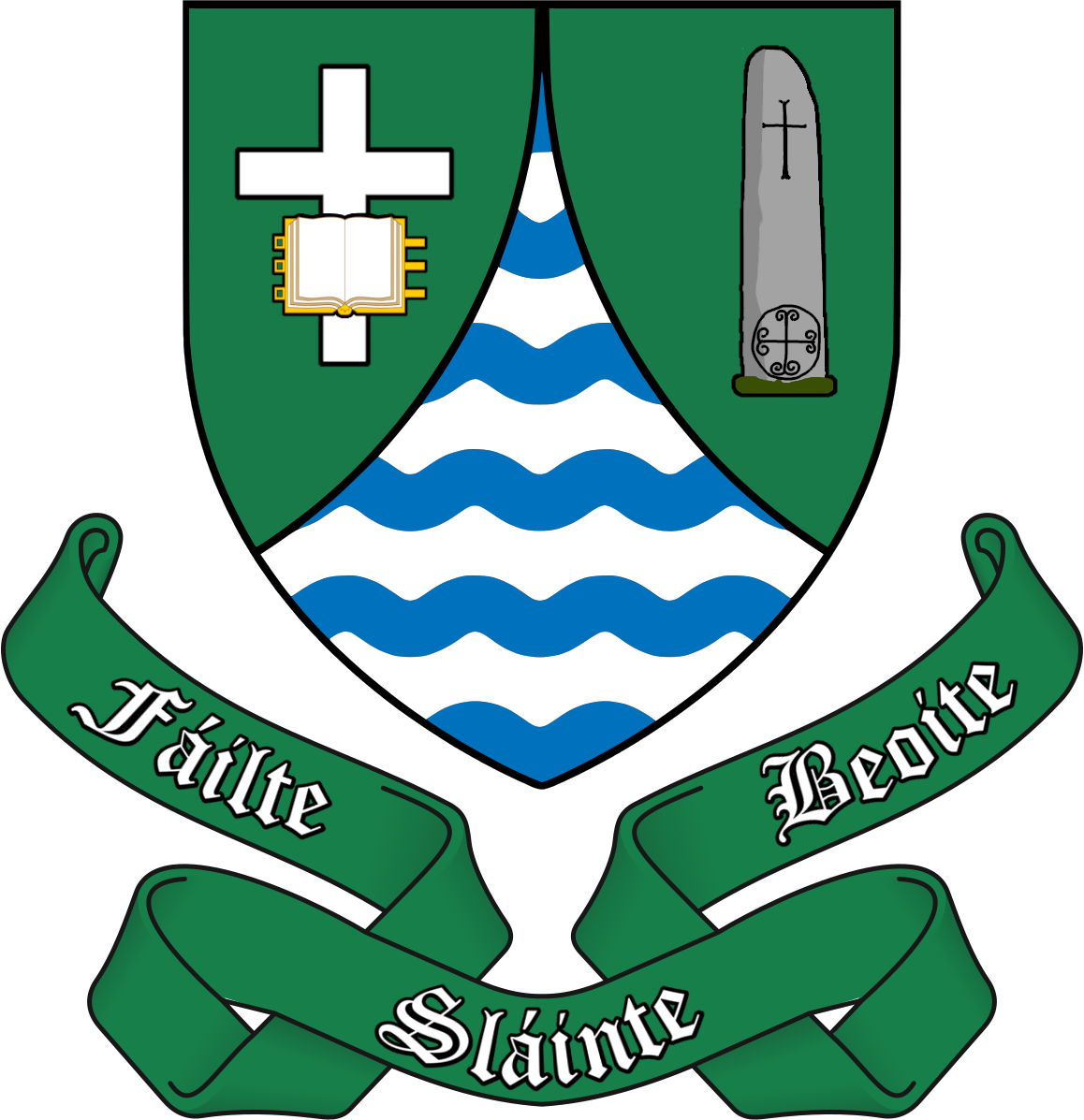
Bundoran, County Donegal

Castlebar, County Mayo

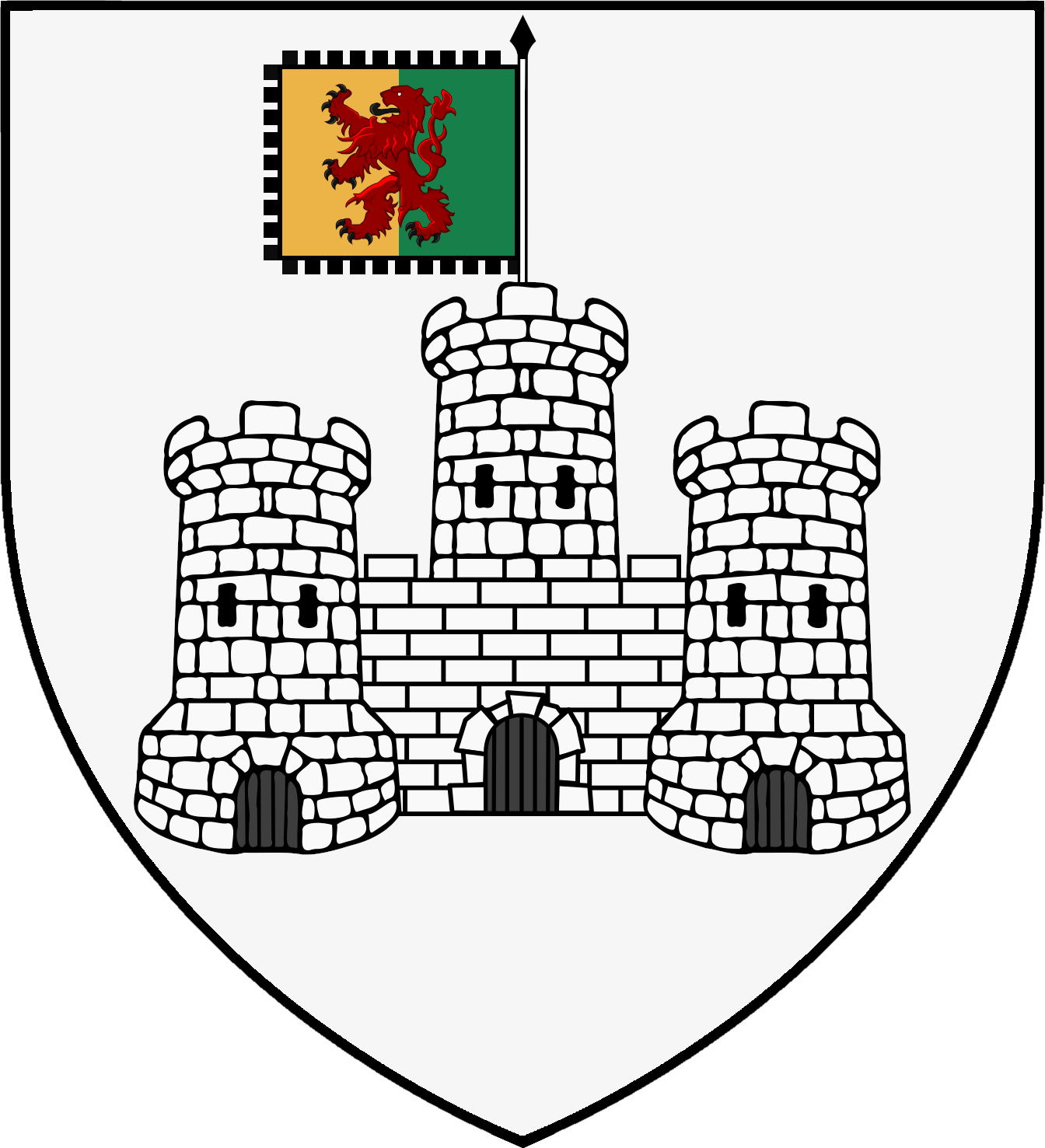
Carlow, County Carlow

Cóbh, County Cork

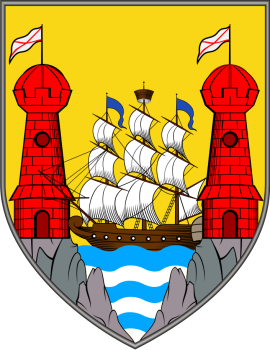
Cork City, County Cork

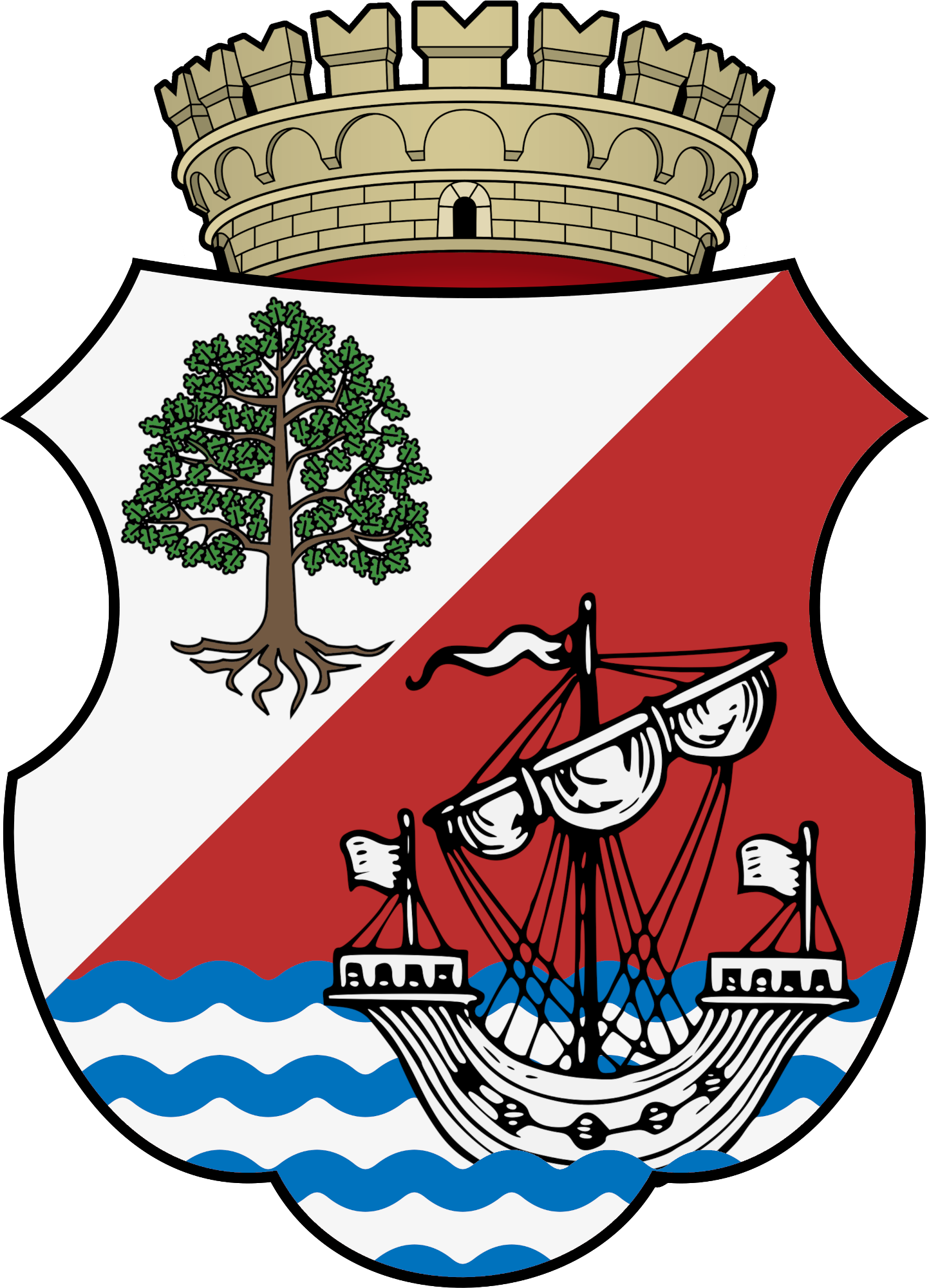
Clonakilty, County Cork

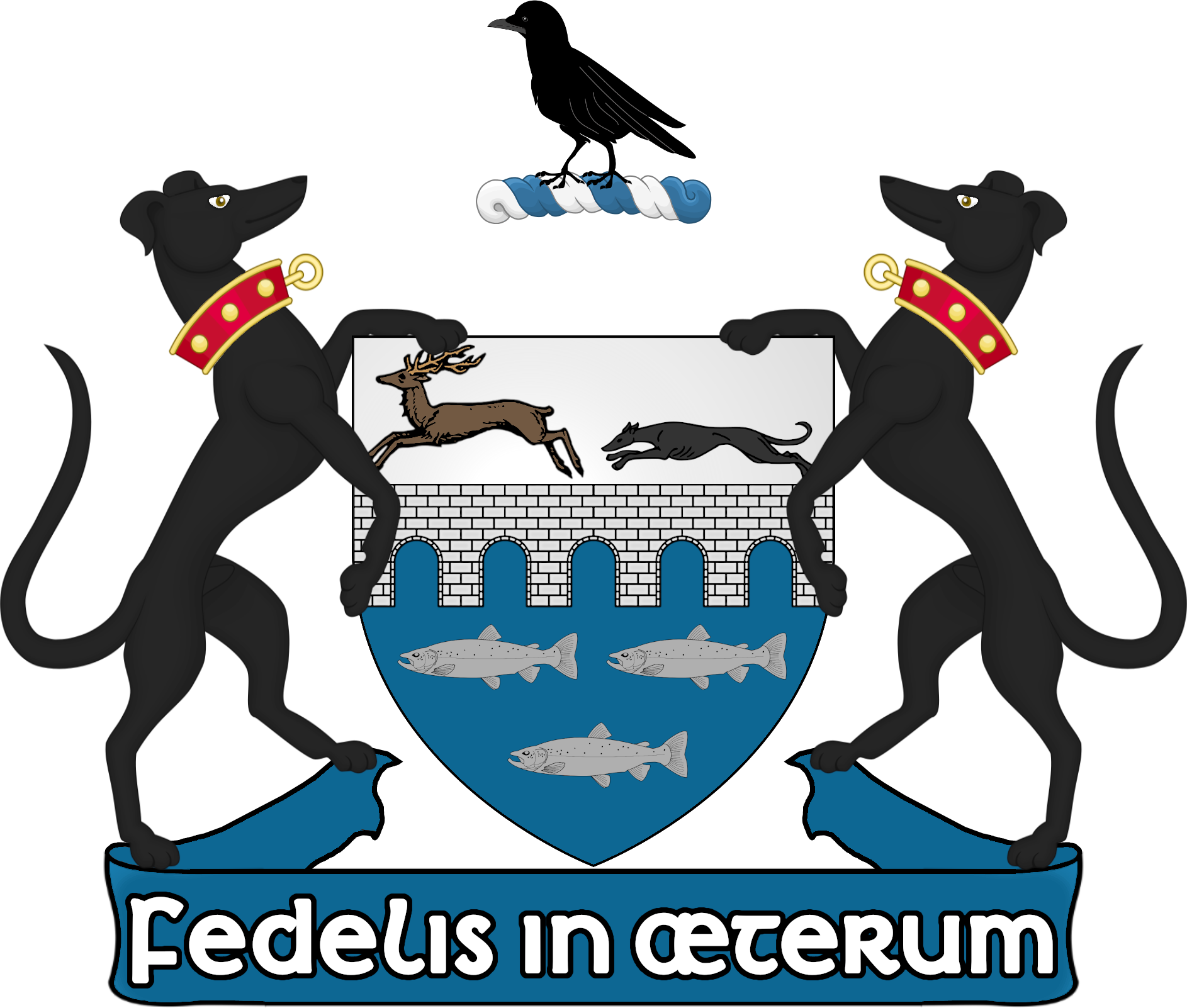
Clonmel, County Tipperary

Derry, County Londonderry

Drogheda, County Louth

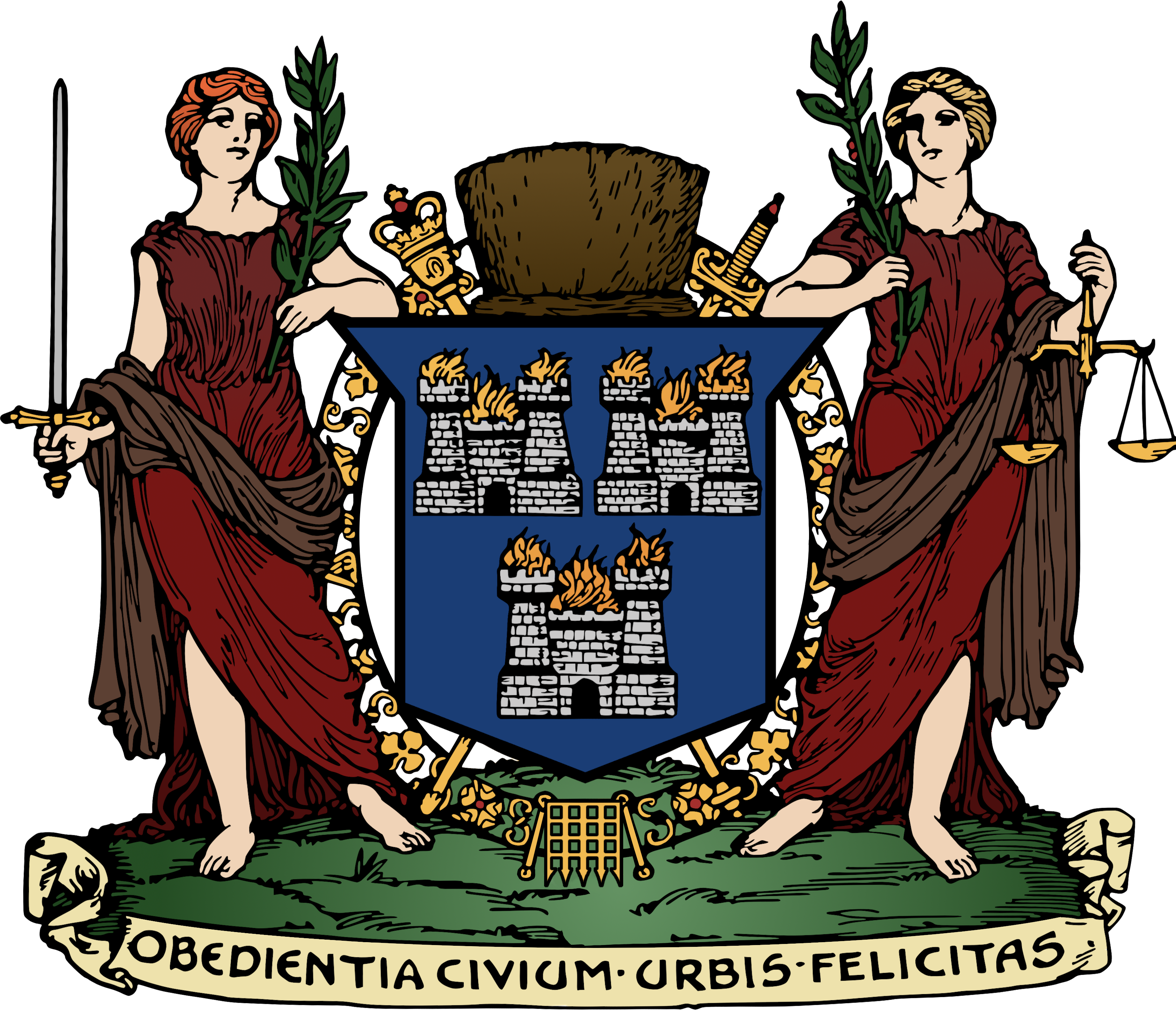
Dublin, County Dublin

Dundalk, County Louth

Dungannon, County Tyrone

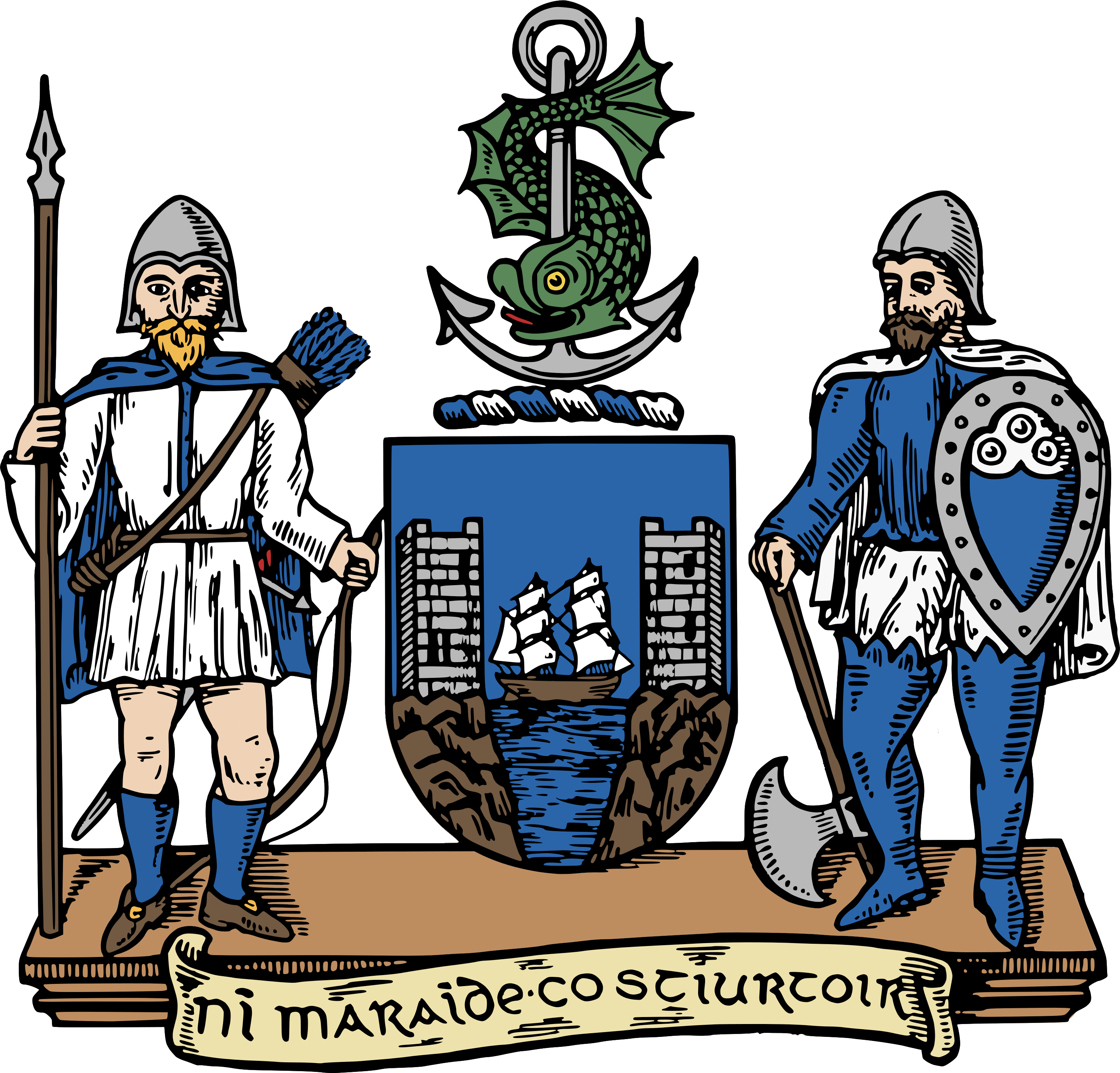
Dungarvan, County Waterford

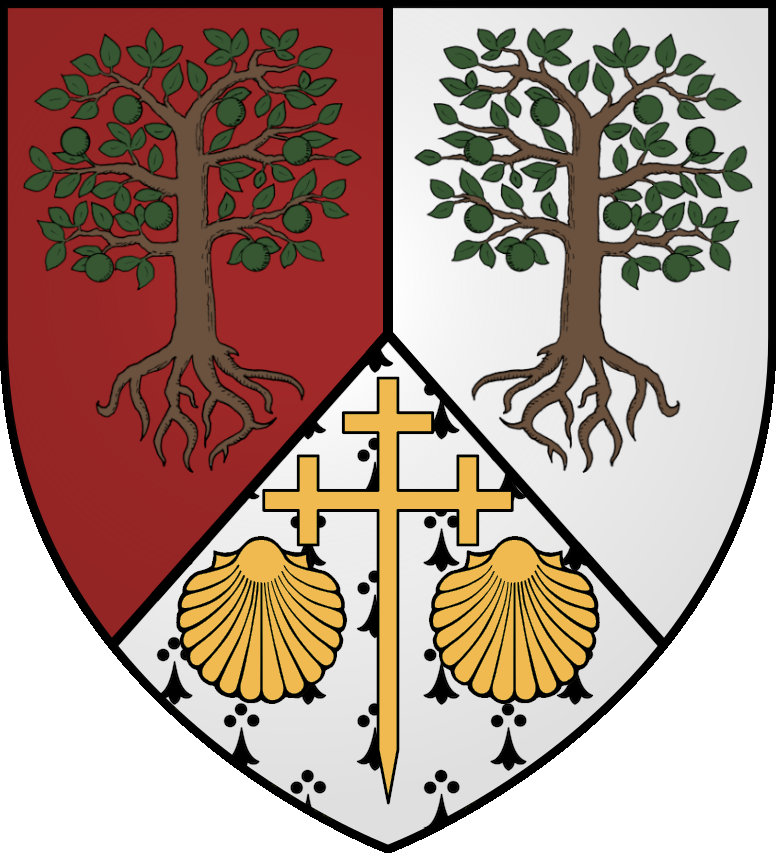
Edenderry, County Offaly

Ennis, County Clare

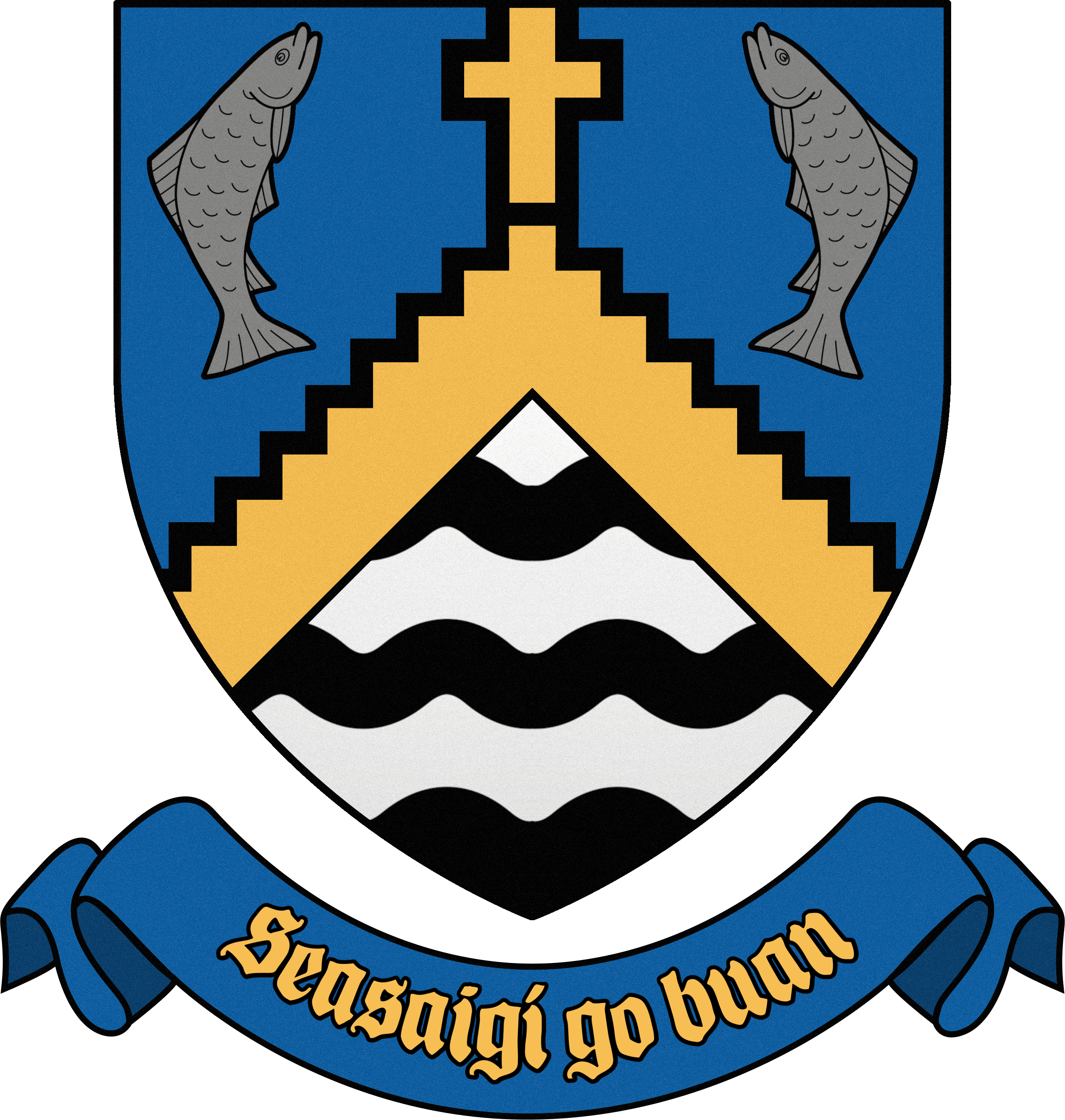
Fermoy, County Cork

Galway City, County Galway

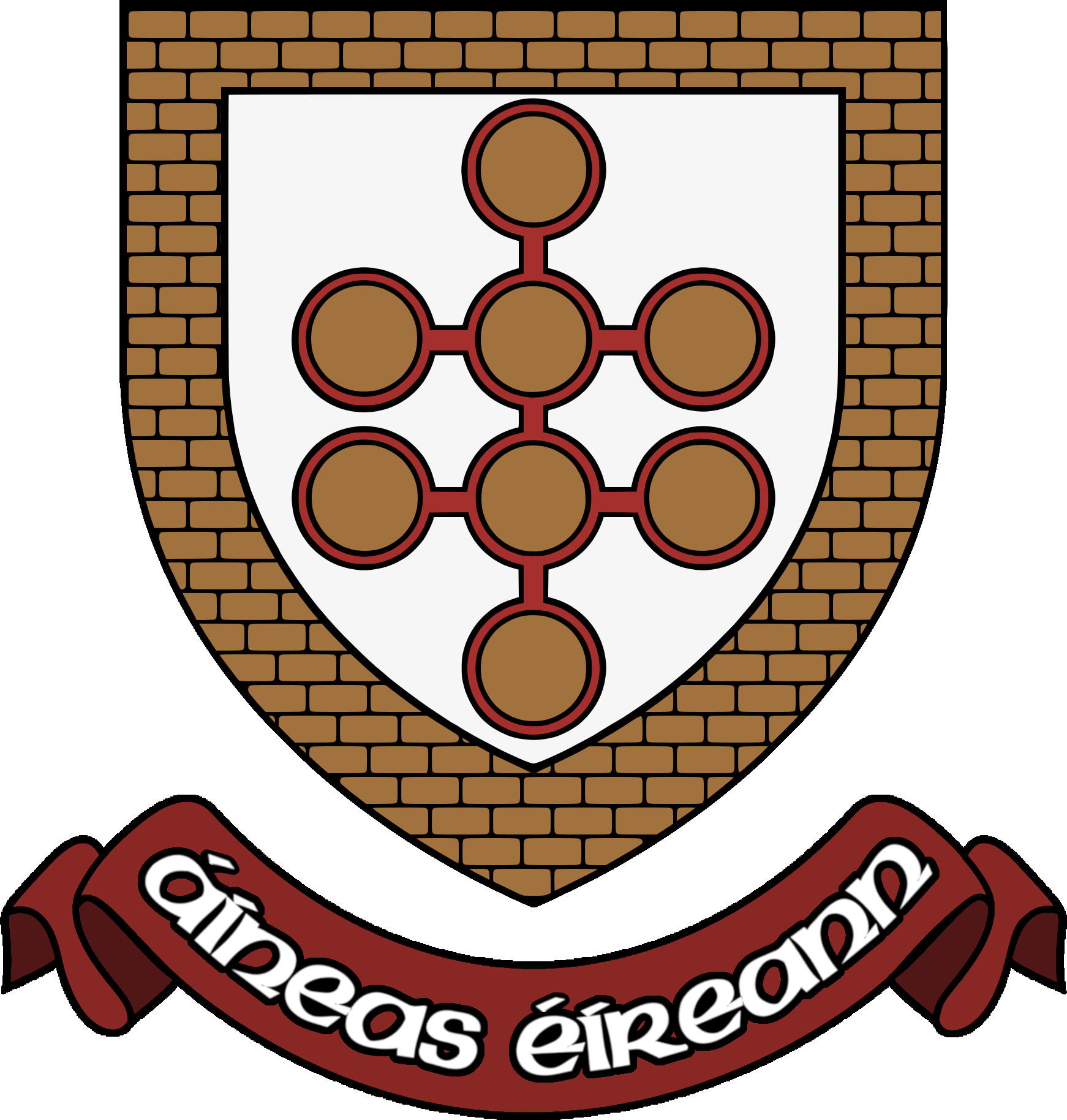
Kells, County Meath

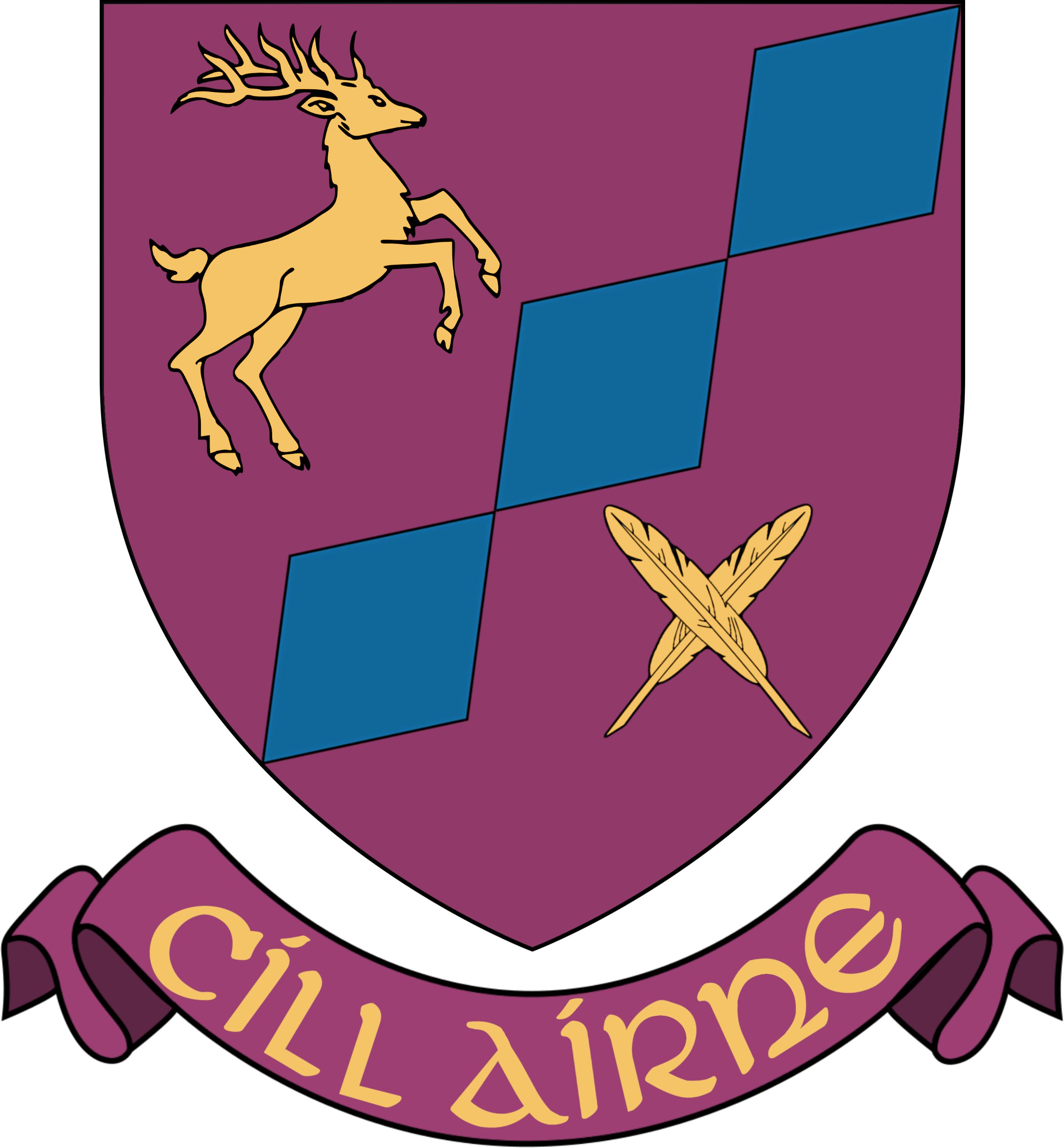
Killarney, County Kerry

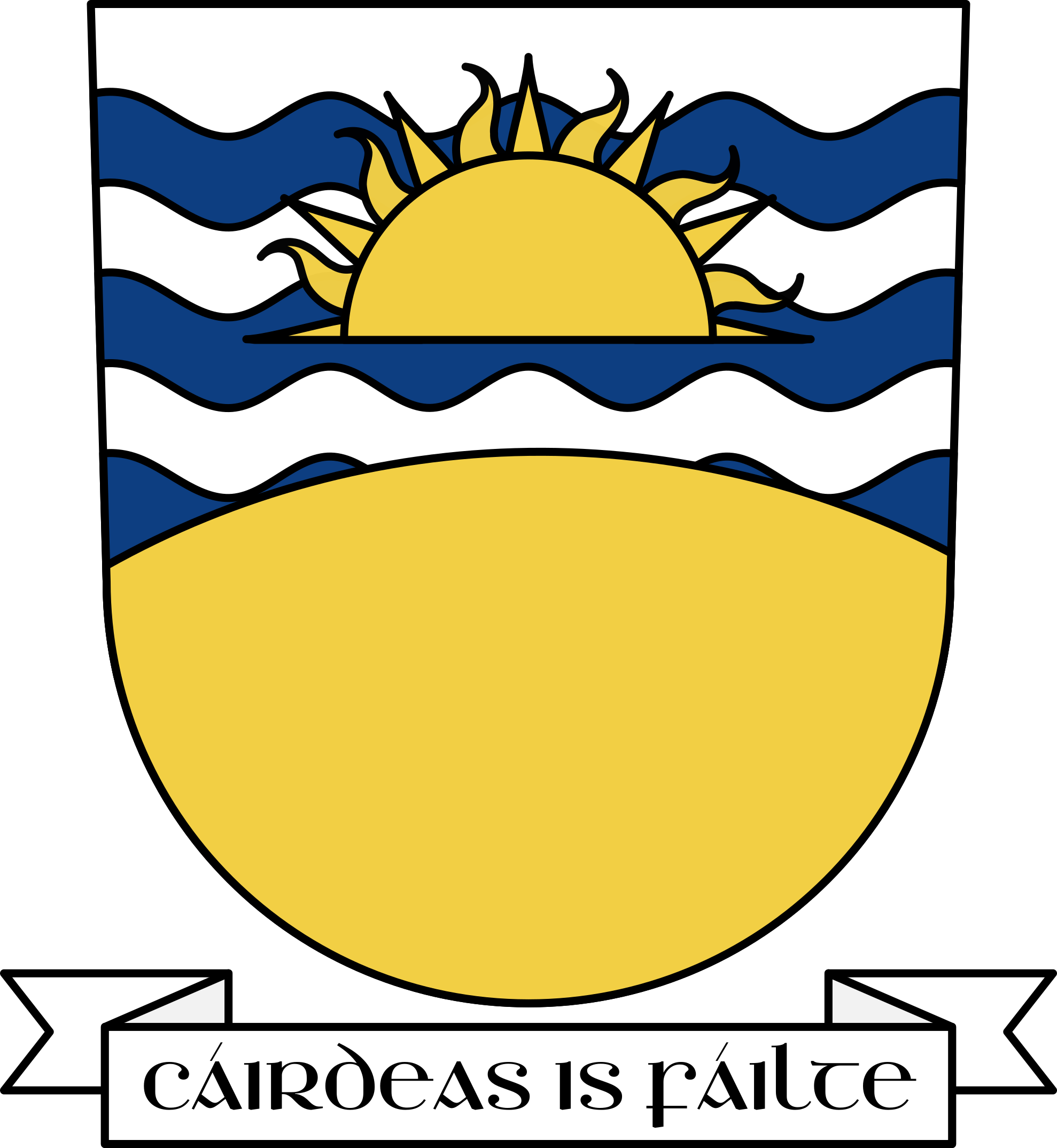
Kilkee, County Clare

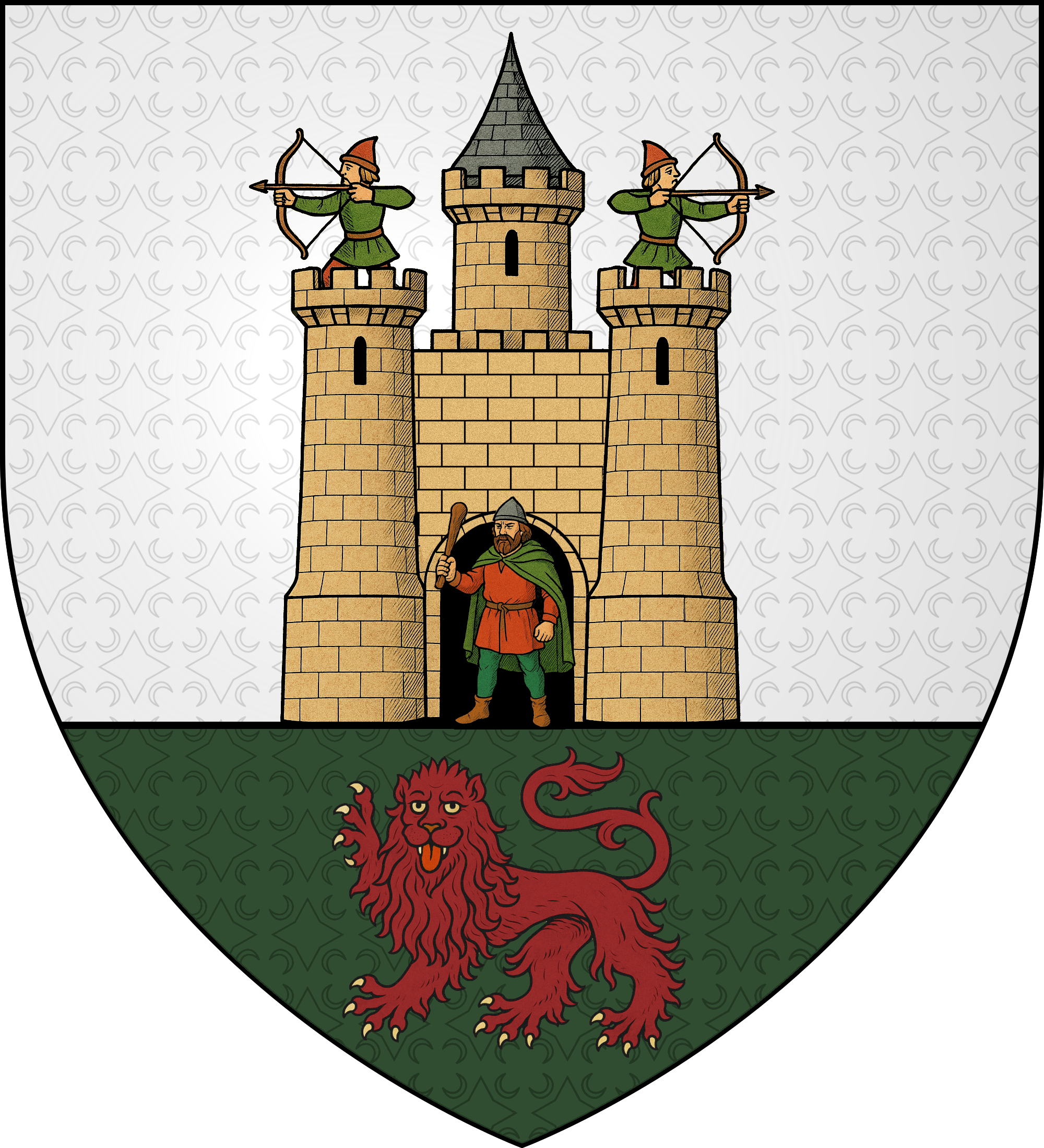
Kilkenny, County Kilkenny

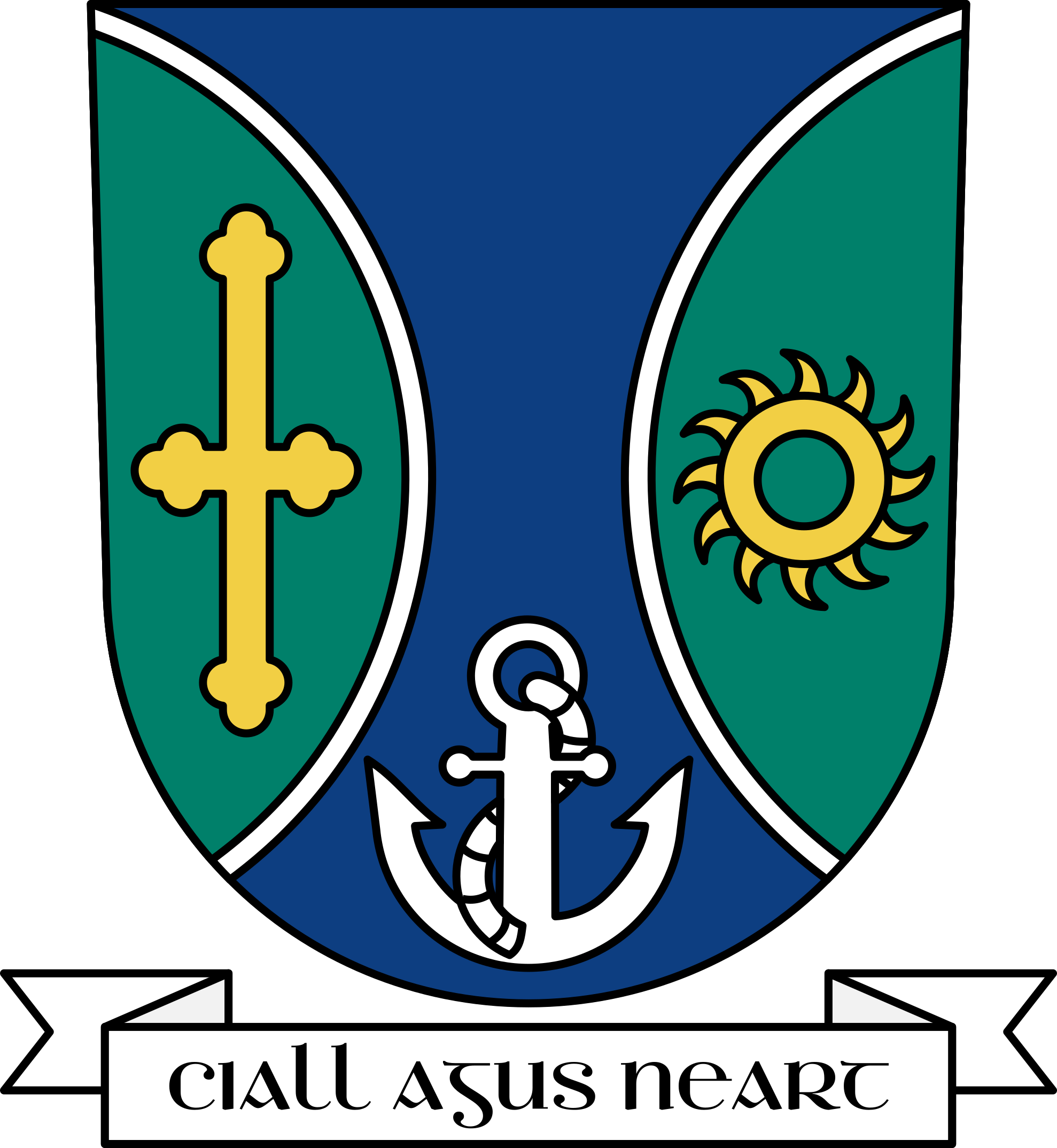
Kilrush, County Clare

Letterkenny, County Donegal

Limerick, County Limerick

Lisburn, County Antrim

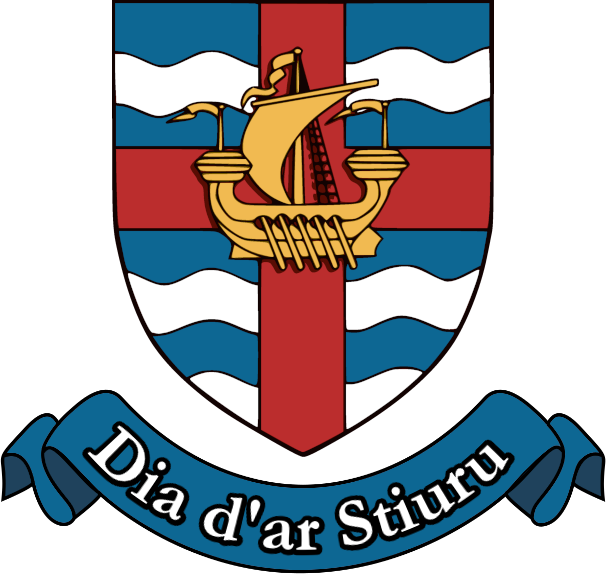
Loughrea, County Galway

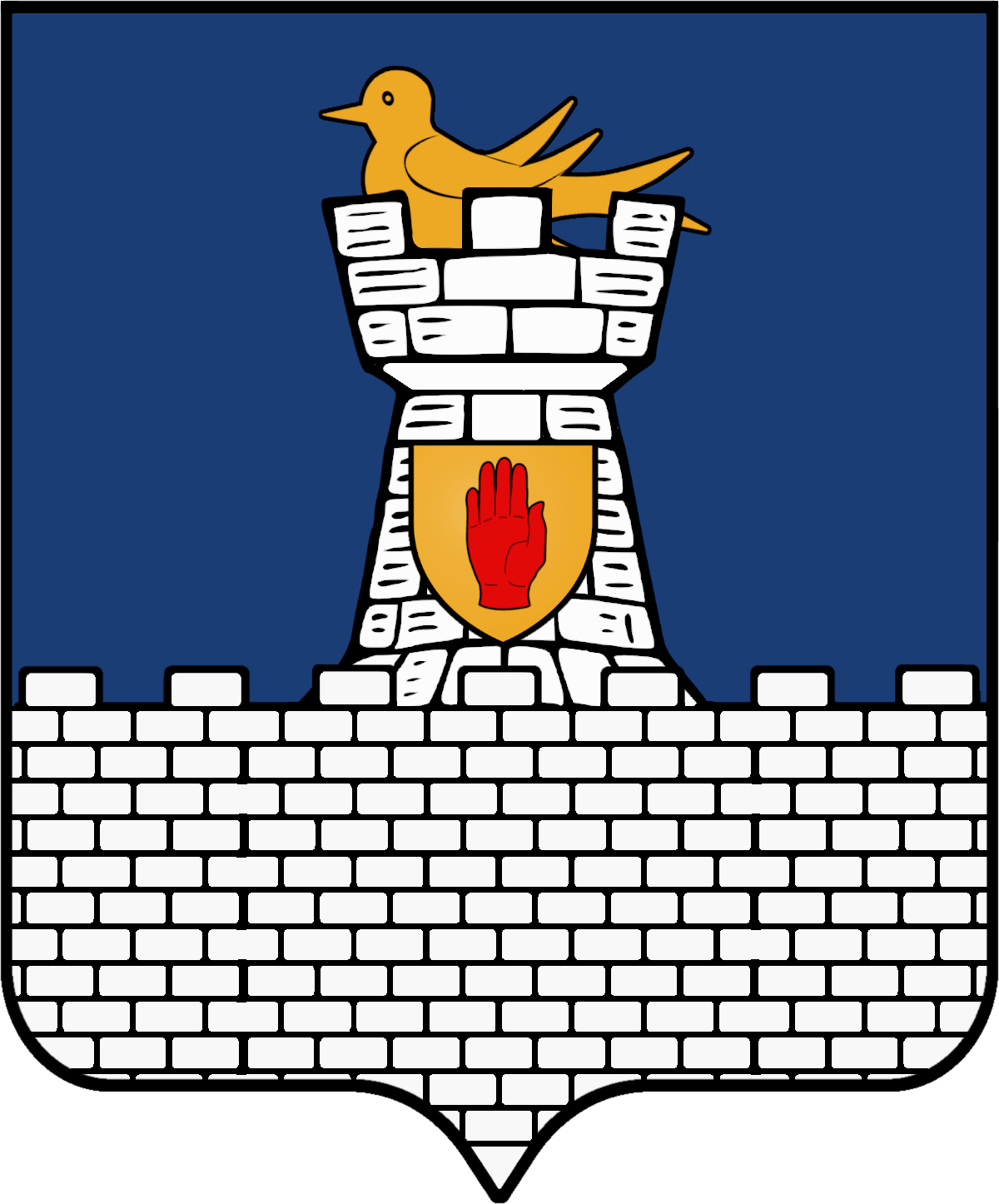
Monaghan, County Monaghan

Mountmellick, County Laois

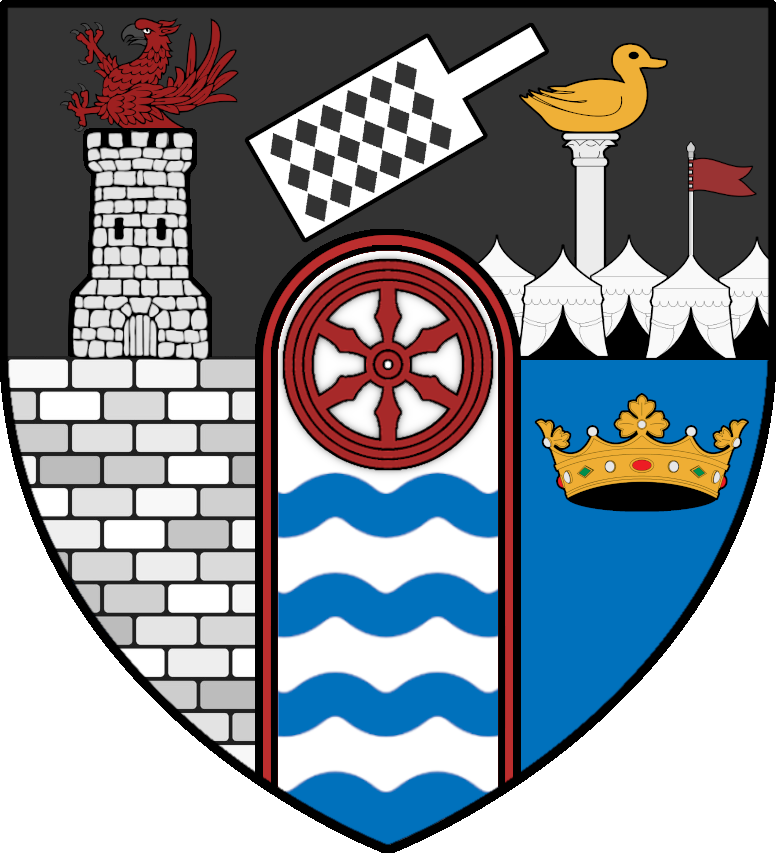
Mullingar, County Westmeath

Muine Bheag, County Carlow

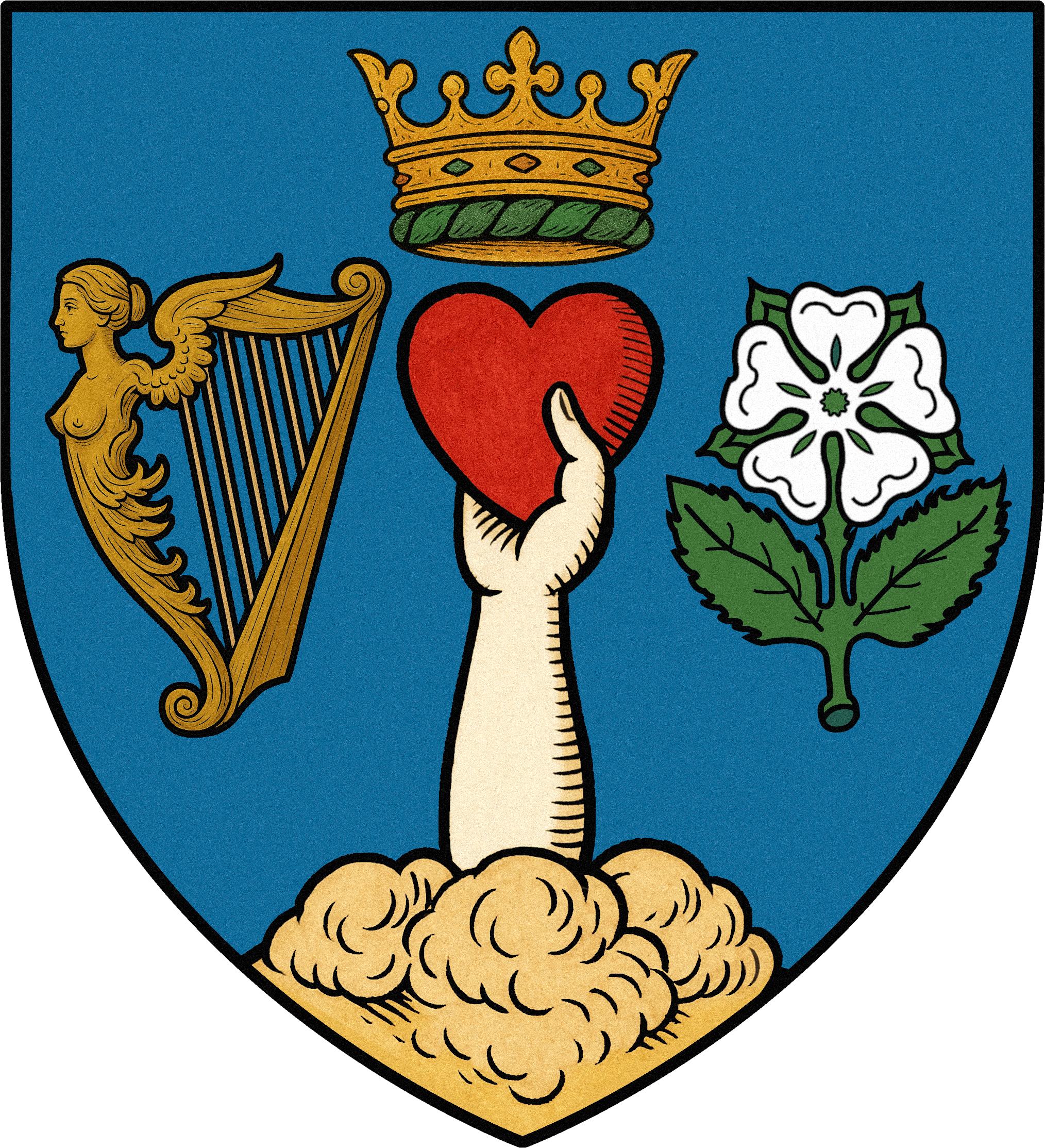
Navan, County Meath

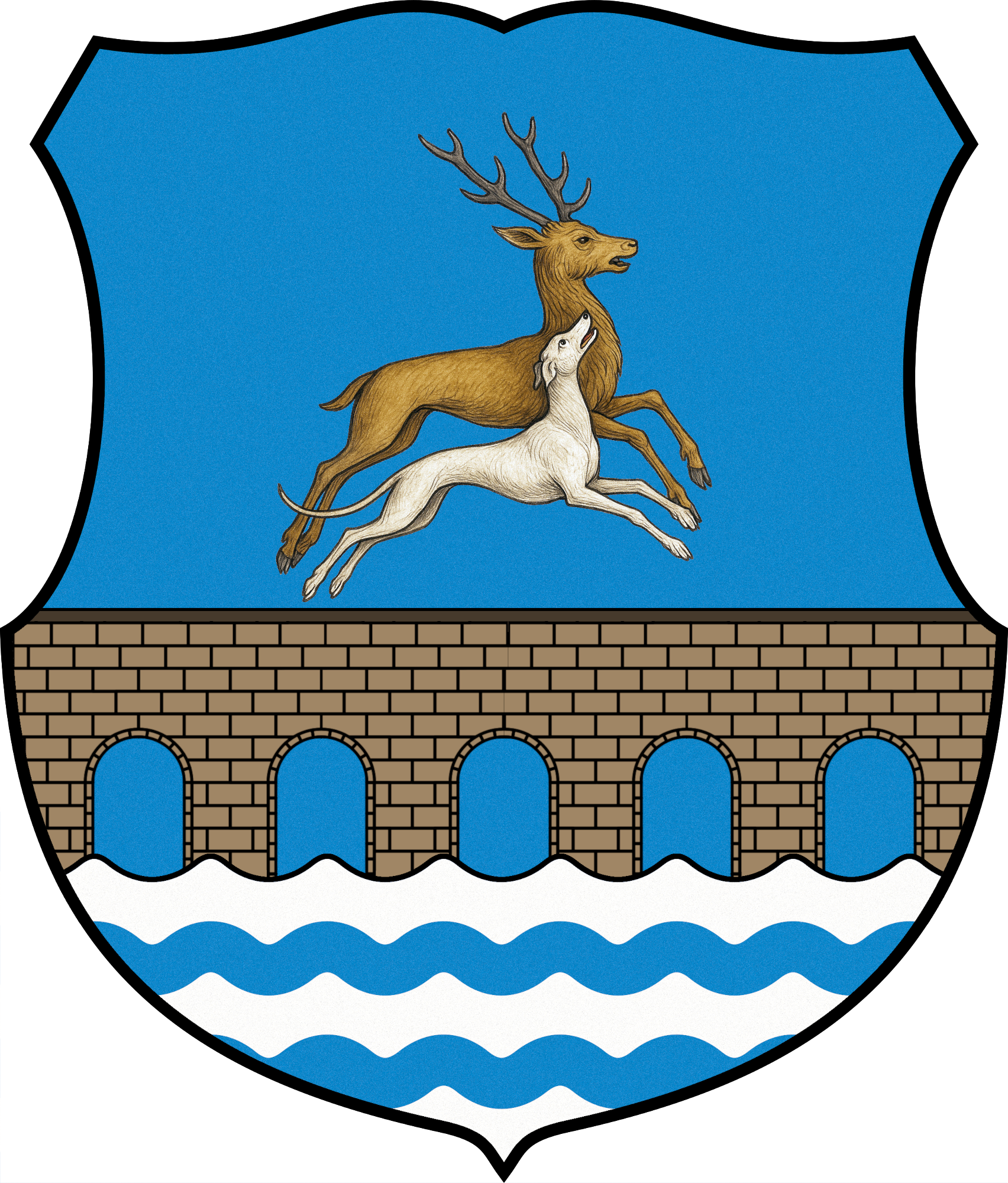
New Ross, County Wexford

Newry, County Down / County Armagh

Portlaoise, County Laois

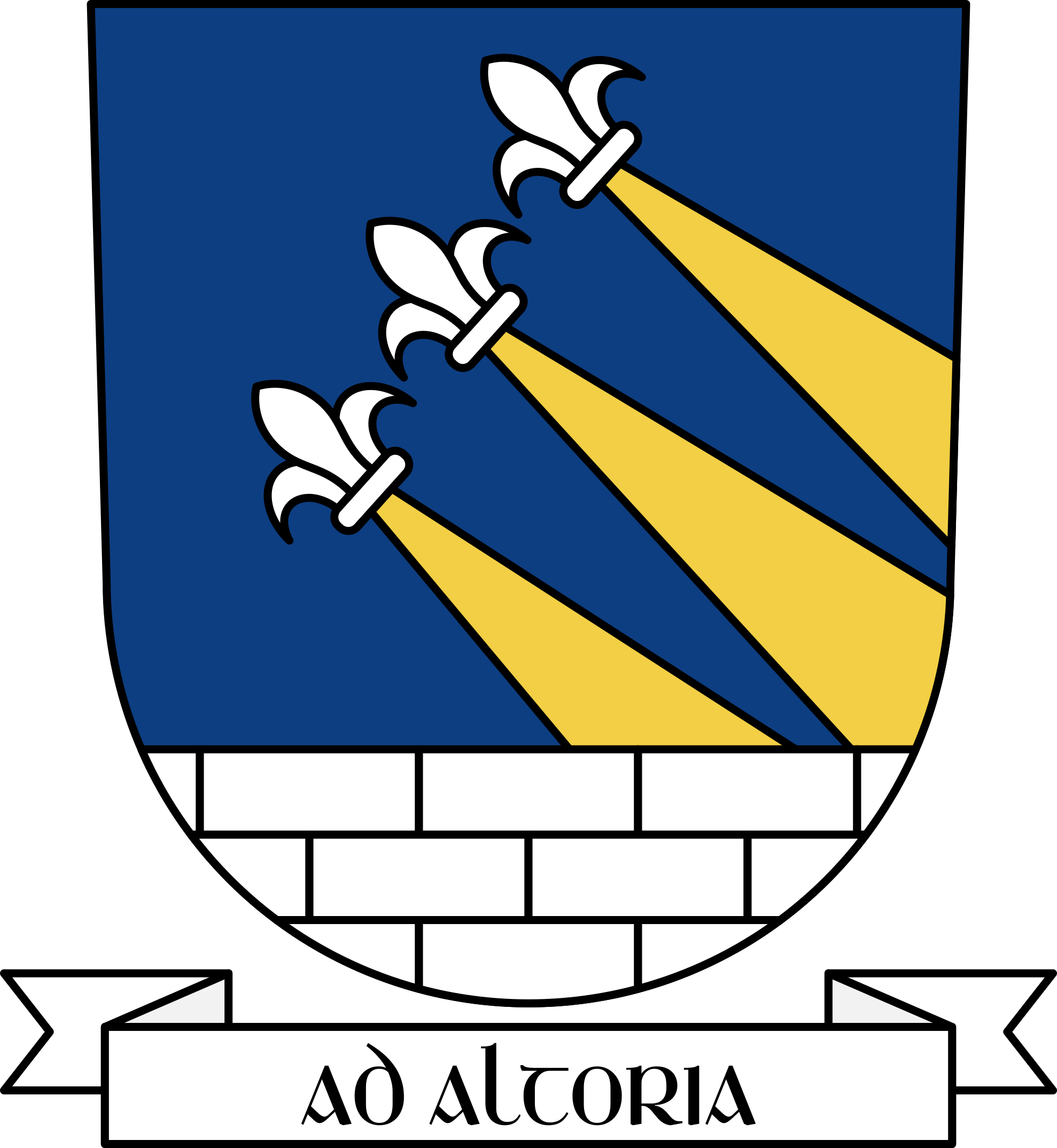
Shannon, County Clare

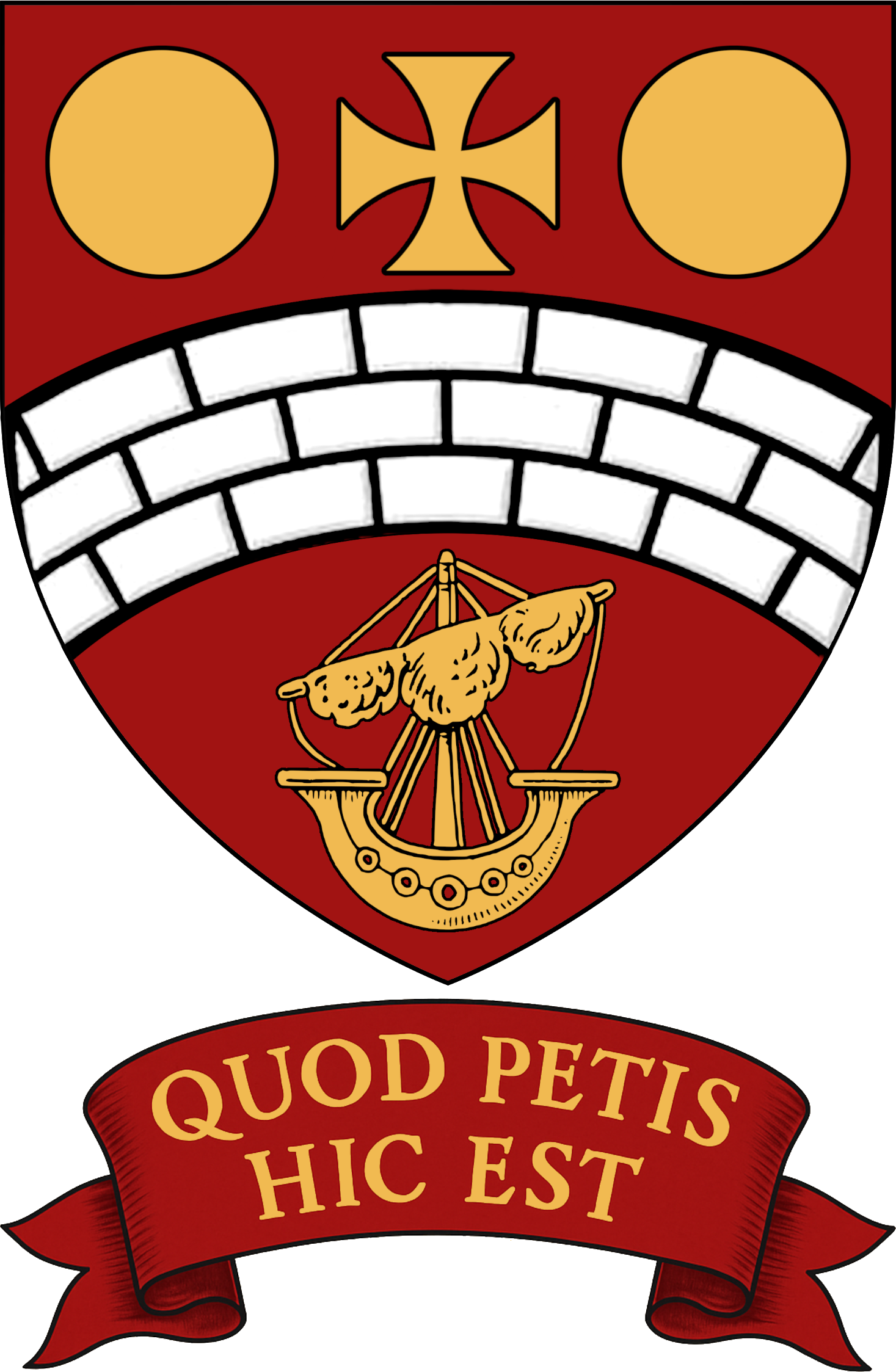
Skibbereen, County Cork

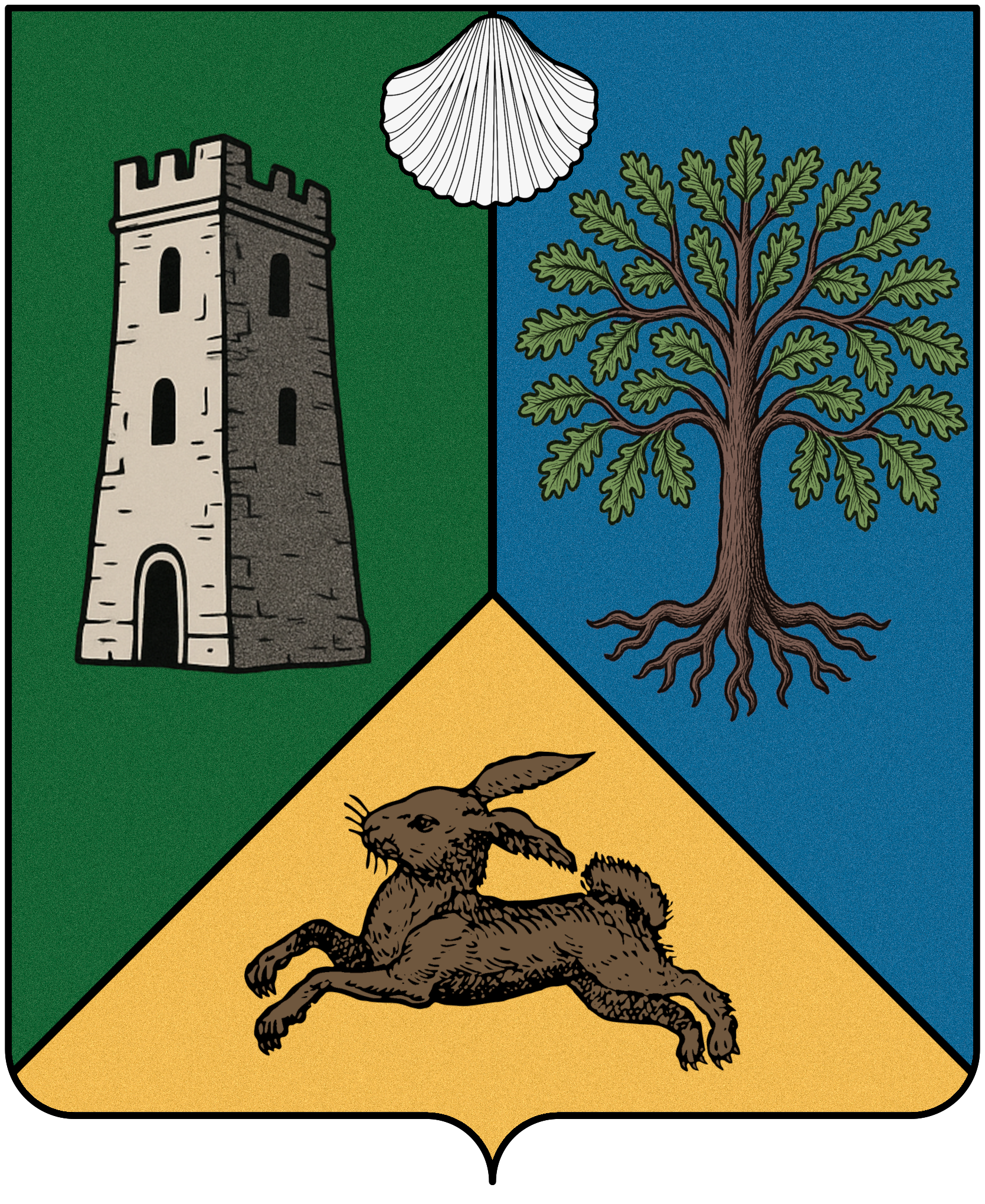
Sligo town, County Sligo

Tipperary Town, County Tipperary

Tramore, County Waterford

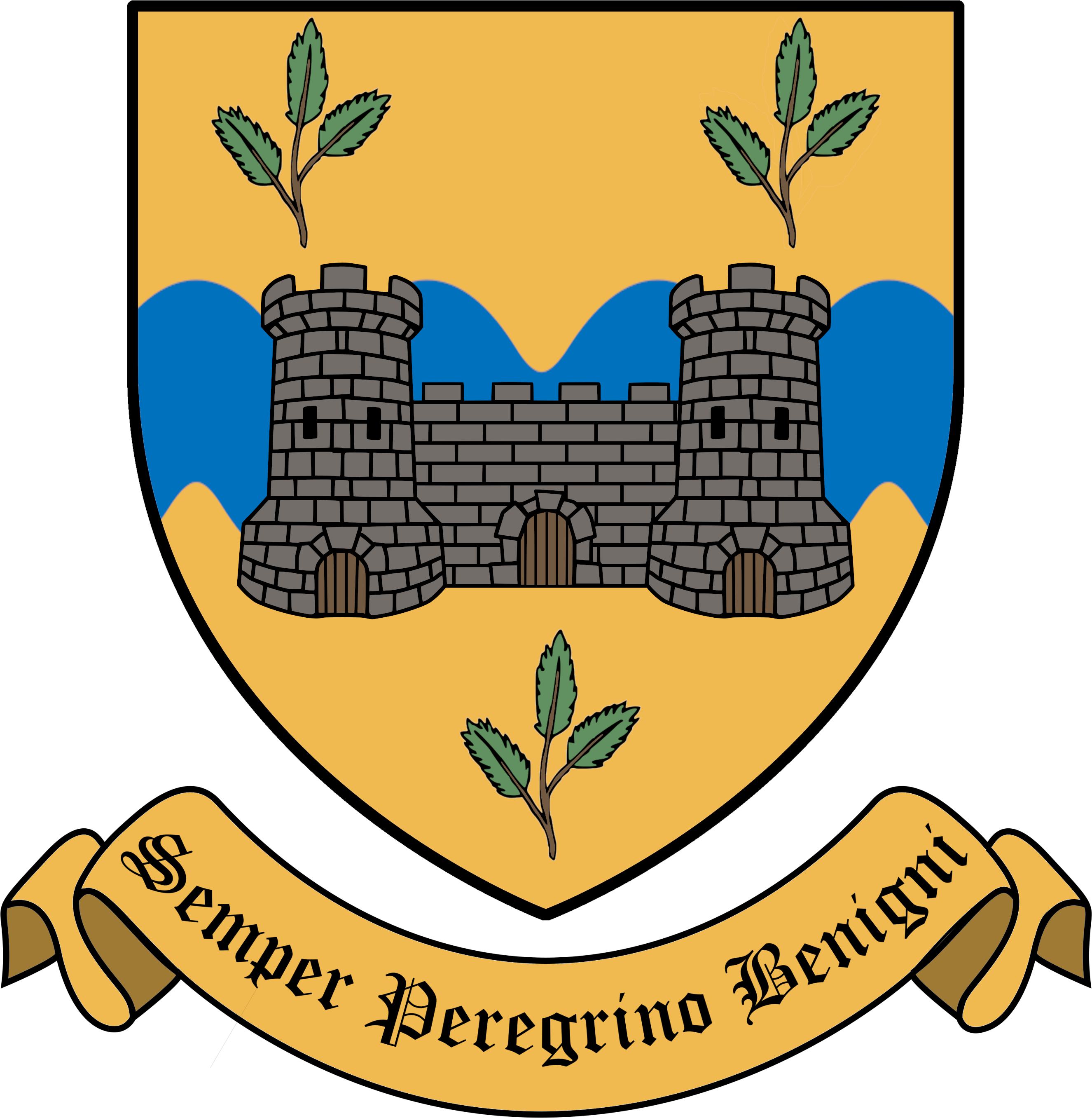
Trim, County Meath

Tralee, County Kerry

Tuam, County Galway

Tullamore, County Offaly

Waterford City, County Waterford

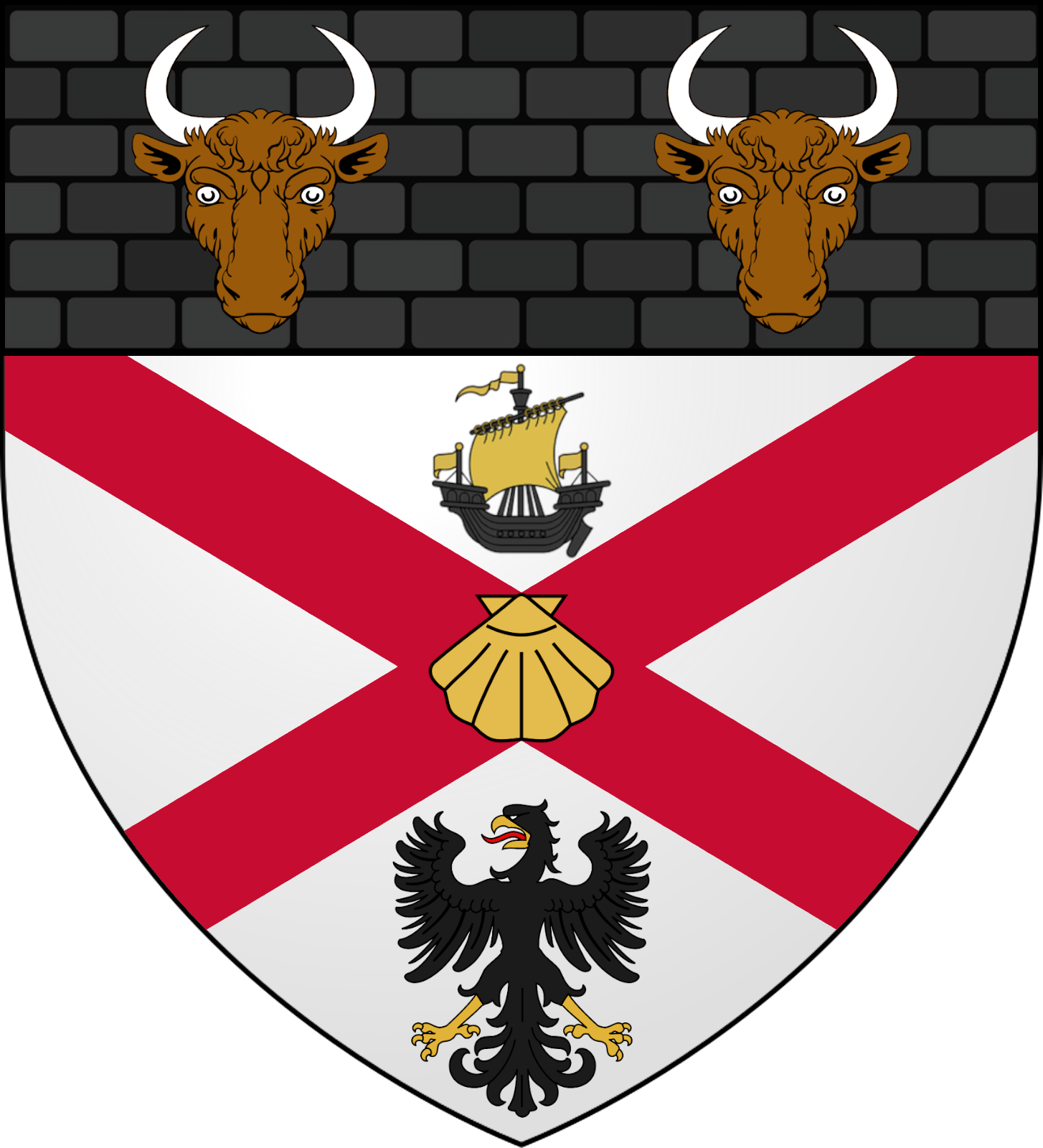
Westport, County Mayo

Wexford town, County Wexford

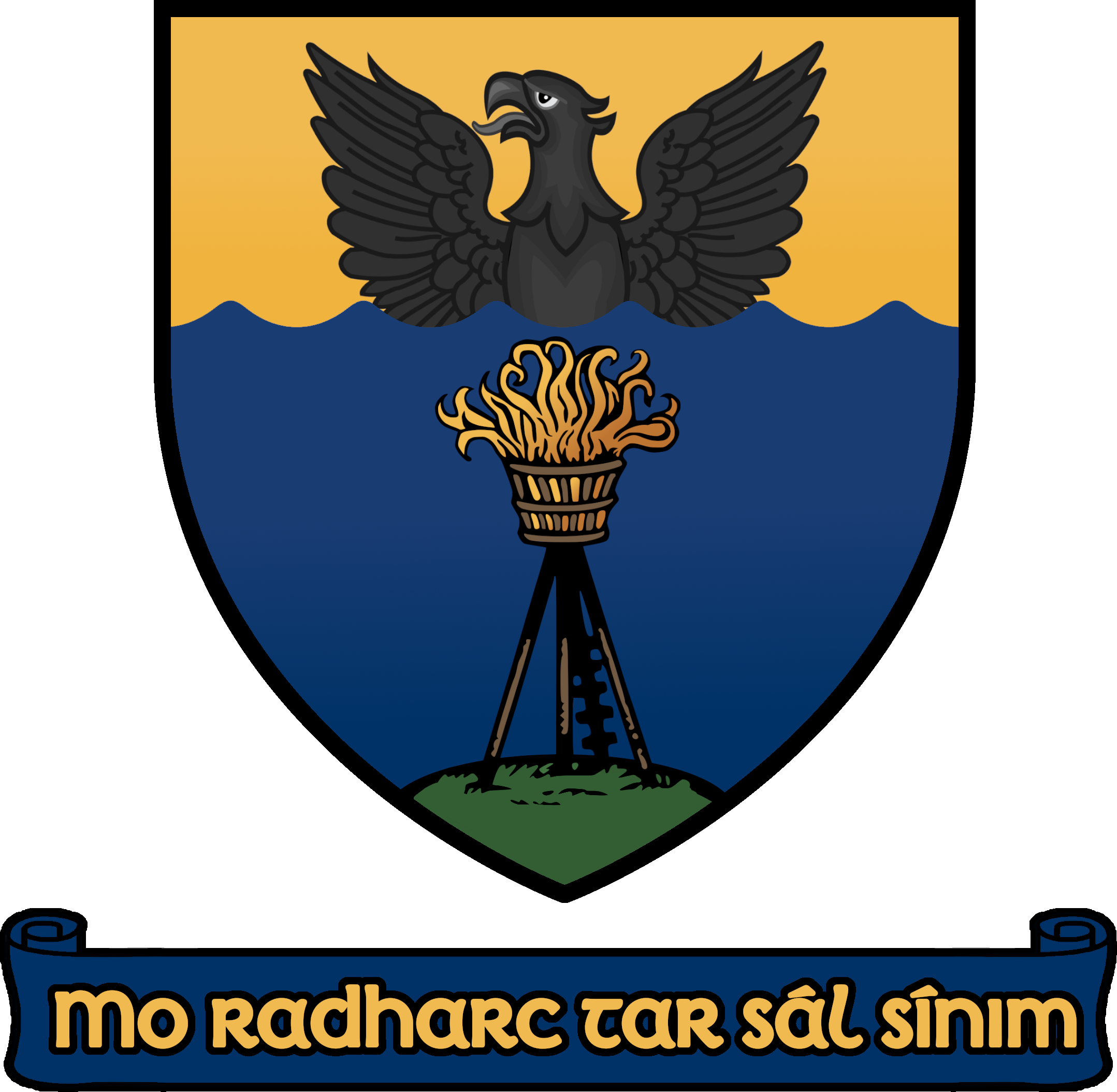
Wicklow, County Wicklow

== See also ==
- Coat of arms of Ireland
- Irish heraldry
- Cross-border flag for Ireland
