= St. Patrick's blue =

Colour associated with Ireland

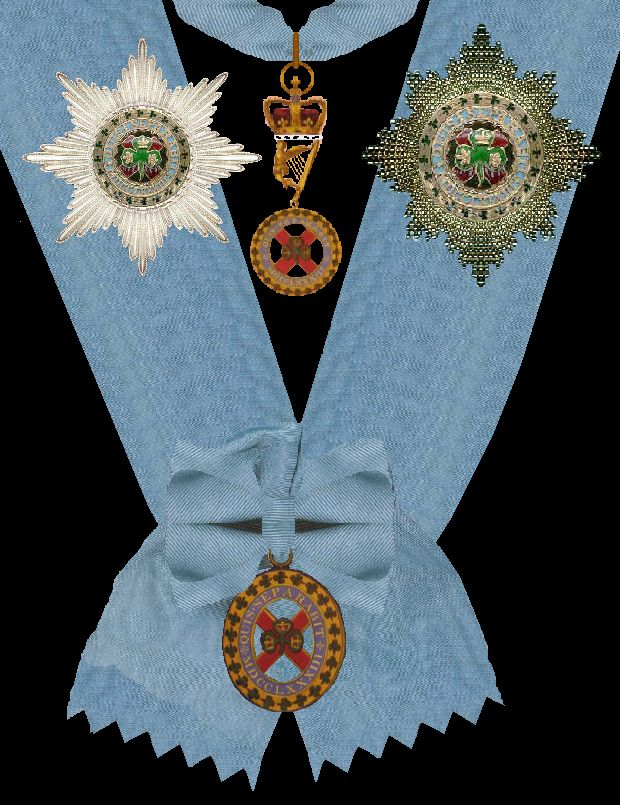
Sash of the Order of St Patrick

St Patrick's blue is a name often mistakenly applied to several shades of blue associated with Ireland. The official colour of Ireland in heraldic terms is azure blue. The colour blue's association with Saint Patrick dates from the 1780s, when it was adopted as the colour of the Anglo-Irish Order of St Patrick. The term refers to a sky blue used by the Order of St Patrick, often confused in Ireland with a darker, rich blue. There is no de jure national colour in Ireland, with the only reference to any colour(s) appearing in Article 7 of the Irish Constitution in regards to the national flag. However, while green is the de facto national colour of Ireland, representing Ireland in many sporting, cultural, and business events, azure blue is still found in symbols of both the state and the island.

== History ==
=== Origins ===
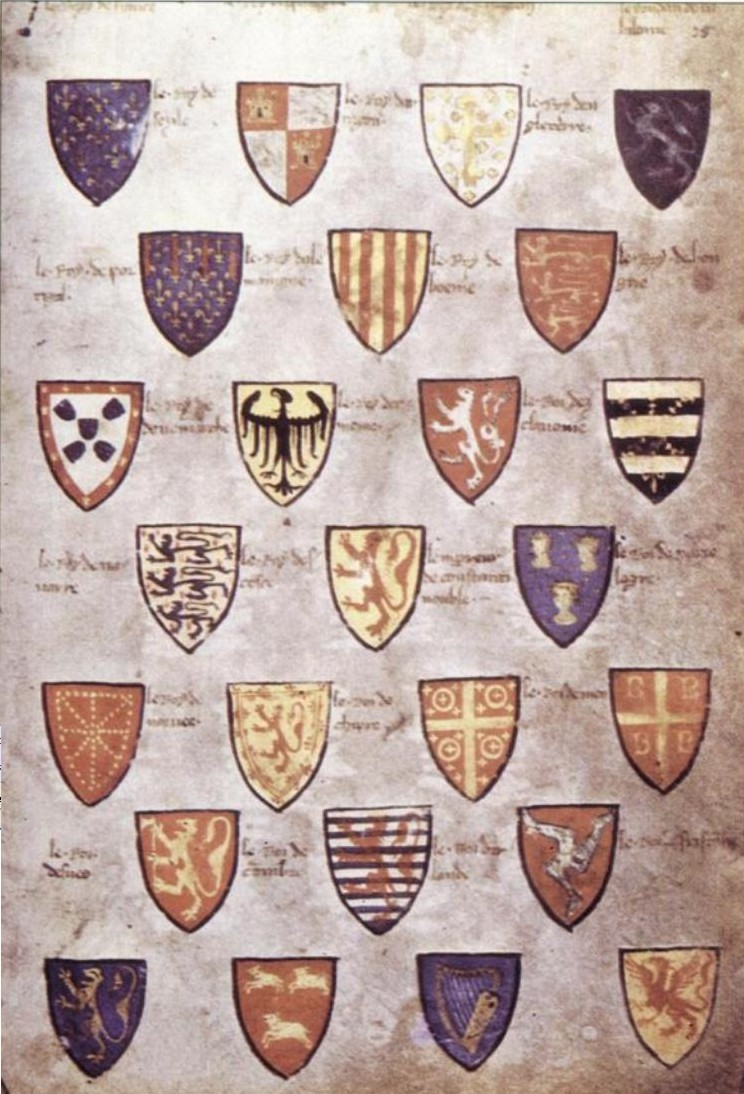
Armorial Wijnbergen. Showing arms for the kings, including Ireland.

The first record of blue as representing authority in Ireland appears in the late 13th century French roll of arms, known as the Armorial Wijnbergen. Within the document, a shield bearing a gold harp on a Blue field with the inscription Le Roi d'Irlande ("king of Ireland") written underneath is listed The Order of St Patrick was established in 1783 as the senior order of chivalry in the Kingdom of Ireland. The colour of its honours needed to differ from those of the Order of the Garter (dark blue) and the Order of the Thistle (green). Orange was considered, but the association with orangeism felt to be too sectarian, so the lighter blue was chosen. Knights and officers of the order wore a "sky blue" mantle and riband, a hat lined with "blue", and a badge ringed with "blue" enamel. The name St Patrick's blue was common but never officially used by the Order.

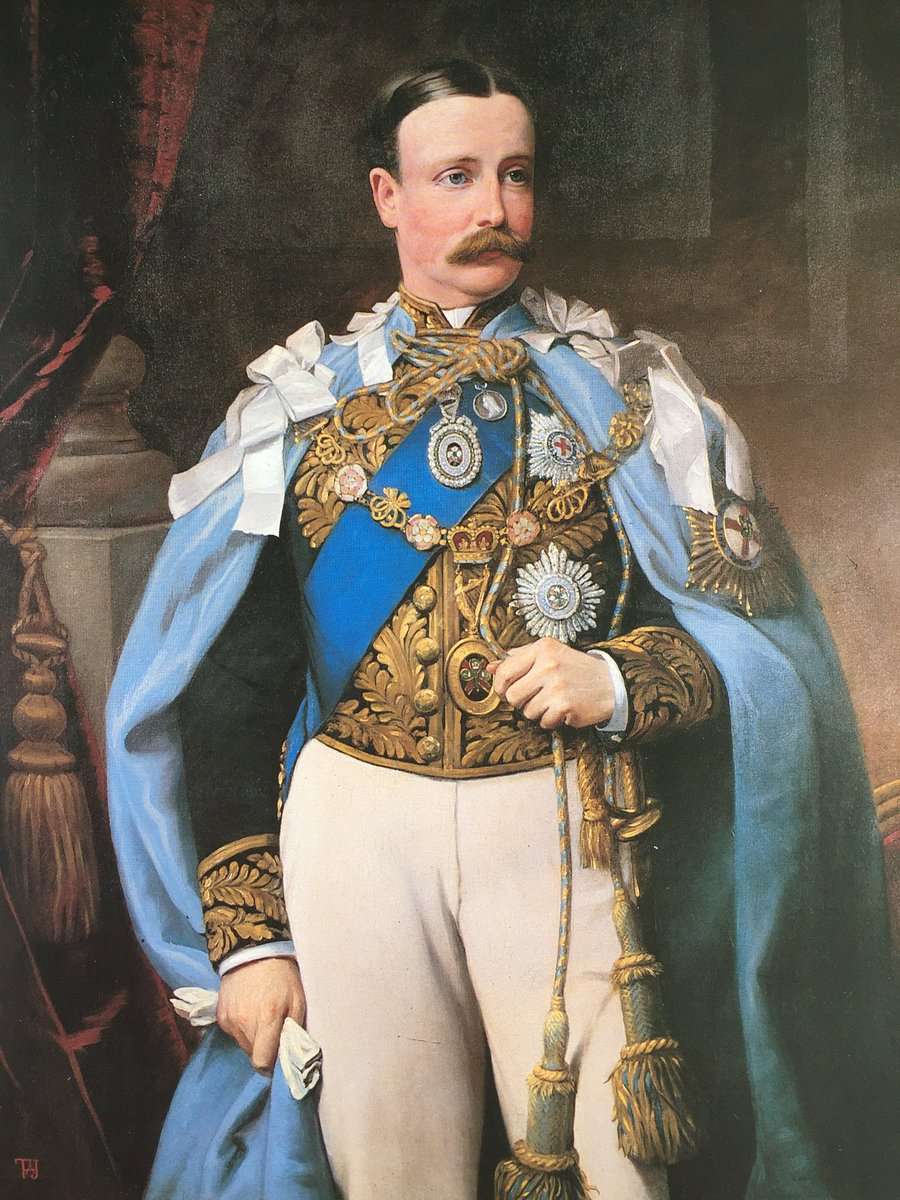
The 6th Marquess of Londonderry in the 1880s wearing the sky-blue mantle of the Order of St. Patrick and the darker blue sash of Order of the Garter.

The exact shade of blue used varied over time. A sky blue tinged with green was used by Lord Iveagh in 1895 and confirmed in 1903.

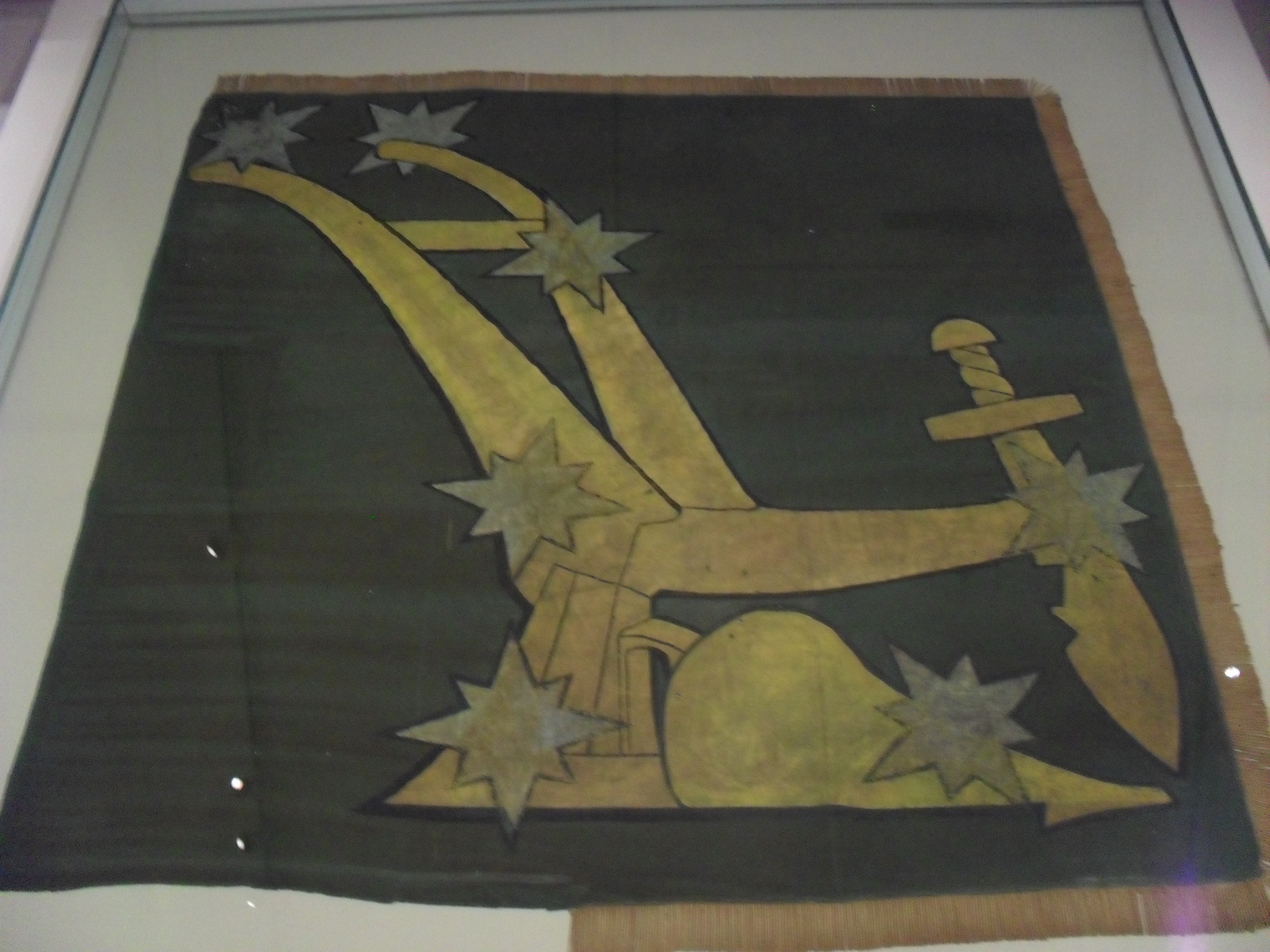
Original 1914 Starry Plough banner on display in National Museum, Collins Barracks, in Dublin

There has been debate over the extent to which blue was a national colour of Ireland prior to the creation of the Order, and whether it was associated with Saint Patrick himself independently of the Order. Jim Smyth characterised the Order's adoption of St Patrick's Blue and Saint Patrick's Saltire as examples of invention of tradition. Shane Leslie speculated that the green-blue of St Patrick's blue might be "but a reminiscence of the woad-stain used by all colour-loving Celts". Constance Gore-Booth believed blue was "the old colour of Ireland" and incorporated it in the regalia of the Irish Citizen Army (ICA). Scientific analysis of the ICA banner, the Starry Plough, found it had originally been a rich deep poplin field of blue before being replaced with green in advance of being flown over the Imperial Hotel during the 1916 Easter Rising. Antiquarian nationalist Francis Joseph Bigger considered St Patrick's blue a "fake colour" and Saint Patrick's Flag a "fake flag". More recently, Peter Alter and Christina Mahony have supported the historicity of the colour, while Brian Ó Cuív questioned it.

Historic arms of the Kingdom of Ireland

The Irish arms used by Irish monarchs since Edward IV had an azure field; originally the device was three crowns (now the arms of Munster) until Henry VIII changed it to a harp. This is still the arms of the modern Irish state, and also appears in the lower left quarter of the Royal Standard of the United Kingdom. In Irish mythology, Flaitheas Éireann, the sovereignty of Ireland, was sometimes represented as a woman in a blue robe. Although the arms of the province of Mide has a blue field, when its device was used as the arms of Ireland, the field was sable. The Irish College in Paris, completed in 1776, was renovated in 2002; the paint uncovered on the chapel walls was described as "St Patrick's blue" by a visiting journalist. As regards green in association with Patrick: in 1681, Thomas Dineley reported people wearing crosses of green ribbon in their hats on Saint Patrick's Day.

=== Former use ===
At a "National Ball" during Edward, Prince of Wales' 1868 visit to Ireland, his wife Alexandra wore a dress of "St Patrick blue". In 1886, a garden party given by the Lord Lieutenant of Ireland to showcase Irish manufacturing had an Irish-themed dress code. The Freeman's Journal criticised some of the code as difficult to comply with, but said 'Irish poplin ties of "St Patrick's Blue"—which we think looks rather green in a certain light—may [...] be had without much strain.' The Guardian's report of the party stated 'the display of the new colour, "St. Patrick's Blue," was everywhere visible.' The 1912 court uniform and dress code specified that the household of the Lord Lieutenant of Ireland should wear St Patrick's blue, as should Pages of Honour when the King was in Ireland.

The Ireland association football team organised by the Irish Football Association (IFA) wore St Patrick's blue jerseys from 1882 until 1931, when they switched to green. The IFA team is now the Northern Ireland team. The Football Association of Ireland sent an Irish Free State team to the 1924 Olympic football tournament; it wore a St Patrick's Blue change strip against Bulgaria, whose strip was Ireland's usual green. In 2021, the Republic of Ireland wore a St. Patrick's Blue jersey in a friendly against Qatar for the 100th anniversary of the FAI.

In the 1930s, the Army Comrades Association's Saint Patrick's blue shirts earned it the nickname of Blueshirts. It was a quasi-Fascist shirted movement which rejected green as associated with its republican opponents. The saltire flag of the Blueshirts was a variant of Saint Patrick's Flag with the white background replaced with a blue background. W. T. Cosgrave described the colour as "in perfect, traditional, national accord with our history and in close association with the most revered and venerated memory of our patron Saint".

The Irish Army Band's first uniform was St Patrick's blue, but this was soon changed to navy. The Mounted Escort ceremonial cavalry of 1932–48 were nicknamed "Blue Hussars" from their uniforms, whose colour was sometimes described as St Patrick's blue. The uniform introduced in 1970 for Aer Lingus air hostesses and ground crew combined green and St Patrick's Blue, described in The Irish Times as "a sparkling new colour". The 1970 uniform was replaced in 1975, after a design consultancy developed a common corporate image with a colour scheme of dark bottle green, bright green, and "a strong blue".

== Modern use ==
The Irish presidential standard

The coat of arms of Ireland and the standard of the president of Ireland are a gold (or) Irish harp with silver (argent) strings on a field of blue (azure). The standard was introduced at the end of Douglas Hyde's term in 1945; contemporary news reports describe the blue as "St. Patrick's Blue". The arms were granted by the Chief Herald of Ireland on 9 November 1945. Horses owned by the Irish National Stud are regarded as owned by the president and entitled to run in the presidential colours. The racing colours are "Saint Patrick's blue with gold sleeves, and a St Patrick's blue cap with gold tassel". One such horse is Suailce, which won the 2008 Irish Cesarewich. The blue in the ribbon of the service medals of the Irish Defence Forces is described as "St. Patrick’s blue".

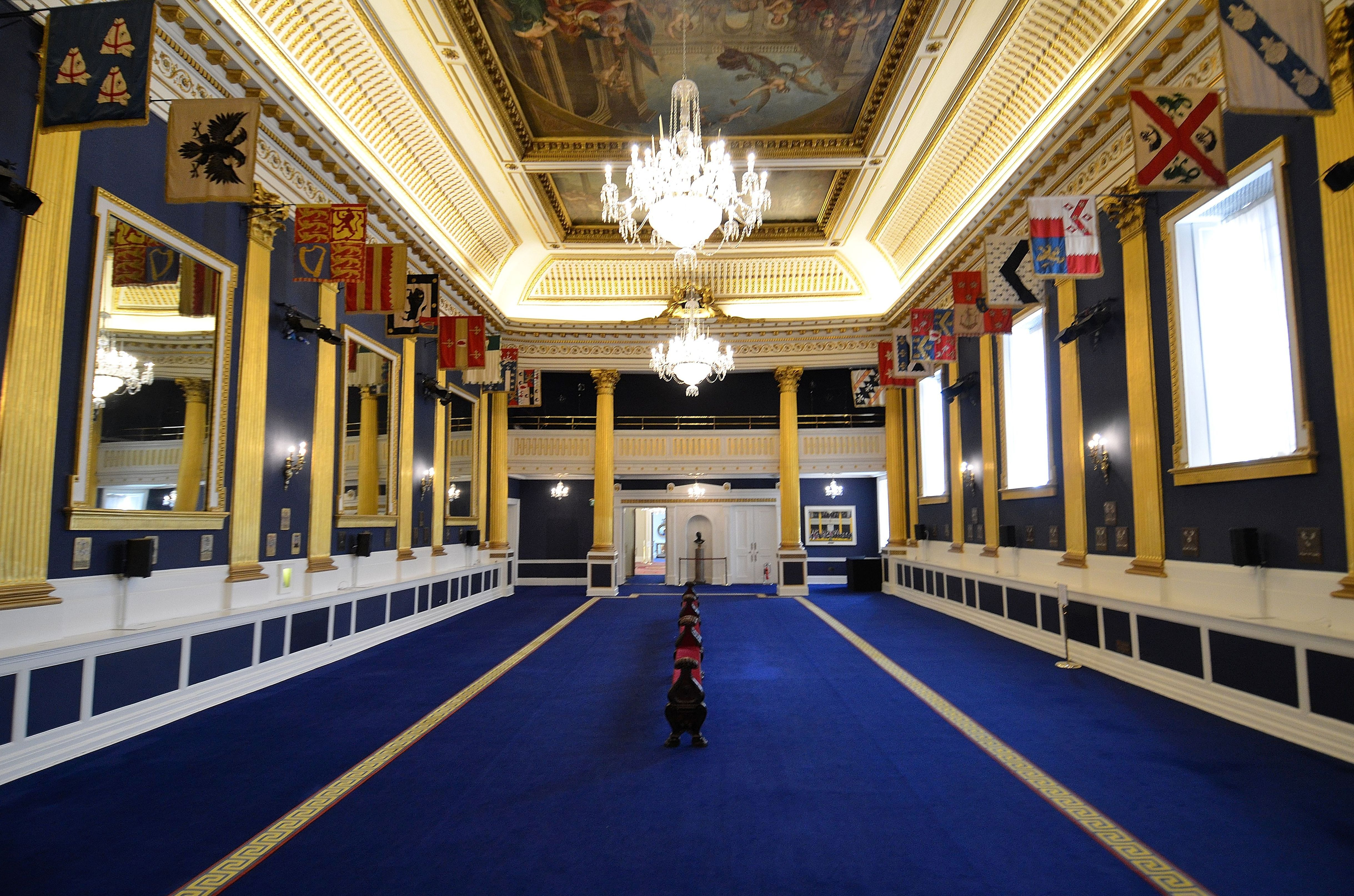
St Patrick's Hall, Dublin Castle. Home of the Order of St Patrick, now used for presidential inaugurations.

The official sporting colours of University College Dublin are "St. Patrick's Blue and Saffron", adopted in 1910. The blue is commonly interpreted as 'light', 'Leinster or 'Dublin' blue; the GAA county colours of County Dublin include light blue jerseys. In the National University of Ireland's academic dress code, "Saint Patrick's Blue" is the colour of the faculty of Science; Veterinary Medicine has a darker "Celtic Blue". The academical dress of Queen's University Belfast and the Royal College of Surgeons of Ireland also features St Patrick's blue. The Trinity College Dublin fencing club specifies that the azure in its colours is "St. Patrick's Blue (Pantone 295 as the Presedential [sic] Pennant)".

Among Irish regiments of the British Army, a hackle of St Patrick's blue is worn in the bearskins of the Irish Guards and in the caubeens of the London Irish Rifles. The Guards' blue was chosen in distinction to the Royal Irish Fusiliers' green hackle. St Patrick's Cathedral, Dublin commemorates its historic association with the Order of Saint Patrick with St Patrick's blue on the cassocks of the choristers and under the clerical collars of the dean and the vicar.

A cross-border flag for Ireland may be required where a sporting team combines athletes from both the Republic of Ireland and Northern Ireland. The arms of the four provinces of Ireland on a background of Saint Patrick's blue has sometimes served this purpose.

== See also ==
- Saint Patrick's Flag
