= Coat of arms of Ireland =

- Armiger: Ireland
- Adopted: 1945 (registered: Arms of Ireland); c. 1541 (recorded: Kingdom of Ireland); c. 1280 (recorded: King of Ireland)
- Shield: Azure a harp Or, stringed argent (Irish: Cláirseach órga le sreanga airgid ar ghorm)
- Earlier version

The coat of arms of Ireland is blazoned as Azure a harp Or, stringed Argent (a gold harp with silver strings on a blue background). These arms have long been Ireland's heraldic emblem. References to them as being the arms of the king of Ireland can be found as early as the 13th century. These arms were adopted by Henry VIII of England when he ended the period of Lordship of Ireland and declared Ireland to be a kingdom again in 1541. When the crowns of England, Scotland and Ireland were united in 1603, they were integrated into the unified royal coat of arms of kingdoms of England, Scotland and Ireland. The harp was adopted as the emblem of the Irish Free State when it separated from the United Kingdom in 1922. They were registered as the arms of Ireland with the Chief Herald of Ireland on 9 November 1945.

The depiction of the harp has changed over time. When the arms were restored as the arms of the independent Irish state in 1922, a late-medieval Gaelic harp (a cláirseach), the Trinity College Harp, was used as a model.

Several variants of the arms of Ireland exist, including a heraldic badge and an infrequently used crest and torse. The Lordship of Ireland, the medieval realm of Ireland that existed between 1171 and 1541 under the English crown, had a separate arms, which are blazoned Azure, three crowns in pale Or, bordure Argent (three golden crowns ordered vertically on a blue background with a white border). A variant of the arms of the ancient royal province of Meath were also apparently used at one time as the arms of Ireland.

== Description ==
The design of the harp used by the modern Irish state is based on the Brian Boru harp, a late-medieval Gaelic harp now in Trinity College Dublin. (Note: The Trinity College Harp was once thought to have belonged to Brian Boru, the 11th century High King of Ireland. However, the harp has since been dated to the 14th or 15th century and so cannot have actually belonged to him. It is on permanent display in the Long Room of the library of Trinity College Dublin) The design is by an English sculptor, Percy Metcalfe. Metcalfe's design was in response to a competition held by the state to design Irish coinage, which was to start circulation in December 1928. Metcalfe's design became the model for future official interpretations of the harp as an emblem of the state.

The modern design is markedly different from earlier depictions. During the 17th century, it became common to depict the harp with a woman's head and breasts, like a ship's figurehead, as the pillar. It is not necessary to show a full complement of thirty strings, provided that the numbers do not fall below nine. The strings are always silver and the harp is always gold.

The harp is shown on a blue background termed Azure in heraldic use. The colour was first chosen by French heralds in the Armorial Wijnbergen, created in modern-day France between 1260 and 1285, with azure retained as the oldest heraldic choice to denote Ireland. This is sometimes misattributed to 'St. Patrick's blue' but there is no connection. The use of blue in the arms has also been associated with Gormfhlaith, a Gaelic mythological personification of Ireland. The word Gormfhlaith is a compound of the Irish words gorm ("blue") and flaith ("sovereign"); it is noted in early Irish texts as the name of several queens closely connected with dynastic politics in the 10th and 11th century Ireland. The National Library of Ireland, in describing the blue background of the arms, notes that in early Irish mythology the sovereignty of Ireland (Irish: Flaitheas Éireann) was represented by a woman often dressed in a blue robe.

It is sometimes claimed that Ireland is the only nation whose national symbol is a musical instrument, but this is not strictly accurate: the kundu drum is the symbol of Papua New Guinea, the karyenda drum formerly appeared on the flag and arms of Burundi, and the arms of Trinidad and Tobago depict the steelpan.

== Usage ==
Today, the image of the harp is used on the coins, passports and official seals of Ireland and is incorporated into the emblems of many bodies in Northern Ireland, such as the Police Service of Northern Ireland. The harp is frequently incorporated into the emblems of Irish companies, such as Guinness and Ryanair. It appears on the arms of countries with historical links to Ireland or the United Kingdom, such as Montserrat and Canada. In 1984, exemplars of the modern design, approved by the Chief Herald, were registered by the Government of Ireland with the World Intellectual Property Organization under Article 6ter of the Paris Convention, which relates to state emblems. The government only registered "left-facing" images, with the harp's sound board on the right. While the Attorney General's office felt that right-facing images should also be registered, patent agents advised this might be interfere with Guinness Brewery's use of such harps in its logo since the 1870s.

=== Presidential standard ===
Presidential standard of Ireland

As well as being the arms of Ireland, since 1945 the harp is the arms of each president of Ireland whilst in office. Typically, the arms are borne as a banner in the form of a presidential standard. The standard is flown over Áras an Uachtaráin, the president's residence in Dublin, at Dublin Castle, when the president is in residence and on vehicles used by the president. Like other presidential and royal standards, it is never flown at half mast. However, the Presidential Standard never takes precedence over the flag of Ireland, whereas, for example, the Royal Standard of the United Kingdom takes precedence over the flag of the United Kingdom.

== History ==
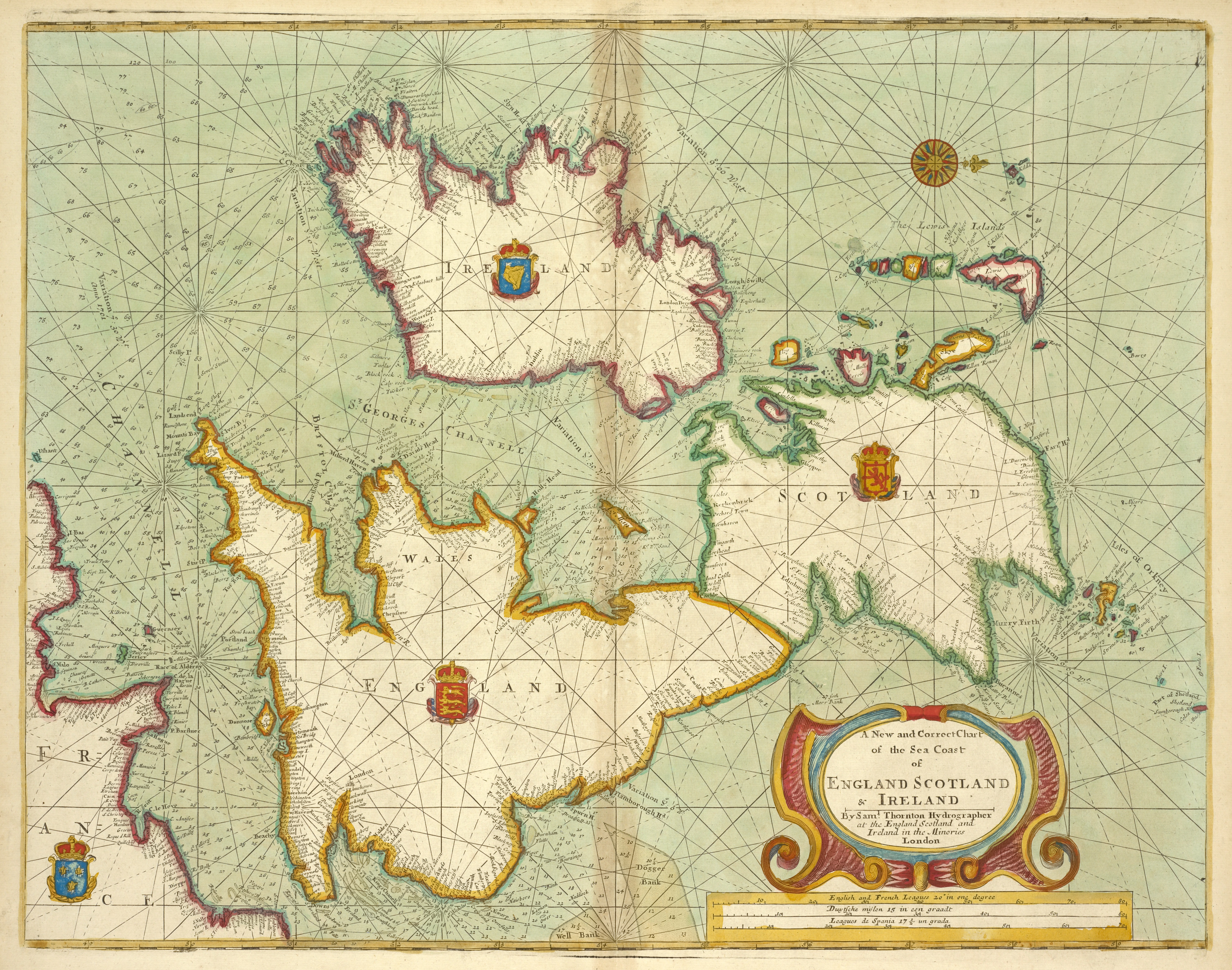
1702 map of Great Britain and Ireland with the arms of Ireland, England, Scotland and France. The harp has a woman's head and breasts.

As heraldry is essentially a feudal art, it was not until the Norman invasion of Ireland in 1169 that Irish coats of arms came into being, several decades after the art began to take seed in England and continental Europe. The earliest reference to a herald of arms for Ireland was in 1392 on the creation of the first Ireland King of Arms. The Ireland King of Arms, which was under the English College of Arms, was succeeded by an independent Ulster King of Arms, and an Athlone Pursuivant, in 1552, which despite its name had jurisdiction for arms over all of Ireland. In 1943, the Ulster King of Arms was merged with the Norroy King of Arms in England to form the Norroy and Ulster King of Arms. The office of the Chief Herald of Ireland was created as successor to the Ulster King of Arms and the arms of Ireland were registered by the Chief Herald of Ireland on 9 November 1945.

However, reference to the harp as the arms of the king of Ireland can be found in one of the oldest medieval rolls of arms. The Wijnbergen Roll, a French roll of arms dating from c. 1280 and preserved in The Hague, Netherlands, attributed "D'azure a la harpe d'or" (English: Blue with a harp of gold) to the King of Ireland ("le Roi d'Irlande"). The harp, traditionally associated with the biblical King David, was a rare charge on medieval rolls and only two arms with a harp are listed in a collection of 19 early rolls. Triangular devices appeared on medieval Irish coinage by kings John and Edward I in the 12th and 13th centuries. These devices may have been crude harps or it may be that the harp developed from the use of triangles to distinguish Irish coins. The idea of a harp being the arms of Ireland may have originated as a reference to a fictional character, le roi d'irelande, in the courtly legend cycle of Tristan. Alternatively, it may have derived from a celebrated 13th century bardic poem, Tabhroidh Chugam Cruit mo Riogh, dedicated to Donnchadh Cairbreach O'Briain (d. 1242), a Gaelic King of Thomond.

Whatever its origins, the harp was adopted as the symbol of the new Kingdom of Ireland, established by Henry VIII, in 1541. A document in the Office of the Ulster King of Arms, from either the late reign of Henry VIII or the early reign his son of Edward VI, states that they were the arms of the kingdom of Ireland. The arms were incorporated into the unified Royal Coats of Arms of England, Ireland and Scotland upon the Union of the Crowns of the three kingdoms in 1603. Upon the secession of the Irish Free State from the United Kingdom in 1922, the harp was taken as the emblem of the independent Irish state.

=== Previous arms ===
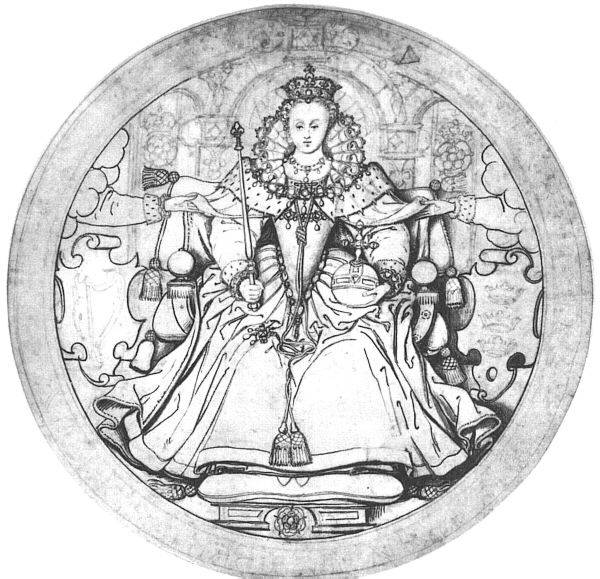
Unused sketch by Nicholas Hilliard for a Great Seal of Ireland. Escutcheons beside Elizabeth I show the harp (left) and three crowns (right), successive arms of Ireland.

The Lordship of Ireland, the medieval realm of Ireland that existed between 1171 and 1541 under the English crown, had separate arms. A commission of Edward IV in c. 1467–8 into the arms of Ireland found them to be blazoned Azure, three crowns in pale Or, bordure Argent (three golden crowns ordered vertically on a blue background with a white border). The association of these arms with Ireland is likely to have originated with Irish magnates (both Norman and Gaelic) who fought in Edward I's Scottish wars at the turn of the 14th century. These were the arms of Edmund the Martyr, which the Irish lords adopted as their banner in the same way as English lords identified with the banner of Saint George. However, these arms were also well known in other medieval contexts and are often attributed to King Arthur.

It is believed that the three crowns were abandoned as the arms of Ireland after Henry VIII's split with the Papacy. Strictly speaking, following the Norman invasion of the 12th century, Ireland was a feudal possession of the Pope under the overlordship of the English monarch. The decision to change the three crowns arms may have sprung "from an idea that they might denote the feudal sovereignty of the pope" — whose tiara has three crowns — "whose vassal the king of England was, as lord of Ireland."

Despite this, the memory of the three crowns arms may have remained for a time with one Elizabethan variant of the harp, sometimes found on coins, maps and seals as early as 1562, using of the three harps, one replacing each of the three crowns of the lordship's arms. This appears to have been a creation of the newly established Ulster King of Arms and never captured the popular imagination sufficiently to replace the single Harp arms that was in use from the reign of Henry VIII. Thus, at the funeral cortège of Elizabeth I in 1603 depicted in a manuscript at the British Library, the Earl of Clanrickarde is shown carrying the banner of Ireland just as in the Wijnbergen Roll.

A variant of arms of the royal province of Meath were also apparently used at one time as the arms of Ireland. Meath, now a part of the province of Leinster was once the province of the High Kings of Ireland. Its arms are of a king sitting on a throne on a blue field. The variant apparently used as the arms of Ireland were of a majesty on a sable (black) background instead of an azure (blue) field.

Arms of the Kingdom of Ireland

Arms of the Lordship of Ireland

Arms of the royal province of Meath

== Achievement ==
The armorial achievement of the Kingdom of Ireland, including the infrequently used crest

A crest, which was little used, is thought to have been created for the ascension of James I. This crest was blazoned: A tower triple towered or, from the portal a hart springing argent, attired and unguled also or. The torse was Or and azure. The torse and crest were apparently little used even during the period of the Kingdom of Ireland. Unlike Scotland, Ireland did not reserve the right to bear a distinct coat of arms within the United Kingdom. The crest and torse are not employed by the Irish state today.

Historically, the harp was frequently seen surmounted by a crown. In this case, the depiction is as heraldic badge, a device used to indicate allegiance to or the property of someone or something. Elizabeth I used the badge as her second Great Seal of 1586. This motif had earlier featured of the coins of the Lordship of Ireland during the Tudor period and continued to be used on the coins of the Kingdom of Ireland. Following the creation of the United Kingdom, the device was used on the cap badges of the Royal Irish Constabulary and later the Royal Ulster Constabulary. The badge can be seen today on the cap badge of the Royal Irish Regiment of the British Army. The harp, unsurmounted by a crown, is used as a badge in Ireland today, but the harp surmounted by a crown is also found (e.g. in 'colours' ties of Trinity College sports teams).

=== Supporters and motto ===
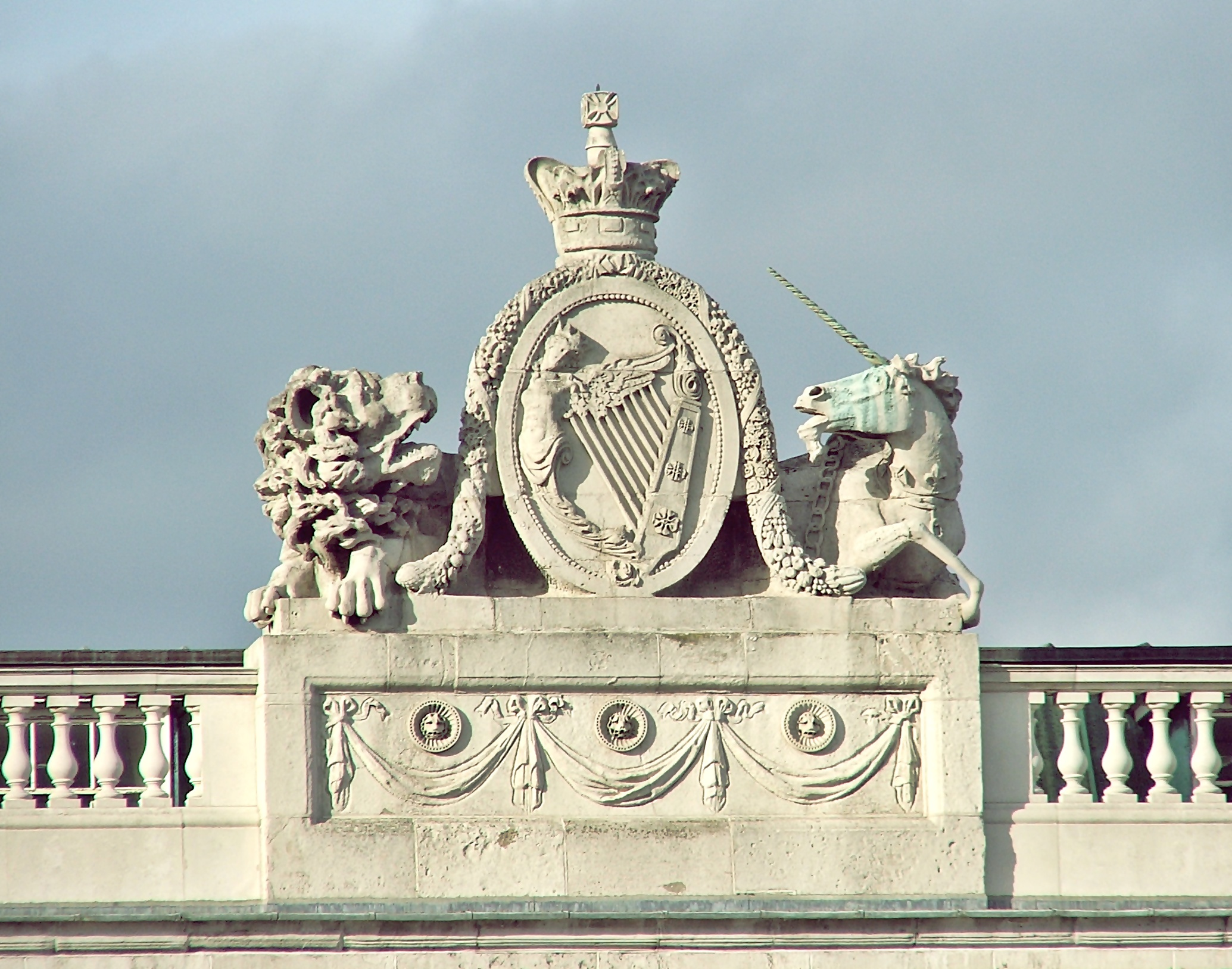
The arms of the Kingdom of Ireland on the Custom House, Dublin, with supporters from the arms of Great Britain and surmounted by the imperial crown.

The arms of Ireland are without supporters. However, historically, some depictions of the arms have been accompanied by various supporters. For example, during the late Tudor period, depictions of the arms appeared accompanied by a dragon and a lion, representing Wales and England. The Tudors were monarchs of England but of Welsh descent. In later centuries, following the union of the crowns of England and Scotland, depictions appeared accompanied by a lion and a unicorn, representing England and Scotland. Other depictions included two stags, representing Ireland, or a stag and a lion. However, none of these were ever a part of the blazon and should be interpreted in terms of artistic licence.

Several mottos associated with Ireland and have also been used alongside representations of the harp, including the patriotic slogan, Erin Go Bragh (English: Ireland Forever), Quis separabit? (English: Who will separate [us]?), the motto of the Most Illustrious Order of Saint Patrick, and It is new strung and shall be heard, the motto of the Society of United Irishmen. However, no heraldic motto has ever been granted to Ireland and none ever accompanies the coat of arms.

== Arms and Flag of the Four Provinces ==
The arms of the four traditional provinces of Ireland are popularly displayed quartered as arms of Ireland. The quartering is usually in the order Leinster first, Connacht second, Ulster third and Munster fourth. The resulting arms are frequently displayed in the form of a banner. They also appear as charges in other arms and emblems. For example, the arms of the Genealogical Office, which is headed by the Chief Herald of Ireland, are the four provinces shown quartered beneath a chief Gules, charged with a Tudor Portcullis Or between two Scrolls Argent (a red band with a gold Tudor portcullis between two silver scrolls).

The arms of Leinster (Vert, a Harp Or, stringed Argent) are believed to have likely evolved from the arms of Ireland itself with a change of tincture. Similarly, Munster's arms (Azure, three antique crowns Or) are thought to have been derived from those of the former Lordship of Ireland, or from the short-lived dukedom of Ireland created for Robert de Vere in 1386. The crowns now usually depicted as "antique" or "eastern": a gold rim with eight sharp, triangular rays, of which five are seen.

The arms of Ulster are the arms of the de Burgh, Earls of Ulster, combined with the red hand seal of the O'Neills. These two dynasties and symbols are inseparably linked to Ulster. The combination of them is blazoned Or, on a Cross Gules, an inescutcheon Argent, charged with a dexter hand erect aupaumee and couped at the wrist Gules.

Finally, Connacht's arms are blazoned Party Per Pale Argent and Azure, in the first an eagle dimidiated and displayed Sable in the second issuant from the partition an arm embowed and vested, the hand holding a sword erect, all Argent. These are believed to have been adopted from the arms of the medieval Schottenklöster (Gaelic monastery) in Regensburg, Germany. The arms of the Regensburg Schottenklöster, which date from at least the 14th century, combined the arms of the Holy Roman Emperor (from whom the abbey received protection) dimidiated with a symbol that may be linked with the crest of the O'Brien dynasty arms (an 11th-century O'Brien is listed as the "fundator" of the abbey). The arms may have been granted to Ruaidrí Ua Conchobair, King of Connacht and the last High King of Ireland before the Norman invasion, by the abbey as a gift to return his patronage. The arms were given as the "old tyme arms" of Ireland by the Athlone Pursuivant, Edward Fletcher, c. 1575 and, with slight change of tinctures, became the arms of Connacht in the seventeenth century.

The traditional arms of the four provinces of Ireland quartered to form the popular arms of Ireland

1651 provincial arms of Ireland. In the centre is the arms of Mide, while the third quarter features the arms of Hugh de Lacy (Earl of Ulster from 1205 – 1243) to represent Ulster.

== See also ==
- Armorial of Ireland
- Coat of arms of Northern Ireland
- Flag of Ireland
- Green Ensign
- Great Seal of the Irish Free State
- Irish heraldry
- List of flags of Ireland
- Seal of the president of Ireland
- Shamrock
