= Royal Dutch State Limousine =

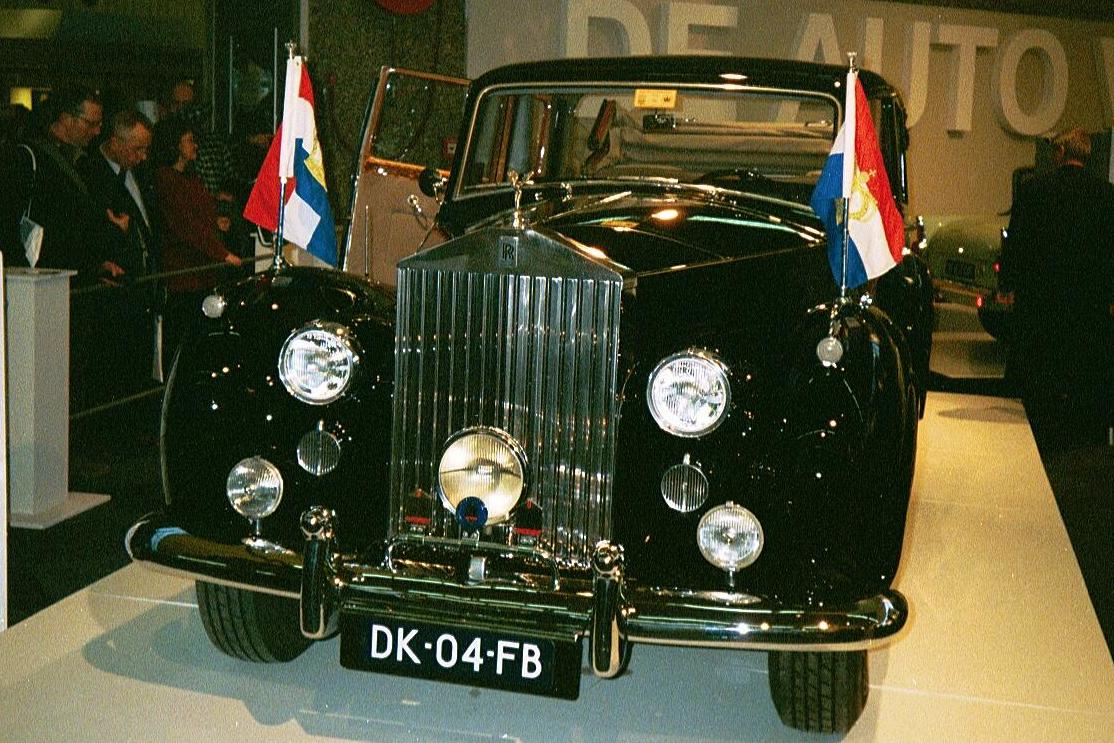
Queen Juliana's State Landaulette, on display in 2003

The Royal Dutch State Limousine is the former official state car of Queen Juliana of the Netherlands, based on a custom-built 1958 Rolls-Royce Silver Wraith Limousine Landaulette.

== History ==
A seven-seater motorcar was commissioned by Queen Juliana in September 1957 from Rolls-Royce Limited, and it was delivered to the Netherlands on 13 March 1958. It is the only left-hand drive Rolls-Royce with landaulet (landaulette) coachwork where the rear part of the roof can be folded down. Its chassis number is LGLW 24, which has the following meaning – L for left-hand drive, G for 1958, LW for long wheelbase (3.38m instead of 3.23m), and 24 is the sequence build of the series. The coachwork is by Park Ward.

Features ordered by the Queen include a customised radio made by Philips, both a crown and the initial J painted on the outside of the back doors, and crowns in relief on the inner side of the back doors. In addition, at the right armrest, there are three grooves to hold a notebook, a make-up mirror and a cigarette case.

The car has been used mainly for state visits, being used for the first time for the state visit to the Netherlands by Queen Elizabeth II, on 20 March 1958. Other royal visitors who used the car include Baudouin of Belgium, the Shah of Persia and his wife Farah Dibah, the King of Thailand Bhumibol Adulyadej and his wife Sirikit, the kings of Norway, Sweden, Denmark, other heads of state, ambassadors, etc. Princess Beatrix and Prince Claus also used the Rolls-Royce on their tour of Dutch provinces and towns following their engagement in the autumn of 1965.

At the end on the 1970s, it was decided that the Rolls-Royce would no longer be used for official functions. At first, it was kept in the garage of the Soestdijk Palace, then later it went to the Royal Mews in The Hague. The car was sold in 1979 to a private car rental firm.

== See also ==
- Official state car – Netherlands
- Royal Danish Ceremonial Car "Store Krone"
