= Presidential state car (Ireland) =

Presidential State Car
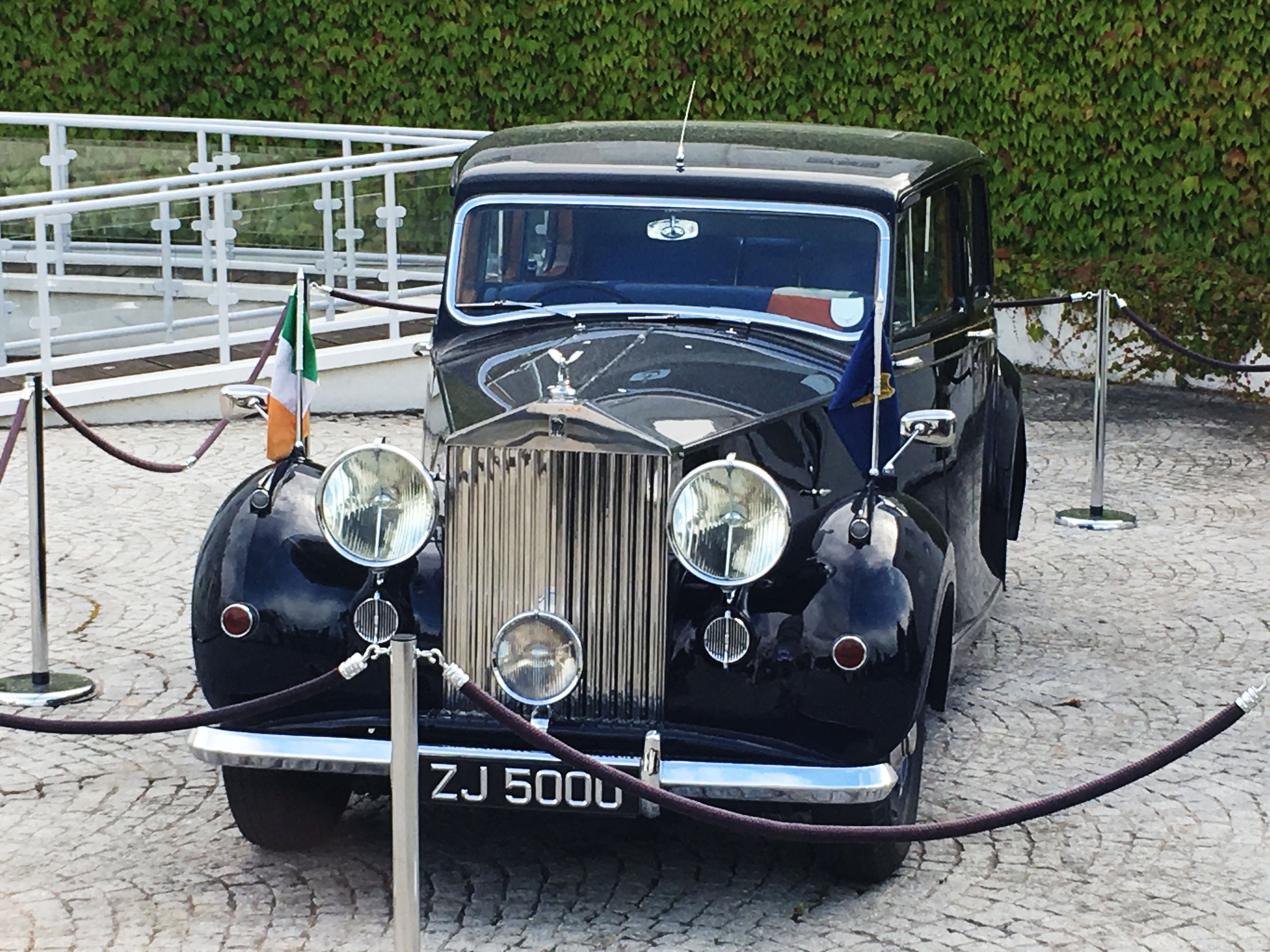
- The Presidential State Car outside Áras an Uachtaráin in 2017

The Presidential State Car is the official state car of the President of Ireland. It is a 1947 Rolls-Royce Silver Wraith landaulette. It is used on state occasions and ceremonial events, but not for routine transportation.

== Origins ==
Douglas Hyde, the first president of Ireland was provided with a state car, but his near fatal stroke early into his term of office meant that he rarely travelled in public. When he retired in 1945 the Irish state decided that, his successor, Seán T. O'Kelly, needed a special state vehicle for formal occasions. However what type of vehicle it should be caused an immediate row between the President-elect Seán T. O'Kelly and the Taoiseach, Éamon de Valera. O'Kelly wanted to have a state horse-drawn carriage whereas de Valera wished to have a car.

Initially O'Kelly got his wish and he was transported to the 1945 Irish presidential inauguration in the landau of the late Queen Alexandra the Queen Mother, which had been hired specially from a Dublin livery company. The landau was accompanied by the Irish presidential Mounted Escort, the Blue Hussars.

Contrary to expectations, the use of the landau proved a major success. In response, the new Irish state travel company, Córas Iompair Éireann (CIÉ) offered to build a special presidential carriage for use on state occasions. However, in his enthusiasm for the project and contrary to warnings that the horses had not yet been fully trained to deal with crowds, the President insisted that the new carriage, drawn by horses, be used to bring him to the historic Dublin Horse Show at the Royal Dublin Society in August 1946. The crowds stood up and cheered as the President and Mrs O'Kelly entered the showgrounds in the carriage. The horses took fright, reared up and the coach jackknifed. De Valera seized the moment and abolished the use of the presidential carriage (except for going to the RDS). Instead he ordered that the Irish state buy a new Rolls-Royce. The Blue Hussars were abolished the following year.

== Use of the car ==
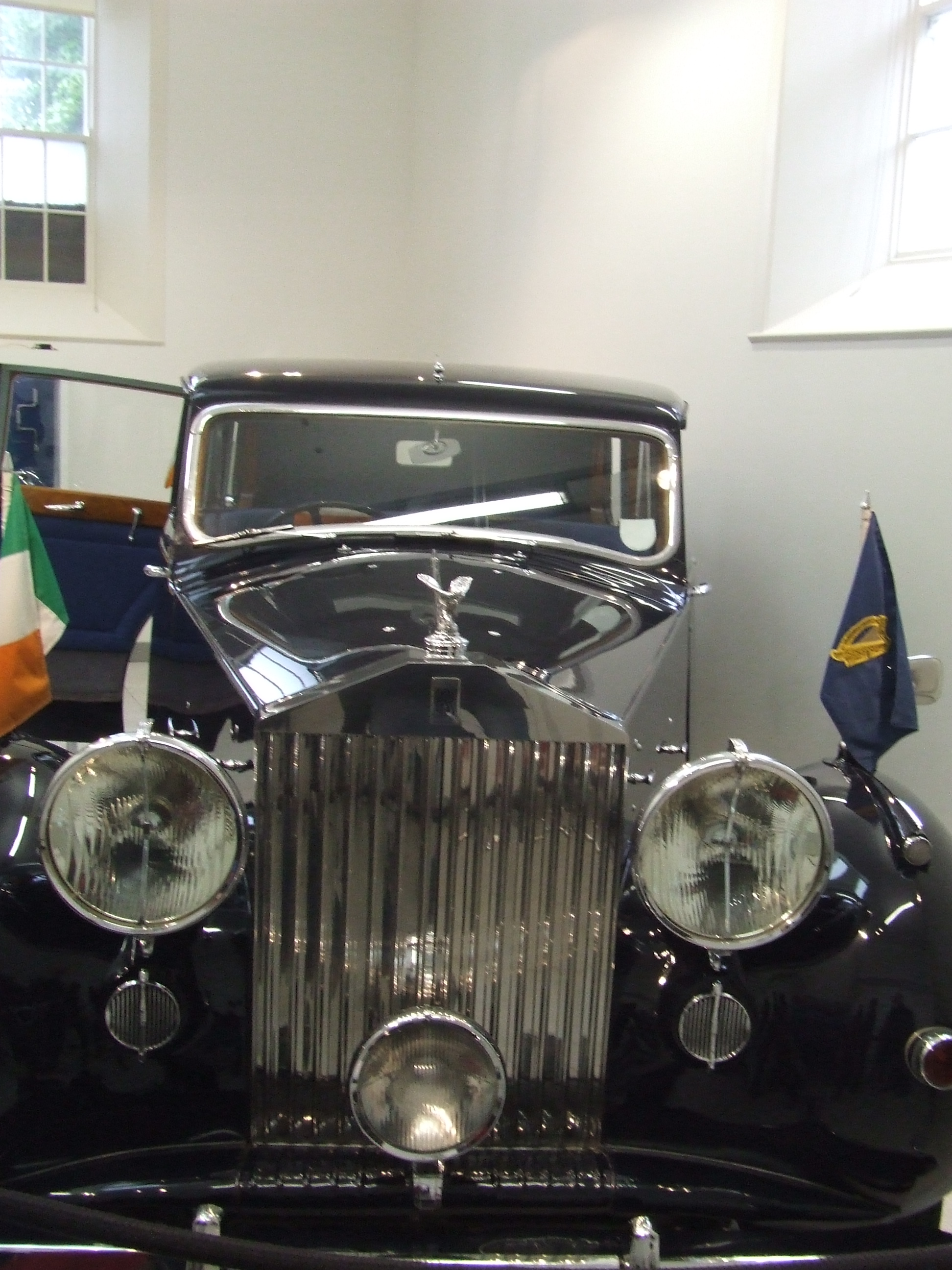
The car with flags on display, 2015

The car has a flagpole mounted on each of the front mudguards. Ordinarily these flew the Flag of Ireland and the Presidential Standard; when a foreign dignitary was travelling with the president then the relevant foreign flag would replace the Presidential Standard. In 1950 the car was put at the disposal of the visiting Catholic Archbishop of Sydney, Cardinal Norman Thomas Gilroy, and flew the Flag of Vatican City from both poles.

The car was always maintained by the Department of Defence and driven by a Military driver, until President Erskine H. Childers took office, then it was passed over to the Garda Síochána where it had been maintained since and driven by a Garda.

== Proposal for selling off ==
Though the matter came up before the Public Accounts Committee in November 1975, the car was allowed to rot away in storage in an army garage. By May 1976 it was reported by the Army Barrack Master that it would cost £3,000 to restore it.

In August 1976, however, an enthusiast active in the veteran and vintage car world in Ireland wrote to the Taoiseach offering to buy the car from the Government. He wished to prevent it going overseas as so many of the interesting early cars in the country did. The matter was shelved. The car had in any case now passed from the Army to the Garda, but then it was decided to just sell it off with the next lot of redundant garda squad cars.

The proposal to auction off Éamon de Valera's presidential car in 1976 resulted in the Attorney General being asked for his opinion on whether the historic car was covered by the National Monuments Act of 1930.

A Department of Justice memo said a technical report indicated the Rolls-Royce (registration ZJ 5000) was not suitable to be used as a State car as it was in need of "a general overhaul" and it was decided to dispose of it. "The question has arisen whether the car could be regarded as coming within the definition of "archaeological object", the memo says. If so that would mean the car could not be exported without a special licence from the Minister for Education.

It says the car was originally purchased for ceremonial occasions, but in practice was mainly used by the president. After de Valera moved to the Áras an Uachtaráin in 1959, it was used wholly by him. "As he became increasingly feeble, it was found that the high dimensions of the Rolls facilitated his movement in and out of the car."

When he retired in 1973 he was allowed to continue to use the car until his death in 1975. After he died it was returned to the Government establishment. But by this date Ministers preferred to use American or German cars. No-one wanted to use the Rolls.

The Attorney General said it had to be decided was de Valera "an historical person" and whether the value of the Rolls-Royce would be inflated because of his association with it. He said it could not be doubted that de Valera "played a significant role in the life of the country" but it was a matter of opinion whether his presidential years represented the most significant period of his career. Eventually it was decided that he was. But nevertheless the lawyers saw no difficulty about selling off the car.

But at the end of the year the matter crept into the papers. Questions were asked: Where is ZJ 5000?

The Minister for Justice, Gerry Collins, took up the matter. The decision was reversed at a cabinet meeting on 6 September 1977. The car was saved. The mechanics went to work on it and it was restored from its shabby condition for mere £400-£500.

In due course in the spring of 1978 the car, splendidly restored, with Minister Gerry Collins on hand, was unveiled to the public in its more mature role as an archaeological relic.

The by-now quite bulky file on the matter closes in September 1978 with observation that the car "is now in running order and will be available for use by the president for ceremonial State occasions".

== Associations ==
Though used by Seán T. O'Kelly from 1947 the car is most strongly associated with his successor, Éamon de Valera, who served two full terms, holding office from 1959 to 1973. De Valera came to embody the presidency, with its symbols in turn associated personally with him, it earned the nickname Dev's Car because of his high profile use of it. Part of that was a product of the appearance of Telifís Éireann, (Note: It was then known Telifís Éireann, it is now Raidió Teilifís Éireann.) Ireland's national broadcasting station, during his first term, allowing a greater public profile for whoever was president.

== Modern usage ==
The historic 1947 Rolls-Royce has continued to be used in some state ceremonies, such as the National Day of Commemoration and most notably at the Irish presidential inauguration, where the car is used to transport the President (or president-elect) to and from the ceremony in Dublin Castle. It was used most recently at the 2004 inauguration of the eighth president of Ireland, Mary McAleese. However, at the inauguration of Michael D. Higgins in November 2011, the Rolls-Royce was not used, but the official Mercedes-Benz S-Class was used instead.

For day to day transport, the president uses a Mercedes-Benz S-Class.
