= Royal Danish Ceremonial Car "Store Krone" =

Official state car

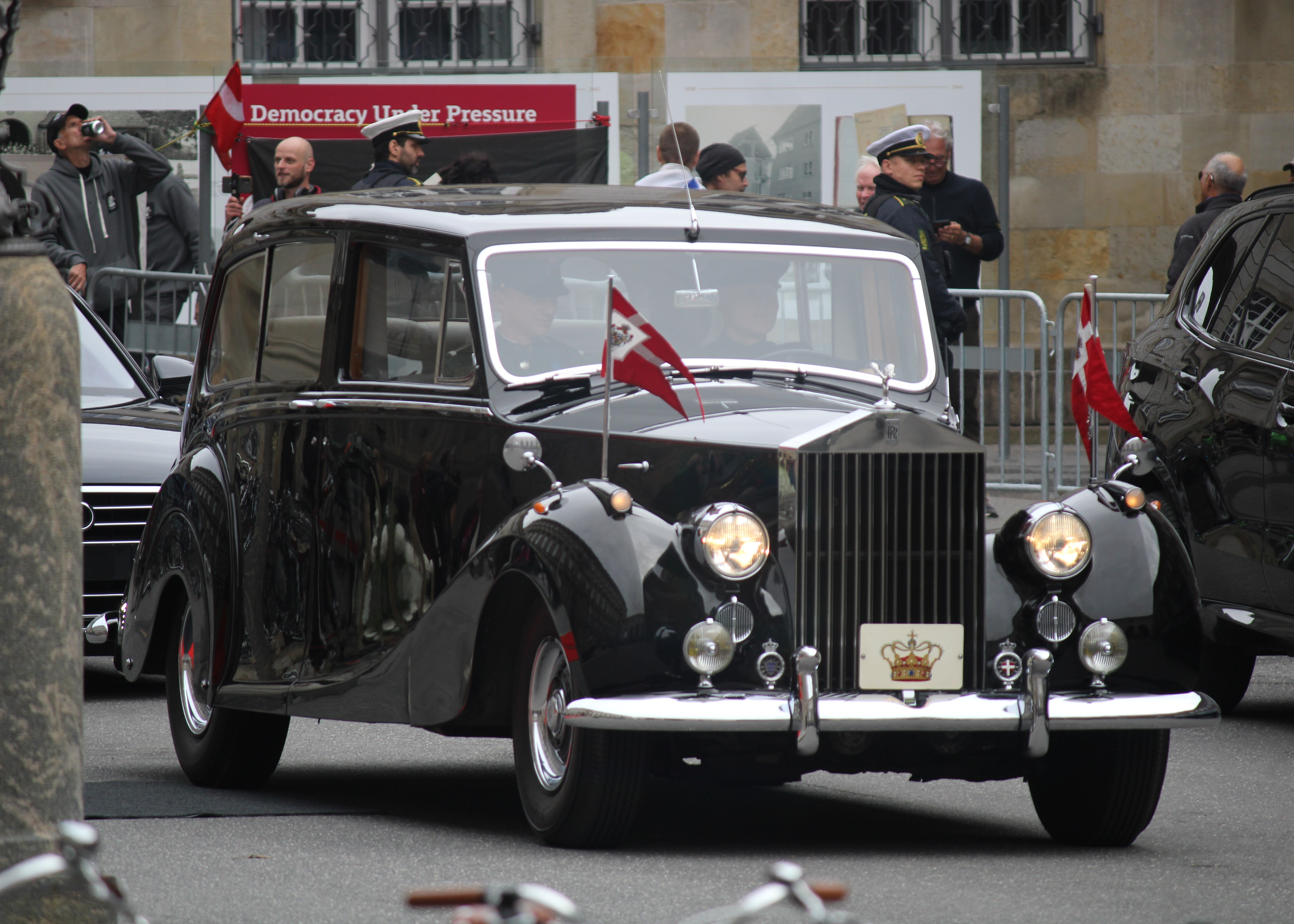
"Store Krone" at the 2025 opening of the Danish parliament

The Royal Danish Ceremonial Car "Store Krone" is a 1958 Rolls-Royce Silver Wraith limousine. It has served since new as the official state car of the Danish head of state, currently King Frederik X of Denmark. The name "Store Krone" (Danish for 'Great Crown') refers to the car's number plate, which consists of a large royal crown on a white background.

== Origins ==
King Frederik IX of Denmark commissioned the vehicle in 1958 from Rolls-Royce Limited. It remains the flagship of the Danish monarchy's fleet of cars for official use.

The vehicle is an imposing Rolls-Royce Silver Wraith seven-seater limousine, with chassis number LGLW 25, body number 10181, model 1958. "LGLW 25" has the following meaning – L for left-hand drive, G for 1958, LW for long wheelbase (3,38m instead of 3,23m), and 25 is a sequential number that means it was the 25th car of the series GLW. The previous car in the sequence build of the series, with chassis number LGLW 24, was the Royal Dutch State Limousine commissioned by Queen Juliana of the Netherlands.

A total of 66 Silver Wraiths were delivered to customers in 1958. On 11 April 1958, the warranty certificate was issued to His Majesty The King of Denmark, The Royal Palace, Copenhagen, Denmark by the seller and supplier Hooper & Co. (Coachbuilder) Ltd. of 54 St. James Street, Piccadilly, London S.W.1.

== Engine ==
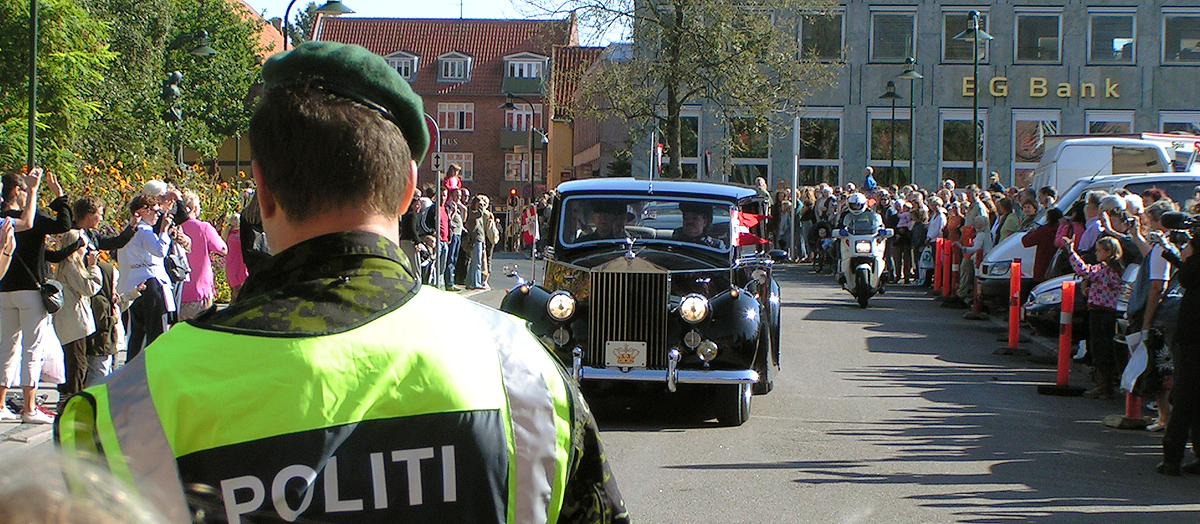
"Store Krone" on the streets of Roskilde in 2008

The engine is a 6-cylinder in-line engine of 4,887 ccm with an overhead inlet and side exhaust valves. Fed by two SU carburettors, unofficially the engine generates approximately 180 HP, according to a test drive of the Silver Wraith carried out by the British automobile magazine, The Autocar. The engine is the biggest in the Silver Wraith models and from 1954 when it was bored out from 4,257 ccm. In 1959 the engine was discontinued from the Rolls-Royce engine programme after 19 years.

The engine uses a four-speed RR-General Motors Hydramatic transmission. The wheelbase is 337.8 cm, the wheel gauge is 148.6 cm front and 162.6 cm rear, and the length is 528 cm, the width: 183 cm and the height: 178 cm. Own weight is 2,358 kg. The tyres are 6.50 x 17″ on 5″ rims.

== Modern use ==
The car is currently used for the royal family's major official events. It is also used to transport distinguished foreign guests to official events.

== See also ==
- Official state car – Denmark
- Royal Dutch State Limousine
