= Rolls-Royce Silver Wraith =

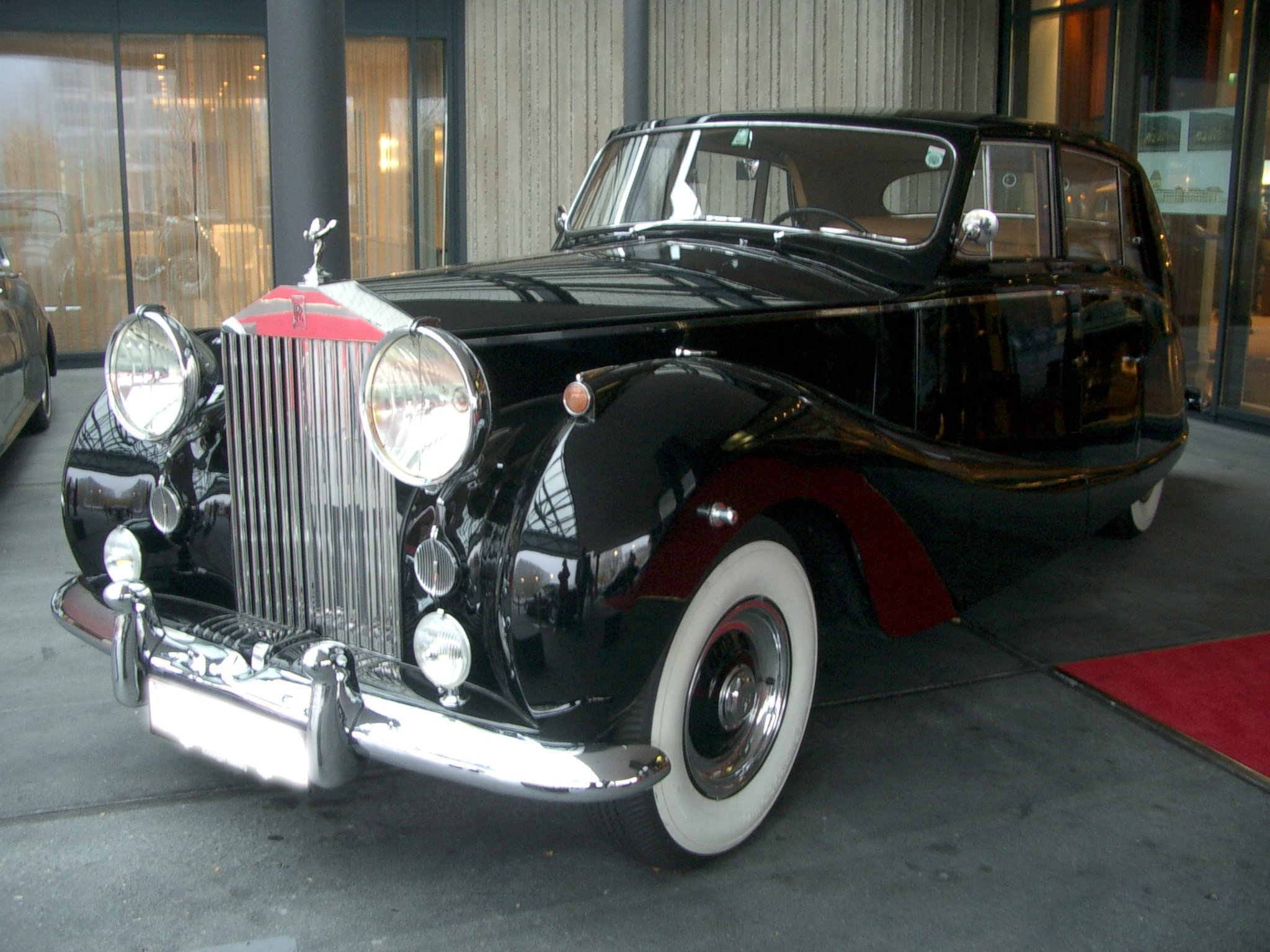
- 1955 Silver Wraith, body by Hooper & Co

Overview
- Manufacturer: Rolls-Royce Ltd
- Production: 1946–1958; 1.883 produced (incl. 639 LWB cars)
- Assembly: United Kingdom: Crewe, Cheshire, England

Body and chassis
- Class: Full-size luxury car (F)
- Body style: Mostly 4-door saloons, but other body styles were erected on this chassis.
- Layout: Front-engine, rear-wheel-drive
- Related: Rolls-Royce Silver Dawn

Powertrain
- Engine: 4.3 L (260 cu in) I6 (1946–1951); 4.6 L (280 cu in) I6 (1951–1955); 4.9 L (300 cu in) I6 (1955–1958)
- Transmission: 4-speed manual with synchromesh; 4-speed Hydramatic automatic optional from 1952

Dimensions
- Wheelbase: 3225.8 mm (127 in) (1946–1953); 3378.2 mm (133 in) (1951–1958)

Chronology
- Predecessor: Rolls-Royce Wraith (1938)
- Successor: Rolls-Royce Silver Cloud II LWB

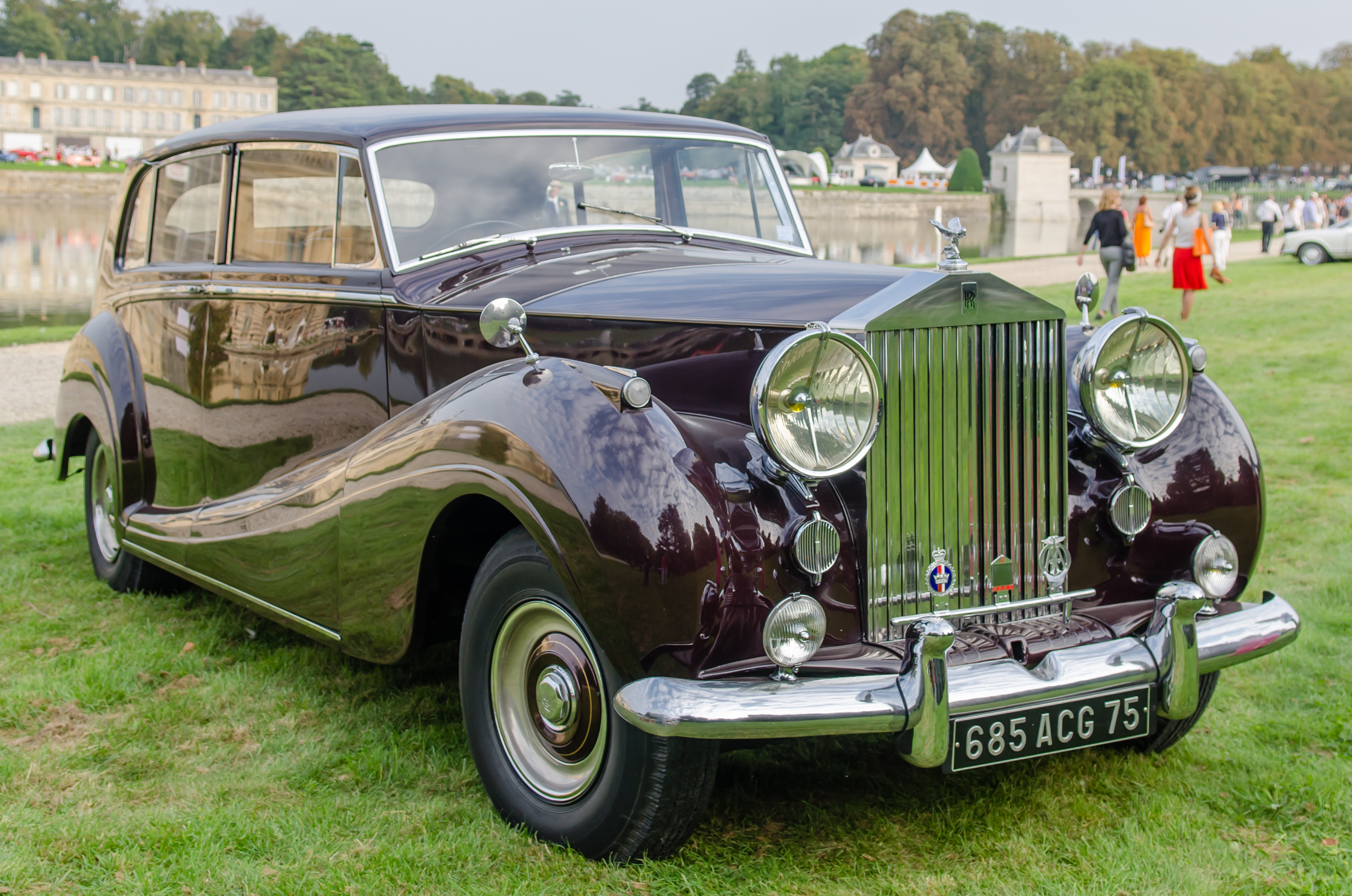
1956 Rolls-Royce Silver Wraith touring limousine by H J Mulliner

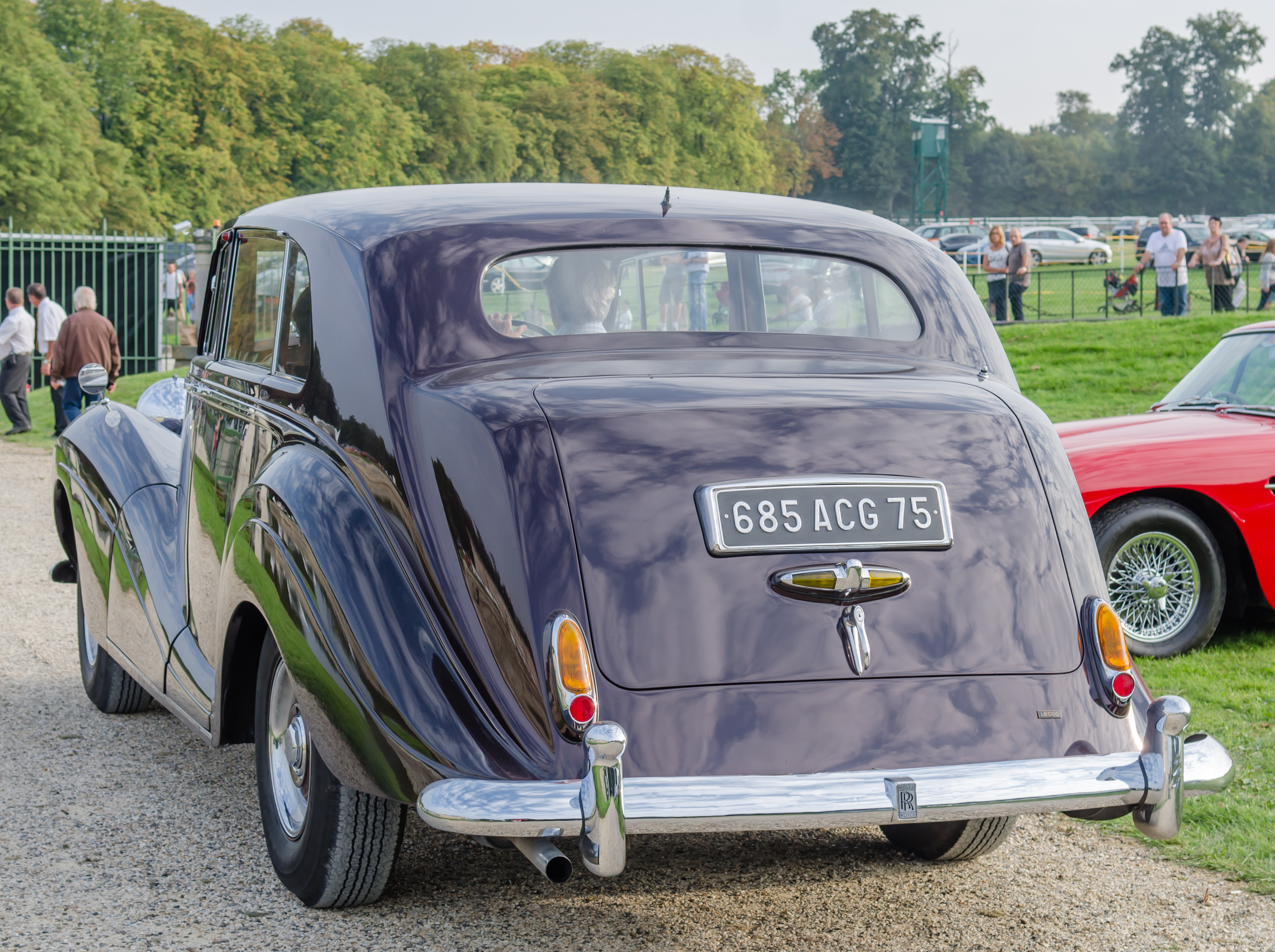
Rear of the touring limousine

The Rolls-Royce Silver Wraith was the first post-war Rolls-Royce. It was made from 1946 to 1958 as only a chassis at the company's Crewe factory, its former Merlin engine plant, alongside the shorter Bentley Mark VI. The Bentley was also available as a chassis for coachbuilders, but for the first time could be bought with a Rolls-Royce built Standard Steel body. The use of the name "wraith" continued the tradition of naming models after "ghosts".

It was announced by Rolls-Royce in April 1946 as the 25/30 hp replacement for the 1939 Wraith in what had been their 20 hp and 20/25 hp market sector, that is to say Rolls-Royce's smaller car. The size was chosen to be in keeping with the mood of post-war austerity. Even very limited production of the chassis of the larger car, the Phantom IV, was not resumed until 1950 and then, officially, only for Heads of State.

Improvements announced were: chromium-plated cylinder bores for the engine; a new more rigid chassis frame to go with new independent front suspension; and a new synchromesh gearbox. Chassis lubrication was now centralised.

== Engine ==
The straight six-cylinder postwar engine replaced conventional overhead valve gear with an F-head configuration of overhead inlet valves and side exhaust valves and reshaped combustion chambers. There were new main and big-end bearings and a more efficient drive to the timing gear. To this prewar mix Rolls-Royce added chromed bores. Initially, this engine retained the Mark V's capacity of 4,257 cc (259.8 cu in) increased from 1951 to 4,566 cc (278.6 cu in) and in 1955, after the introduction of the (standard wheelbase) Silver Cloud, to 4,887 cc (298.2 cu in) for the remaining Silver Wraiths.

== Chassis ==
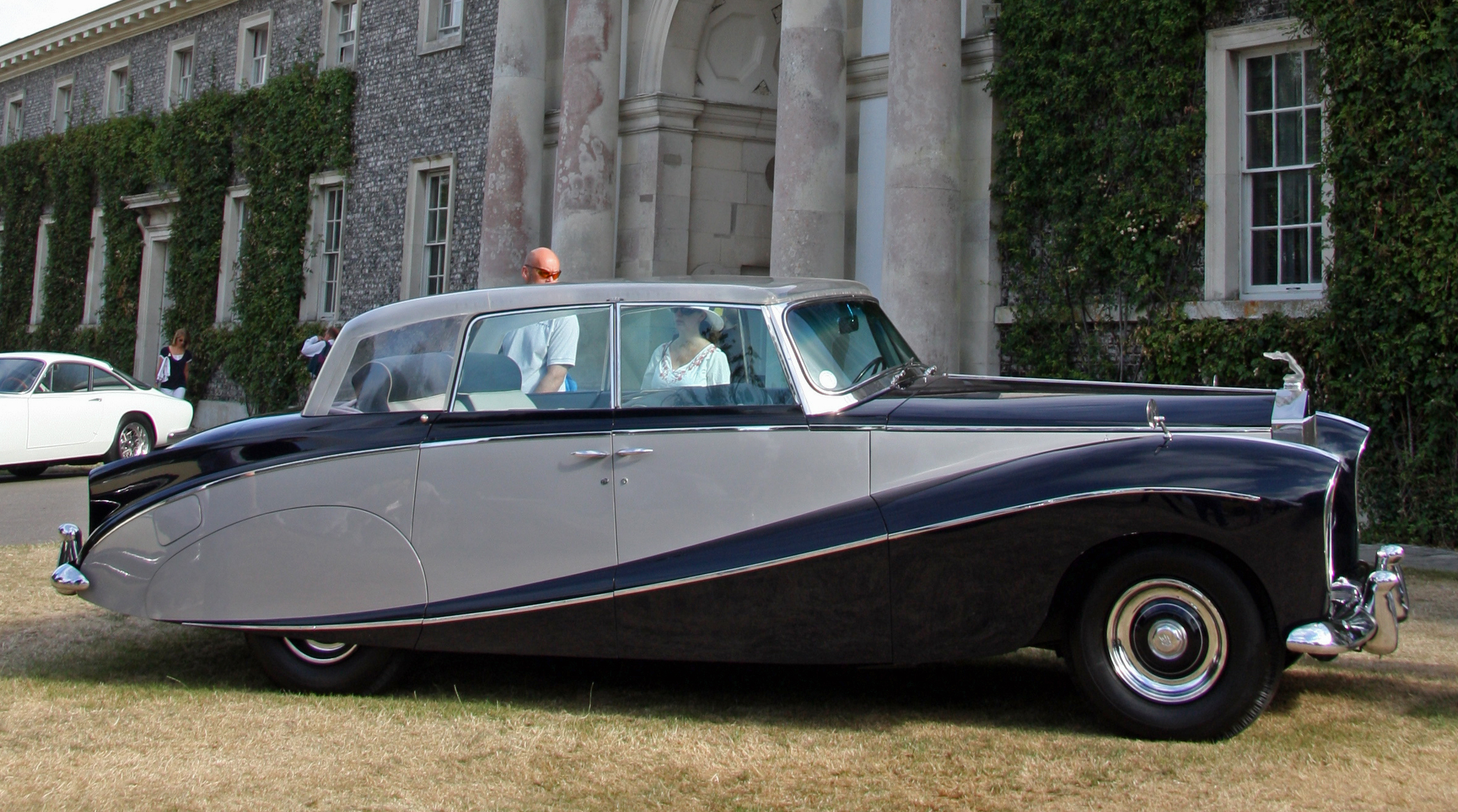
1956 Silver Wraith by Hooper clear perspex top for Nubar Gulbenkian

The first cars had an entirely new 127 inch (3226 mm) wheelbase chassis which differed considerably from that of the pre-war Wraith and was much nearer rigid. It matched the new Bentley chassis but with an extra 7 inch section added to the centre. The new chassis had coil sprung independent front suspension, which required a very rigid chassis to function properly, and at the rear conventional semi-elliptic springs and live axle. The braking system was a hydro-mechanical hybrid of hydraulic fronts and mechanical rears using the mechanical servo similar to that of the pre-war cars.

The last short-wheelbase cars were delivered in November 1953. The long, 133 inch (3378 mm), wheelbase chassis was announced in 1951 and the first delivered in January 1952. 639 were made by the time of the last deliveries in October 1958.

This was one of the last Rolls-Royce model to be supplied as a rolling chassis, able to be used with a variety of bespoke coachwork, which was designed and made by a rapidly declining number of specialist coachbuilders. Most of the bodies used "formal" limousine designs.

From 1949 until 1955 customers wishing to buy a Rolls-Royce fitted with a much smaller standard steel body could purchase the Silver Dawn. It rode on a chassis seven inches shorter than the Silver Wraith, and was almost identical to Rolls-Royce's Bentley Standard Steel saloon available alongside the Silver Wraith since July 1946.

== Automatic transmission ==
Initially only a four-speed manual gearbox was offered, but this was supplemented by a General Motors Hydramatic automatic option from 1952.

== Official uses ==
- Irish Presidential State Car – 1947–present
- Brazilian Presidential Ceremonial State Car – 1952–present
- President of Zimbabwe's Ceremonial State Car - 1952–present
- Royal Dutch State Limousine – 1958
- Royal Danish Ceremonial Car "Store Krone" (Great Crown) – 1958–present
- Royal Greek Ceremonial Car (Silver Wraith Hooper version) – 1959
- 2 Australian Ceremonial Cars for Royal Tour (Silver Wraith All-weather tourer by Hooper) – 1959
- Governor of Penang, Malaysia. Previously owned by Sir Henry Gurney, British High Commissioner of Malaya Before being ambushed by communist forces during the Malayan Emergency. – circa 1951
- Yugoslav Presidential State Car - 1952

A 1951 white Rolls Royce Silver Wraith car in San Diego, California, US, 2026.

A closeup view of the silver hood ornament of a 1951 white Rolls Royce Silver Wraith car in San Diego, California, US, 2026.

== Film appearances ==
- Witness for the Prosecution (1957)
- Indiscreet (1958)
- Let's Make Love (1960)
- Victim (1961)
- From Russia with Love (1963)
- Joy House (Les félins) (1964)
- The Love Bug (1968)
- The Return of the Pink Panther (1975)
- Stardust Memories (1980)
- Arthur (1981)
- Withnail and I (1987)
- The Karate Kid, Part III (1989)
- Batman (1989)
- Batman Returns (1992)
- The Odd Couple II (1998)
- James Dean (2001)
- The Scapegoat (2012)
- Spectre (2015)
- Turn Coat (2009)

== Gallery ==
=== State cars ===
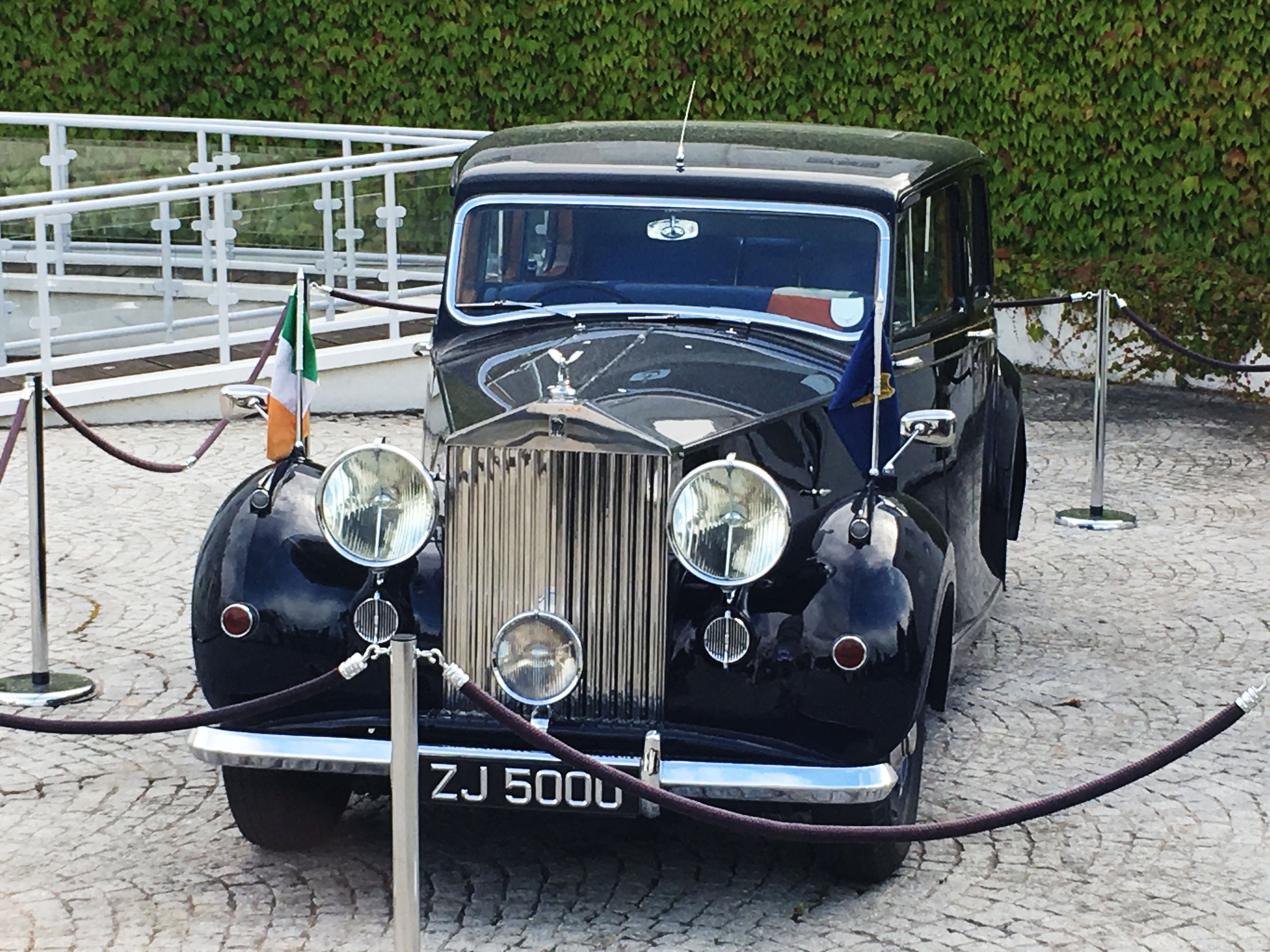
Presidential State Car (Ireland) 1947

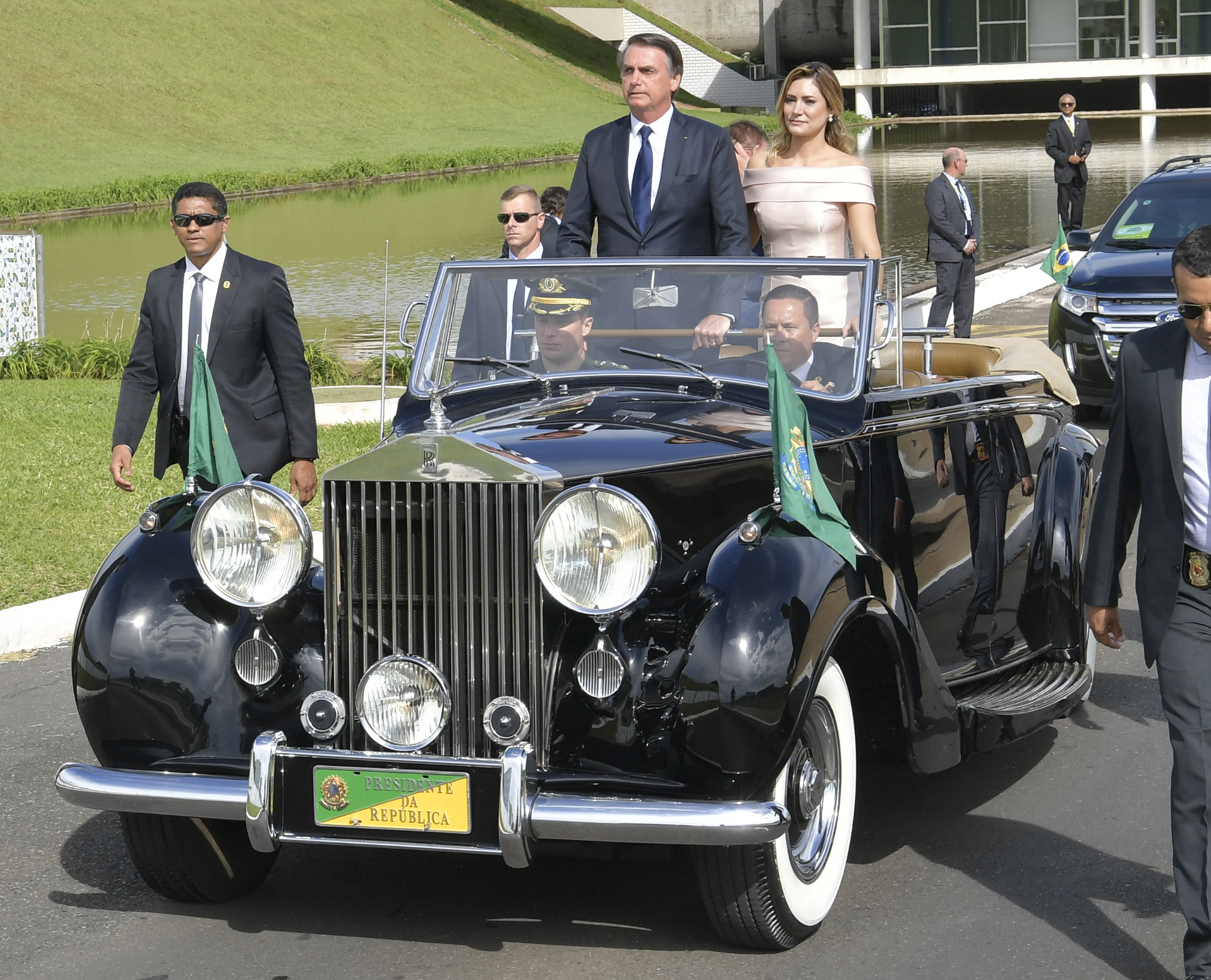
Presidential State Car (Brazil) 1952

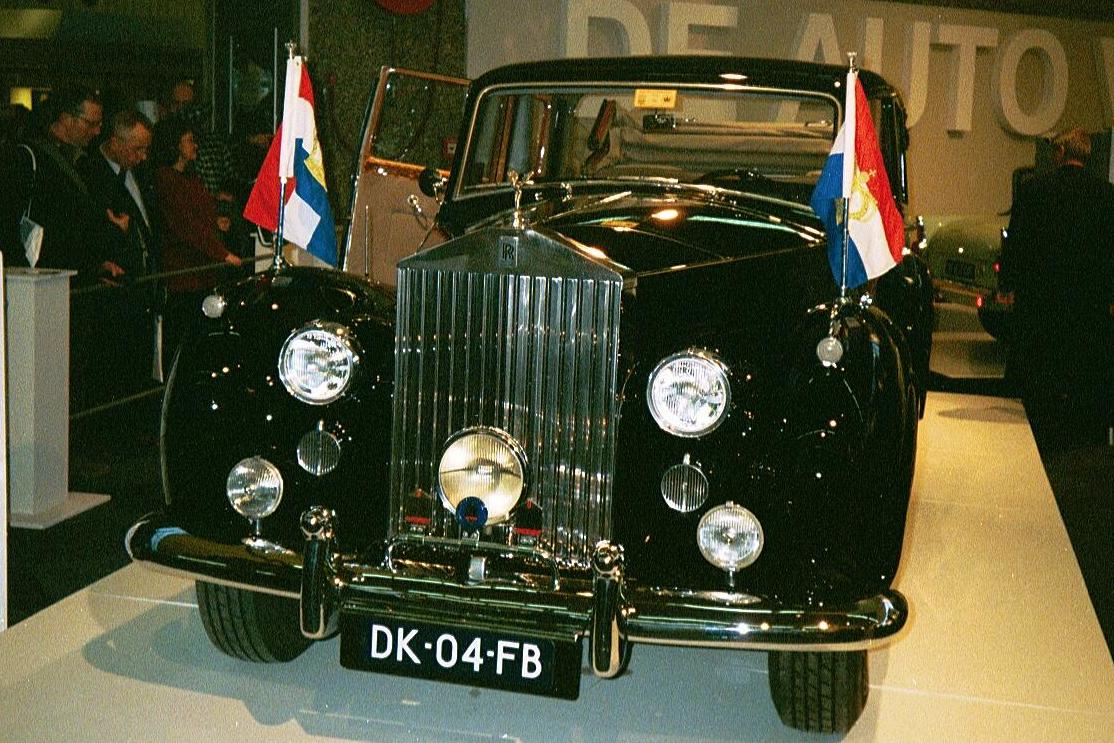
Royal Dutch State Limousine
1958

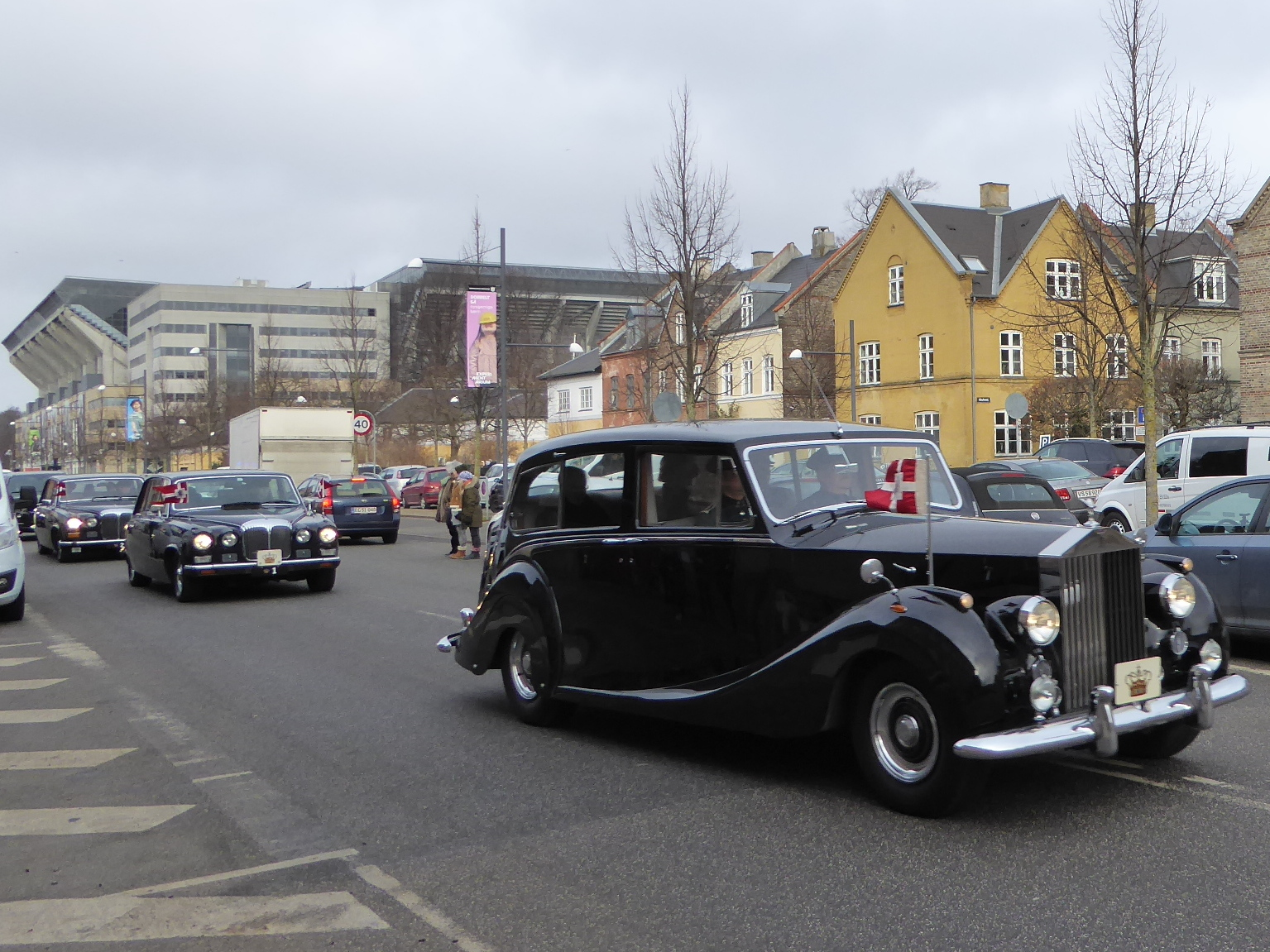
Royal Danish Ceremonial Car "Store Krone" 1958

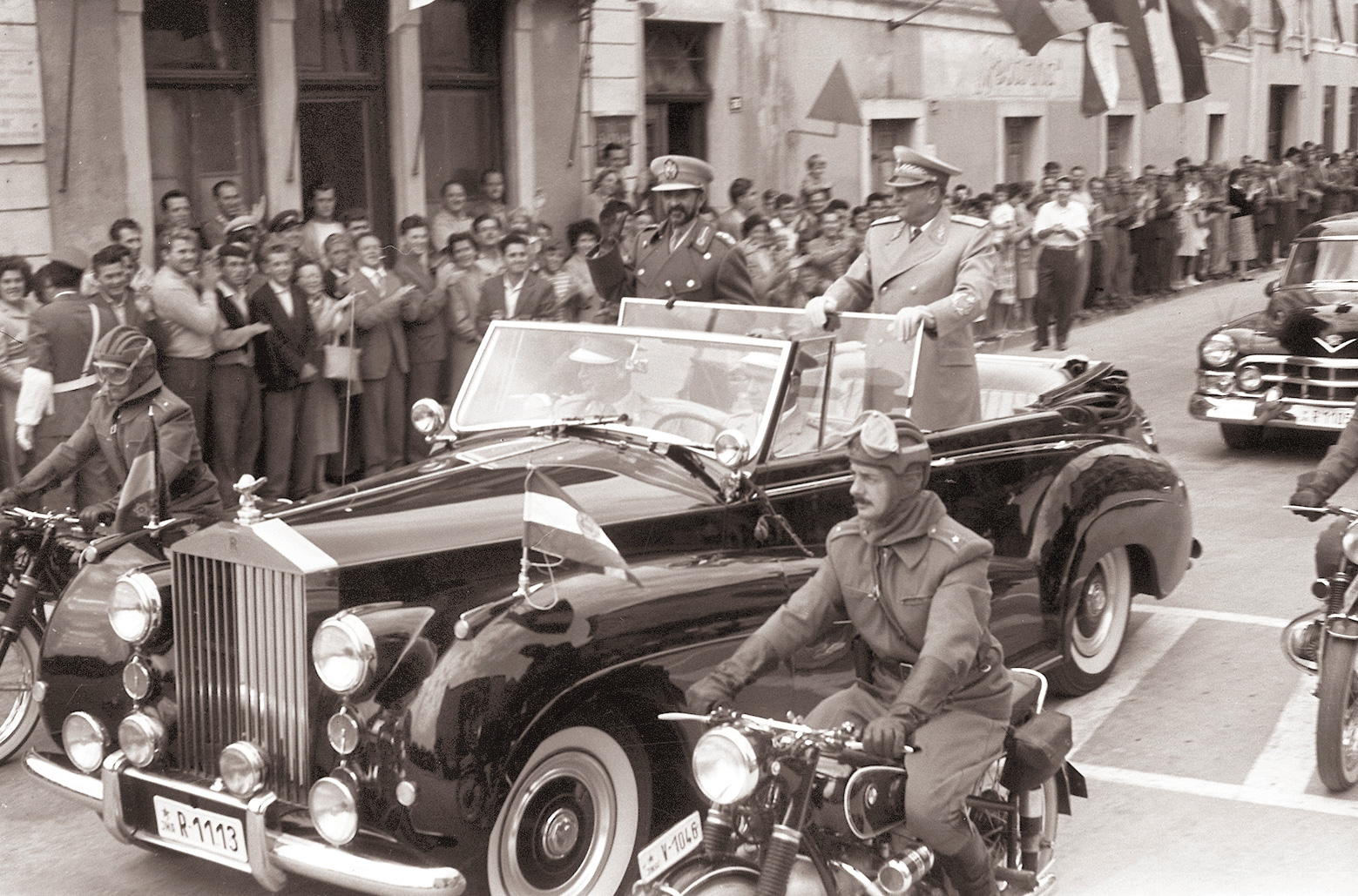
Josip Broz Tito and Emperor Haile Selassie 1959

== Sources ==
- Culshaw, David; Horrobin, Peter (2013) [1974]. The Complete Catalogue of British Cars 1895 – 1975 (e-book ed.). Poundbury, Dorchester, UK: Veloce Publishing. ISBN 978-1-845845-83-4.
