= Coat of arms of Meath =

Arms of a medieval Irish province

Coat of arms

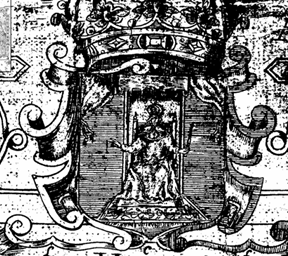
1651 depiction

Mide or Meath, a medieval Irish province, is sometimes represented by a coat of arms comprising a monarch "in majesty": that is, seated on a throne on a field of azure (blue). The arms of Mide appear alongside those of the four modern provinces on a 1651 map of Galway. The arms reflect the fact that Tara, the seat of the High King of Ireland, was in Mide. This symbolism is derived from iconography rather than classical heraldry; mediaeval royal seals portrayed a majesty on the obverse and the arms of the sovereign on the reverse. The sceptre, here shown to have six oval nodules, represented power, and the outstretched right hand justice; both of these were royal prerogatives. The old province of Meath is nearly coextensive with the present-day Diocese of Meath. The arms of Meath were apparently used at one time as the arms of Ireland, but with the majesty on a field of sable (black) instead of azure.

Meath GAA uses a logo incorporating the arms. The arms of Meath County Council are an unrelated design.
