= Coat of arms of Munster =

Versions
- The banner of arms, which serves as provincial flag
- Armiger: Munster
- Shield: Azure, three antique crowns Or

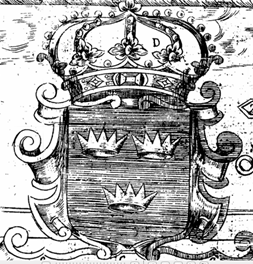
1651 depiction

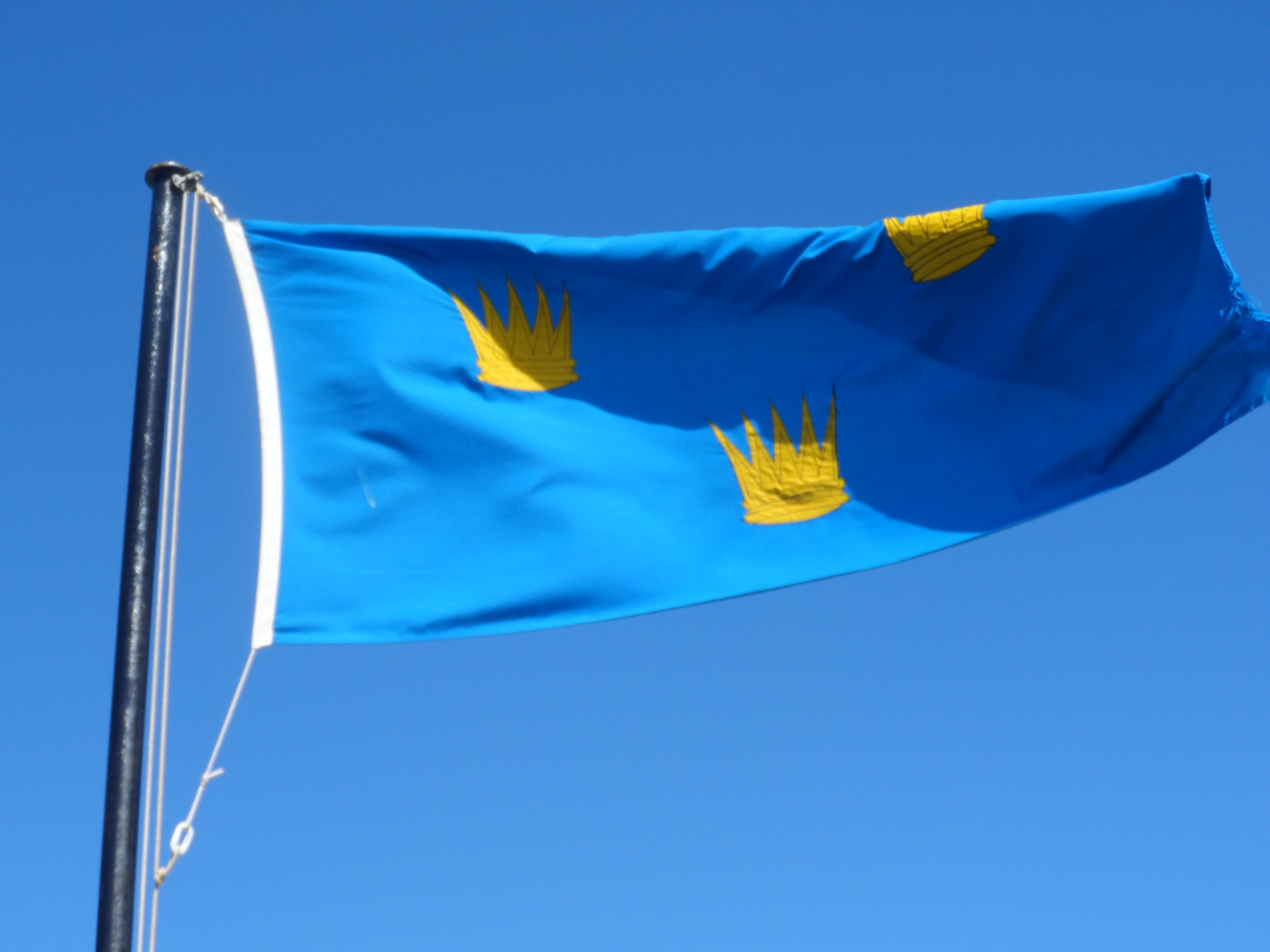
Flag flying over James Joyce Tower and Museum

The coat of arms of Munster consists of three gold crowns on a blue field. Similar crowns were included on the arms of Ireland before being superseded by the golden harp in the 16th century.

The meaning of the three crowns is not certain, but one possibility is that they may represent three of the medieval Hiberno-Norman lordships in Munster; the O'Briens (Thomond), the Butlers (Ormond) and the Fitzgeralds (Desmond). Other sources suggest that the arms (dark blue, three antique crowns Or) are derived from the short-lived dukedom of Ireland created for Robert de Vere in 1386. Further sources suggest that the crown motif dates to the earlier Kingdom of Munster, based on a thirteenth-century crozier head which was decorated with a crown on a blue enamel surface and found near the Rock of Cashel, the seat of the Gaelic Irish Kings of Munster.

The crowns are usually depicted as "antique" or "eastern": a gold rim with eight sharp, triangular rays, of which five are seen.

== History ==
The Irish province of Munster has been heraldically symbolised by three golden antique crowns on a deep blue shield since at least the 17th century. Prior to the mid-1600s, the arms of Munster were reputedly represented as Gules a cubit arm fessways holding a sword erect all proper, possibly deriving from the first arms of the O'Brien dynasty.

While first recorded in the 17th century as a heraldic representation of Munster, the three crowns motif was reputedly "brought into Ireland with the Normans at the earliest".

While some sources suggest that the three crowns represent Thomond (Tuamhain, North Munster), Desmond (Deasumhain, South Munster), and Ormond (Urumhain, East Munster), the antique Irish crown motif which inspired them is believed to be older. For example, a crown of a type known as 'antique Irish', crafted in burnished metal and resting on a blue enamel surface, forms part of a Gaelic Irish thirteenth-century crozier head found near Cormac's Chapel on the Rock of Cashel, and now held in the National Museum of Ireland, Dublin. Cashel was, in the thirteenth century, the seat of the Kings of Munster. In the case of the 'king-bishops' of Cashel, the placing of the antique crown on their crozier was a symbolic assertion of their political sovereignty over Munster. It is suggested therefore that the sovereignty of Munster, as expressed in heraldic format, uses the antique crown in triplicate – where the tripling of symbols in heraldic art is simply a convention to achieve balance on the triangular surface of a shield. As to the tincture (colour) of the Munster shield, in Gaelic mythology the sovereignty of Munster was personified in Mór Muman – a lady or goddess dressed in deep blue robes.

== Modern forms and uses ==
The Munster flag and three crowns motif are used by the Munster Gaelic Athletic Association and the Munster rugby team, including within the logos of both sporting organisations.

The flag of Munster is sometimes displayed alongside the flags of Leinster, Ulster and Connacht, and forms part of the combined flag of the Provinces of Ireland.

Four Provinces Flag of Ireland

Flag of the Irish Rugby Football Union

Flag of Hockey Ireland

Ensign of the Royal Cork Yacht Club

Burgee of the Royal Munster Yacht Club (pre-1966)

House flag of Irish Shipping (1947–1984)
