= Armorial Wijnbergen =

Medieval French roll of arms

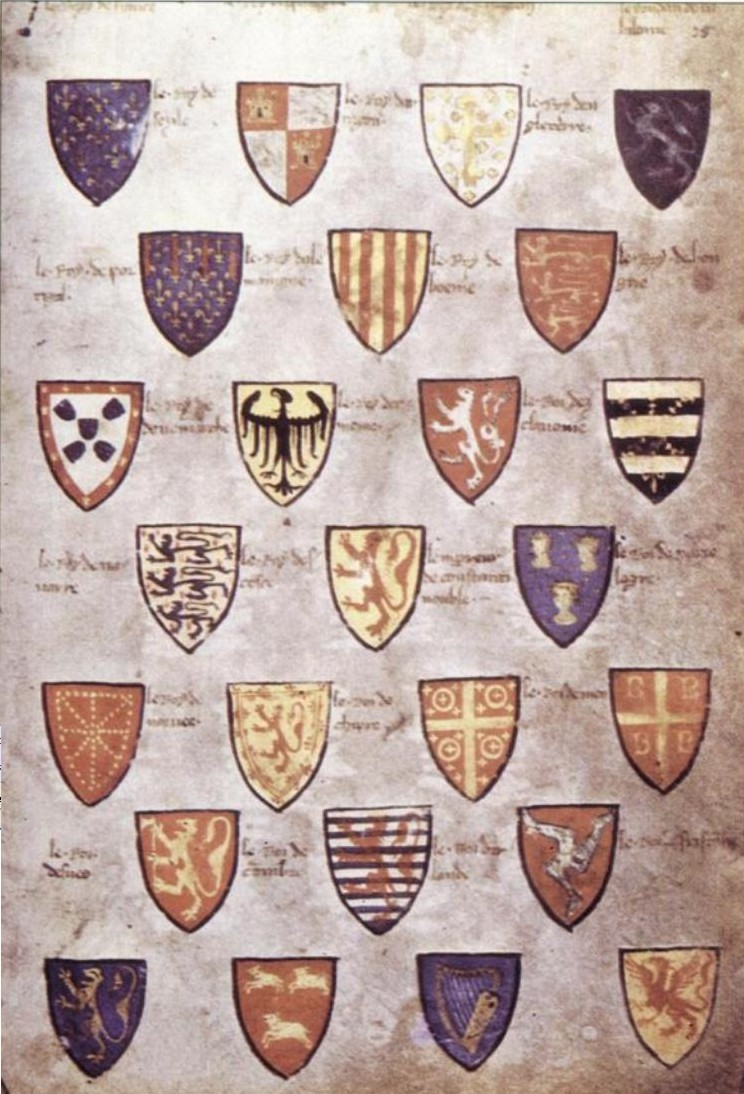
The final part of the ms. (nos. 1257–1281, showing arms for the kings of France, Castile, and Jerusalem, the "Sultan of Babylonia", the kings of Sicily, Aragon, England, Portugal, Germany, Bohemia, Hungary, Denmark, Armenia, Slavonia, Navarre, and Scotland, the emperor of Constantinople, the "king Palaiologus", and the kings of Norway, Cyprus, Mann, Sweden, and arms representing Coimbra, Ireland, and Frisia.

The Armorial Wijnbergen, also known as the Wijnbergen Roll, is a medieval French roll of arms. It is divided into two parts; the first, dated c. 1265–1270 has 256 coats of arms of the vassals of Louis IX of France (d. 1270) in the Île-de-France; the second part, dated c. 1280, has 1,056 coats of arms (for a total of 1,312) of the vassals of Philip III of France (r. 1270–1285) in his fiefs in the North of France, the Netherlands and the Rhineland.

The armorial is named for the Wijnbergen family, in whose possession it was acquired by the Royal Dutch Society for Genealogy and Heraldry. Its current whereabouts are unknown, but a copy is held in the Royal Library in Brussels (Collection Goethals, ms. 2569).
