= Diarmaid Mac an Bhaird =

Irish poet

Diarmaid Mac an Bhaird, fl. 1670, was an Irish poet.

A son of Laoiseach Mac an Bhaird, Diarmaid was a member of the Clann Mac an Bhaird and one of the last classically trained bardic file (poet). He appears to have lived in what is now County Monaghan though he clearly had associations with Clandeboye, as a poem he addressed to Cormac Ó Neill is preserved in Leabhar Cloinne Aodha Buidhe. He is also remembered for being involved in a poetic contention with Eoghan Ó Donnghaile of Tír Eógain as to which of them had the right to use the Red Hand of Ulster (see Flag of Ulster) as an emblem.
