= Coat of arms of Ulster =

Versions
- The banner of arms, which serves as provincial flag
- Armiger: Ulster
- Shield: Or, on a Cross Gules, an inescutcheon Argent, charged with a dexter hand erect aupaumee and couped at the wrist Gules

The coat of arms of Ulster consists of an inescutcheon Argent displaying a red hand, upon the coat of arms of the ancient Anglo-Norman and Hiberno-Norman noble dynasty, the House of Burgh.

It consists of the arms of the de Burgh dynasty, Earls of Ulster, combined with the Red Hand of Ulster, representing the medieval Irish over-kingdom of Ulaid, which the earldom of Ulster encompassed. The combination of them is blazoned Or, on a Cross Gules, an inescutcheon Argent, charged with a dexter hand erect aupaumee and couped at the wrist Gules.

It has since then become the Gaelic coat of arms for the province of Ulster.

== Design ==
=== Cross ===
The gold background features a red cross comes from the coat of arms of the Burkes, a Hiberno-Norman noble family.

=== Red hand ===
The inescutcheon featured a red, open hand, with the fingers pointing upwards, the thumb held parallel to the fingers, and the palm facing forward. This is known as the 'Red Hand of Ulster' (Irish: Lámh Dhearg Uladh), which is usually shown as a right hand, but is sometimes a left hand, such as in the coats of arms of baronets.

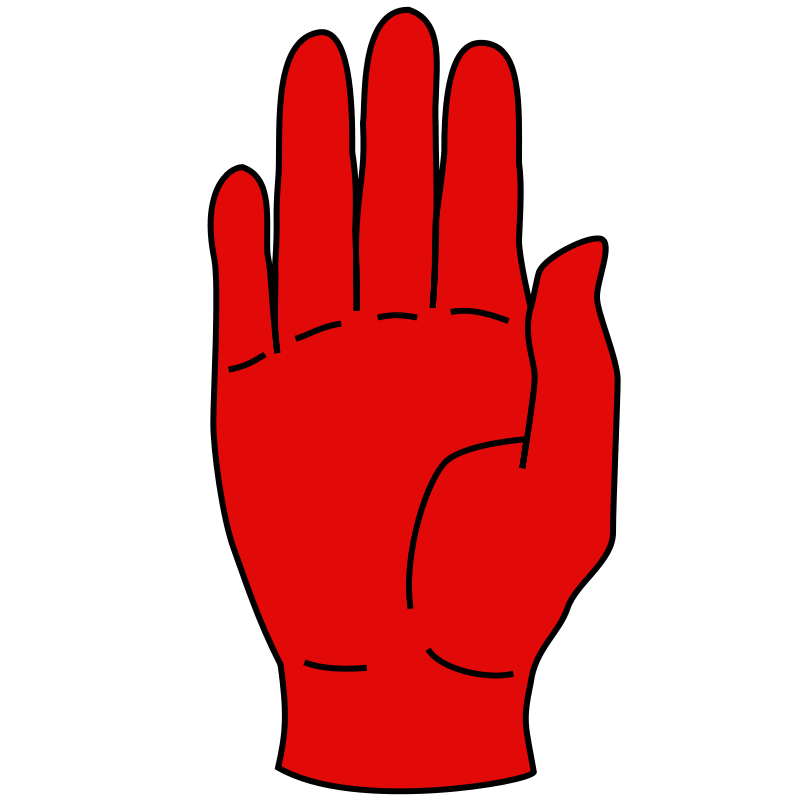
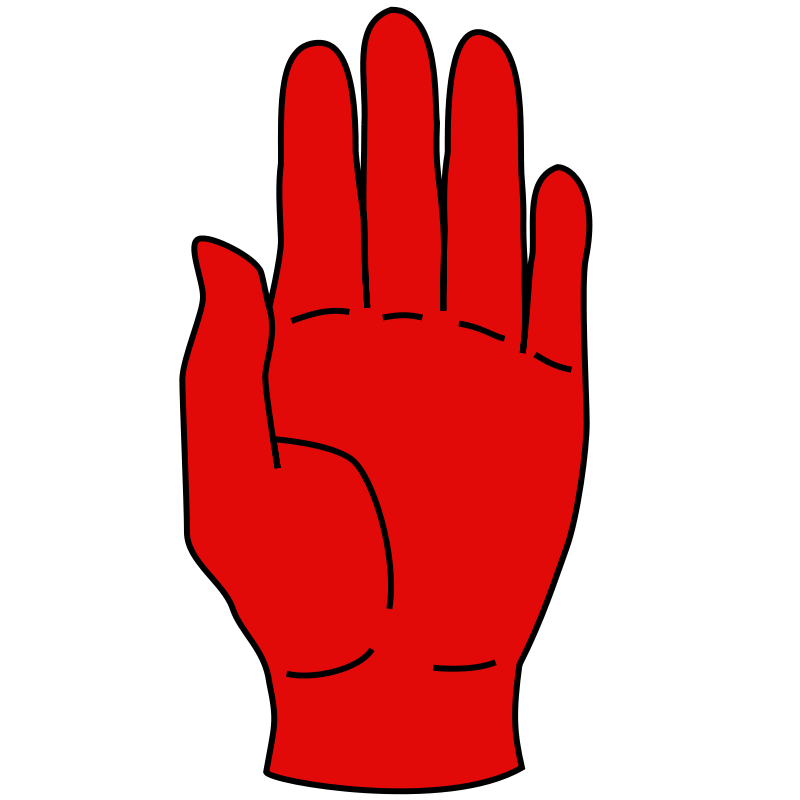
The Red Hand of Ulster, right and left hand versions

== History ==
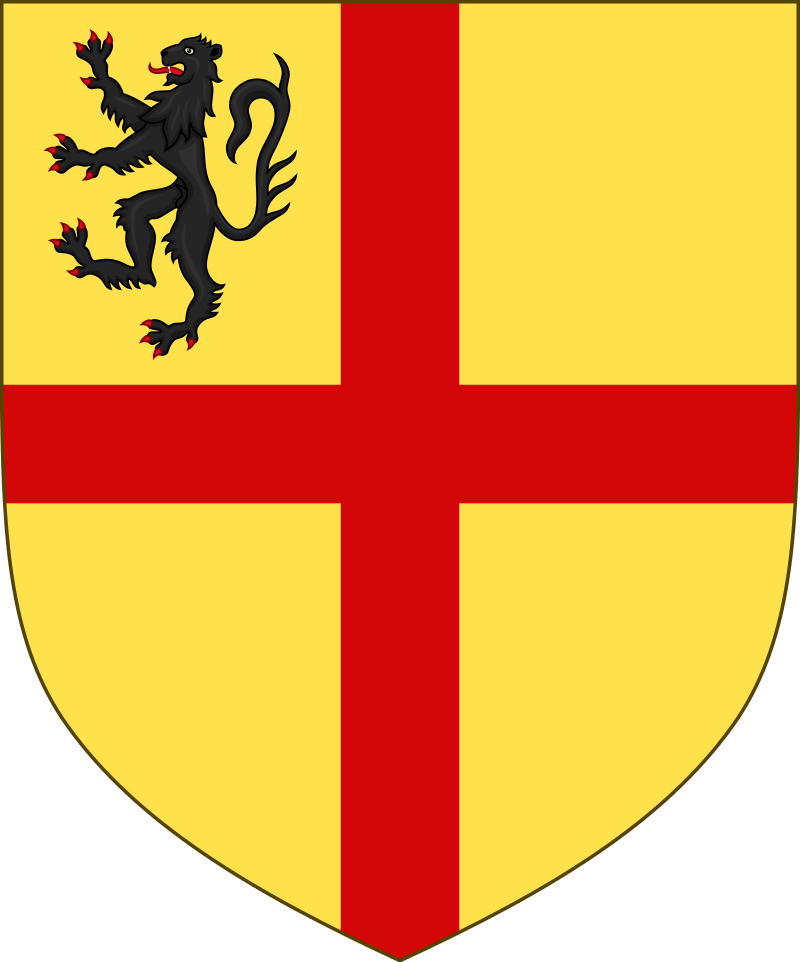
Arms of De Burgh

The arms of the historic province of Ulster is a composite achievement, combining the heraldic symbols of the cross of de Burgh and the red hand motif of the Irish over-kingdom of Ulaid, which later became associated with the O'Neills whose first use of it is dated to the mid-14th century.

When Walter de Burgh, Lord of Connacht, became Earl of Ulster in 1243, the de Burgh cross became inseparably linked with the Hiberno-Norman Earldom of Ulster, which spanned over a third of the north of Ireland. The seal of his son, Richard, for example, appended to a deed dated 1282, shows the heraldic cross in triplicate together with what may well be a portrait head of the Earl himself. At some point, the Red Hand motif was appended to the de Burgh cross, the result eventually coming to represent the entire province.

In the first half of the 17th century, the arms taken by the Vice-Admiral of Ulster imply that at that time, the arms of Ulster were simply a variation of the O'Neills': Argent a sinister hand couped at the wrist gules.

== Forms and uses ==
The arms of Ulster is usually displayed alongside the arms of Leinster, Munster, Connacht, or as part of the combined arms of the Provinces of Ireland. The arms is the official arms of the Ulster Gaelic Athletic Association and the Ulster rugby team, and is part of the IRFU four provinces arms and the Ireland hockey team arms.

Four Provinces Arms of Ireland

Ireland Rugby Union Arms

Ireland Hockey Team Arms

House flag of Irish Shipping (1947–1984)

== See also ==
- Saint Ultan
- Flag of Ulster
- Coat of arms of Northern Ireland
- Armorial of Ireland § Provinces
- House of Burgh, an Anglo-Norman and Hiberno-Norman dynasty founded in 1193
- de Burgh, surname
- Red Hand of Ulster Salute
