= Patrick Donnelly (bishop) =

Irish Roman Catholic bishop

- Bishop of Dromore
- Church: Catholic Church
- Diocese: Diocese of Dromore
- In office: 22 June 1697 – 1716
- Predecessor: Daniel Mackey
- Successor: Bernard MacMahon (as Administrator)

Orders
- Ordination: 1673 by Oliver Plunkett

Personal details
- Born: 1650 Desertcreat, County Tyrone, Kingdom of Ireland
- Died: 1716 (aged 65–66)

Patrick Donnelly (1650–1716) was an Irish Catholic Bishop known as The Bard of Armagh. He was born in Desertcreaght, Cookstown, County Tyrone in 1650 and died in 1716. His family was closely linked to the O'Neill dynasty. Donnelly ministered in the days of the Penal Laws while living as a fugitive.

He was descended from one of the celebrated Gaelic Clans of the previous era, the Clann Uí Dhonnghaile, who by the time of Bishop Donnelly’s great grandfather, Donall Gruama Ó Donnghaile, in the late 16th century, were closely linked to the ruling dynasty of the O’ Neills, with whom they claimed kinship.

Dr Donnelly's brother, Terence Donnelly also educated in Paris, served as Bishop of Derry.

- Dr Patrick Donnelly ministered in South Armagh,
- He assumed the title of Phelim Brady, the Bard of Armagh
- Educated by the Jesuits at their hedge school in Drogheda.
- Studied at the Irish College in Paris sometime between 1673 and 1679, gaining a Doctorate in Law
- Bishop of Dromore, appointed 22 July 1697; served until 1716

Eoghan Ó Donnghaile, author of Comhairle Mhic Clámha and Mo choin do theacht Fheidhlime.., may have written the latter as a salutation to Donnelly, his kinsman.
