= Ellerbe Becket =

American architectural practice

- Founded: 1909; 117 years ago
- Fate: Acquired by AECOM
- Headquarters: Minneapolis, Minnesota, United States
- Number of locations: Dallas, Kansas City, San Francisco, Washington, D.C., Dubai, Doha
- Services: Architecture, Interiors, Graphics, Planning

Ellerbe Becket was an American Minneapolis, Minnesota-based architectural, engineering, interior design and construction firm until 2009, when it was acquired by AECOM.

The firm formerly employed 475 people in seven locations and three countries, and had designed buildings in all of the 50 states and in 20 countries.

== History ==
The company originally called Ellerbe & Co. was founded by Franklin Ellerbe in 1909 in St. Paul, Minnesota. Its first clients included the Mayo Clinic and 3M. Thomas Ellerbe took over the company in 1921 upon his father's death. When he retired in 1966 it became an employee-owned company. In 1988 it merged with Welton Becket and Associates of Los Angeles and became Ellerbe Becket. In 1988 it opened a sports design division in Kansas City. On October 26, 2009, Ellerbe Becket joined the architecture, planning, and engineering firm AECOM.

== Projects ==
=== General buildings ===
- Ronald Reagan Building, Washington, D.C.
- Carlson School of Management – University of Minnesota, Minneapolis, MN
- Kingdom Centre, Riyadh, Saudi Arabia
- Target Plaza South and North, Minneapolis, MN
- Science Museum of Minnesota St. Paul, MN
- Brasil Telecom Data Center, Brasília, Brazil
- Charles Evans Whittaker Federal Courthouse, Kansas City, MO
- University of Notre Dame: Hesburgh Library, (1963), O'Shaughnessy Hall (1953), North Dining Hall (1957), Keenan Hall and Stanford Hall (1957), Stepan Center (1962), Lewis Hall (1965), Galvin Life Science (1967), Grace and Flanner Halls (1969), Fitzpatrick Hall of Engineering (1974), Snite Museum of Art (1980), Pasquerilla West (1980), Pasquerilla East (1981), Stepan Chemistry Hall (1982), Decio Faculty Hall (1984), Siegfried Hall (1988), Knott Hall (1988), Pasquerilla Center (1990), Ricci Band Building (1990), Hesburgh Center for International Studies (1991), DeBartolo Hall (1992), Mendoza College of Business (1996), O'Neill Hall (1996), Keough Hall (1996), McGlinn Hall (1997), Welsh Family Hall (1997)

=== Health care ===
- Yonsei University Medical Center – Severance Hospital, Seoul, Korea
- Khalifa Sport City – Orthopedic Sports Medicine Hospital, Doha, Qatar This is now Aspetar
- Walt Disney Memorial Cancer Institute, Orlando, FL
- Mercy Medical Center, Baltimore, MD
- Mayo Clinic, Rochester, MN
- Plummer Building, Rochester, MN recognized on the National Register of Historic Places
- Sanford Health, Sioux Falls, SD
- St. Luke's Hospital Nassif Heart Center, Cedar Rapids, IA
- St. Rita's Medical Center, Lima, OH
- Stonewall Jackson Hospital, Lexington, VA
- Gonda Building, Rochester, MN
- Regions Hospital (2009 expansion & cafeteria renovation), St. Paul, MN
- Mercy Clinic and Hospital (expansion 1950s), Oskaloosa, Iowa

=== Residential Structures ===
Due to the relationship between Franklin Ellerbe, Mayo Clinic co-founder William James Mayo, and builder Garfield Schwartz at the turn of the 20th century, Ellerbe's residential portfolio exists almost exclusively in Rochester, Minnesota.

- Plummer House, Rochester, MN recognized on the National Register of Historic Places
- Pill Hill Residential Historic District, Rochester, MN (approximately 30 homes) recognized on the National Register of Historic Places. See List of Residences in Pill Hill Historic District, Rochester, Minnesota.
- Dr. William J. Mayo House, Rochester, MN recognized on the National Register of Historic Places
- Dr. Donald C. Balfour House, Rochester, MN recognized on the National Register of Historic Places

=== Sports facilities ===
The following were designed by the Kansas City Sports Venue branch

==== Stadiums ====
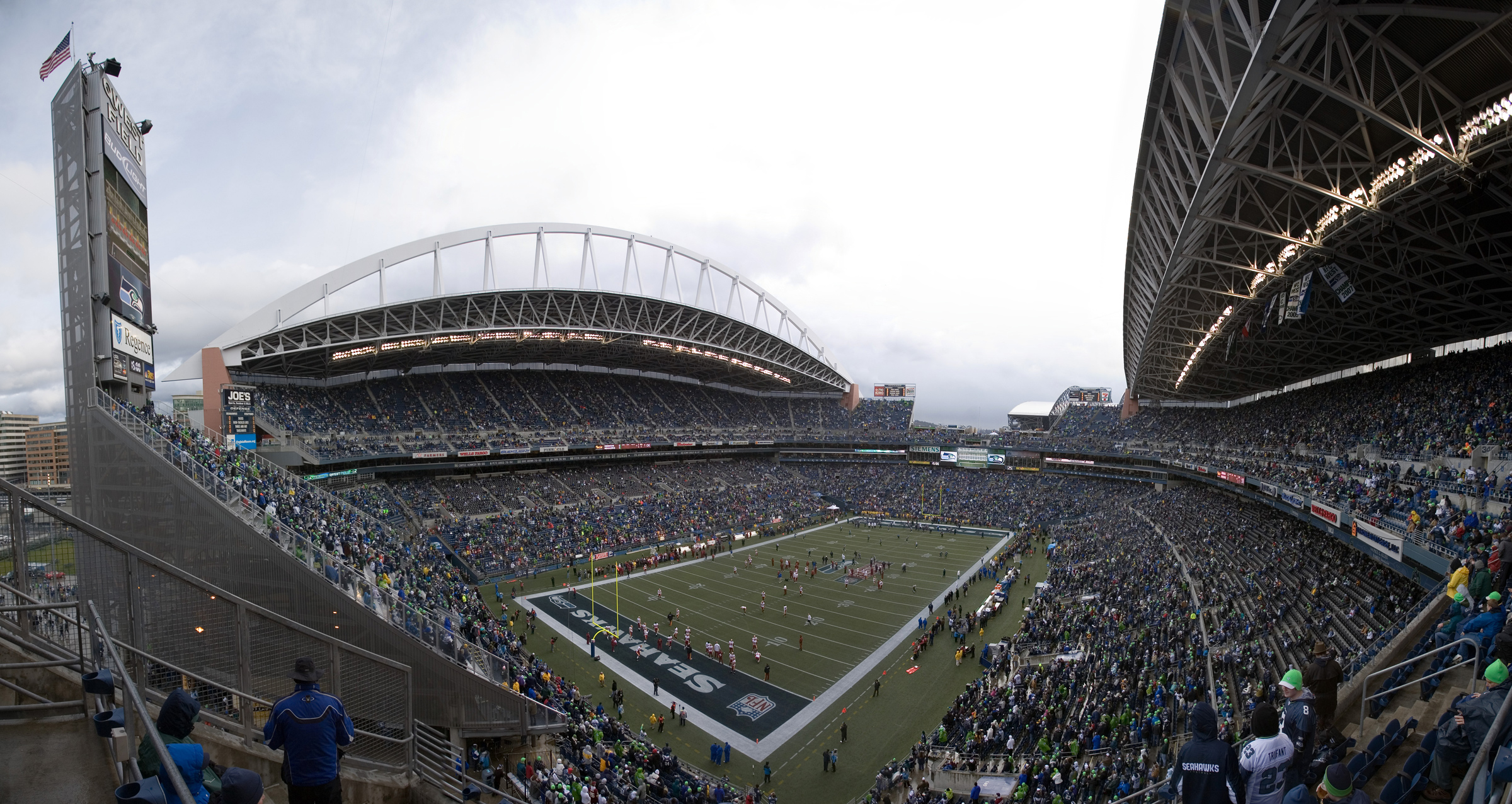
Lumen Field

- Notre Dame Stadium (and renovation), Notre Dame, IN
- Lumen Field, Seattle, WA
- Centennial Olympic Stadium/Turner Field (now Georgia State Stadium), Atlanta, GA
- Faurot Field (renovation), Columbia, MO
- Guangdong Olympic Stadium, Guangzhou, China
- Lambeau Field (renovation), Green Bay, WI
- Rentschler Field, East Hartford, CT
- Rhodes Stadium, Elon, NC
- Chase Field, Phoenix, AZ
- Autzen Stadium (renovation), Eugene, OR
- S.B. Ballard Stadium (formerly Foreman Field), (renovation), Norfolk, VA
- Sam Boyd Stadium (renovation), Las Vegas, NV
- Johnny Unitas Stadium (renovation), Towson, MD
- Innovative Field, (formerly Frontier Field), Rochester, NY
- O'Shaughnessy Stadium, Saint Paul, MN

==== Arenas ====
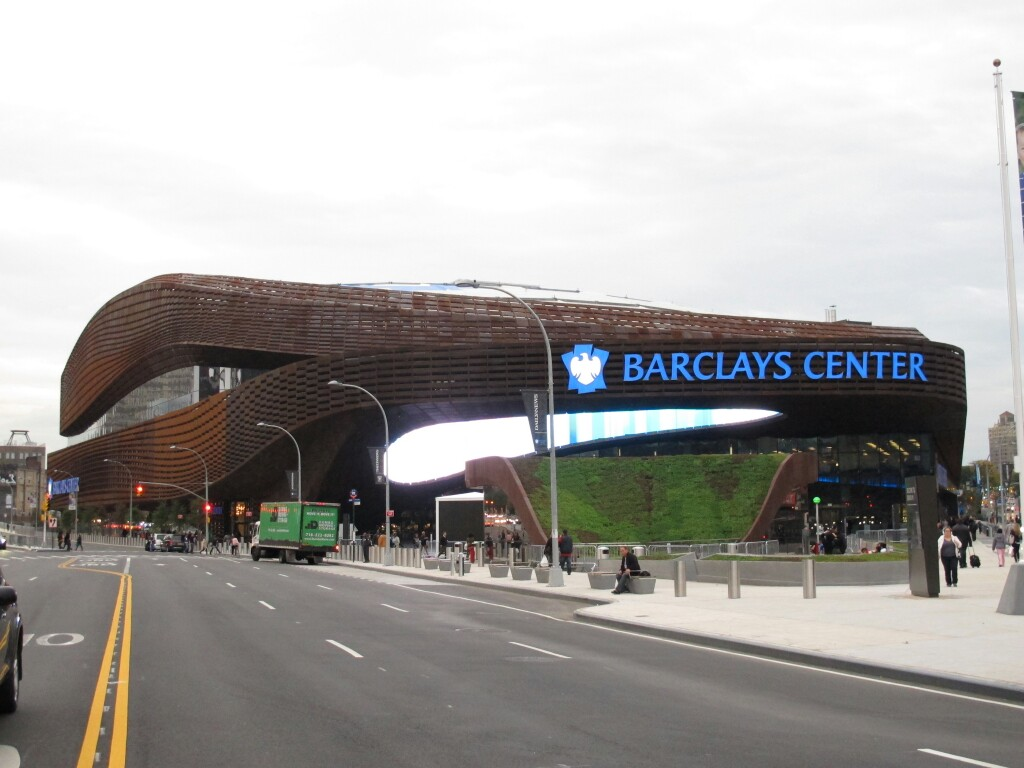
Barclays Center

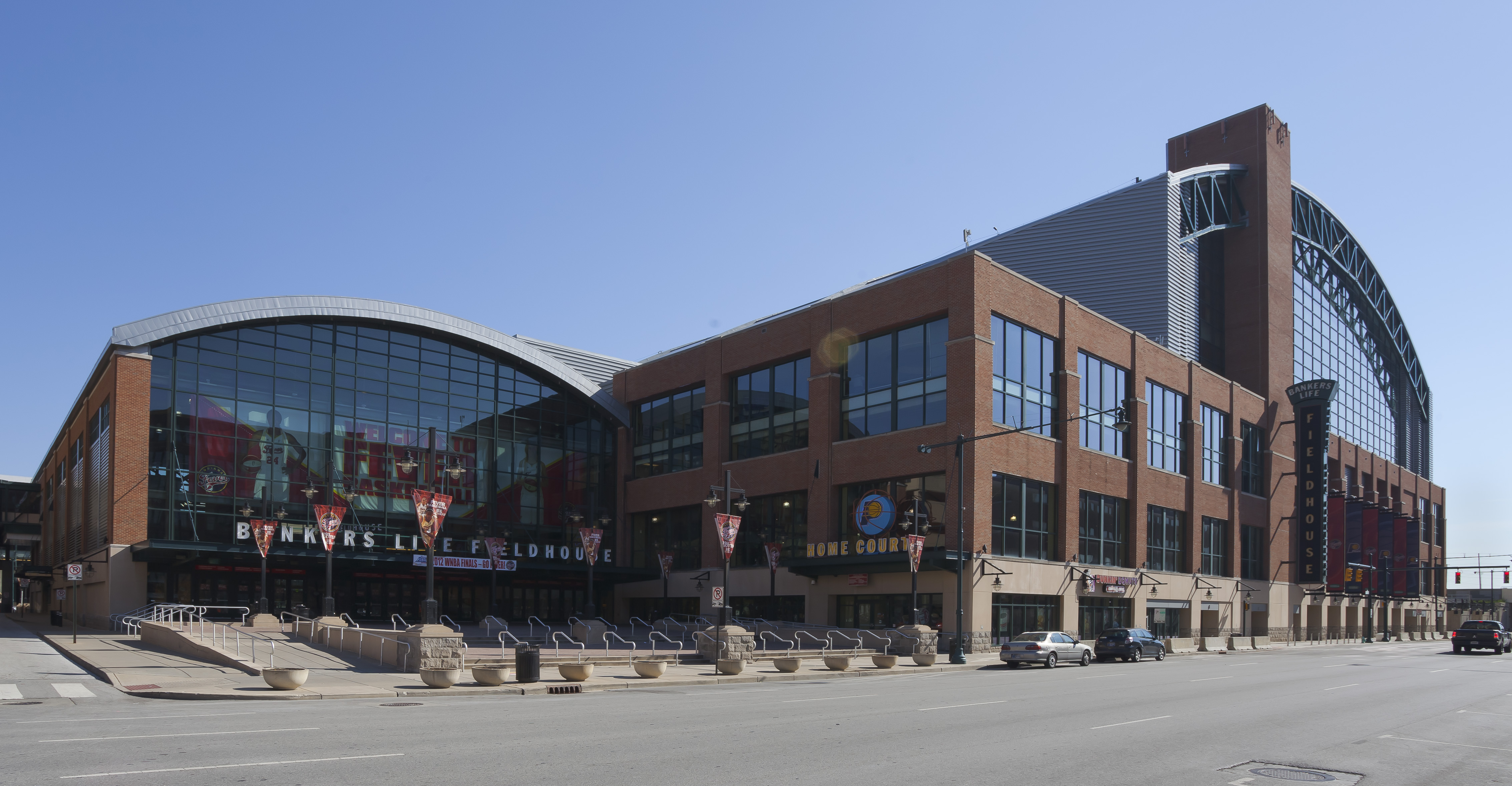
Gainbridge Fieldhouse

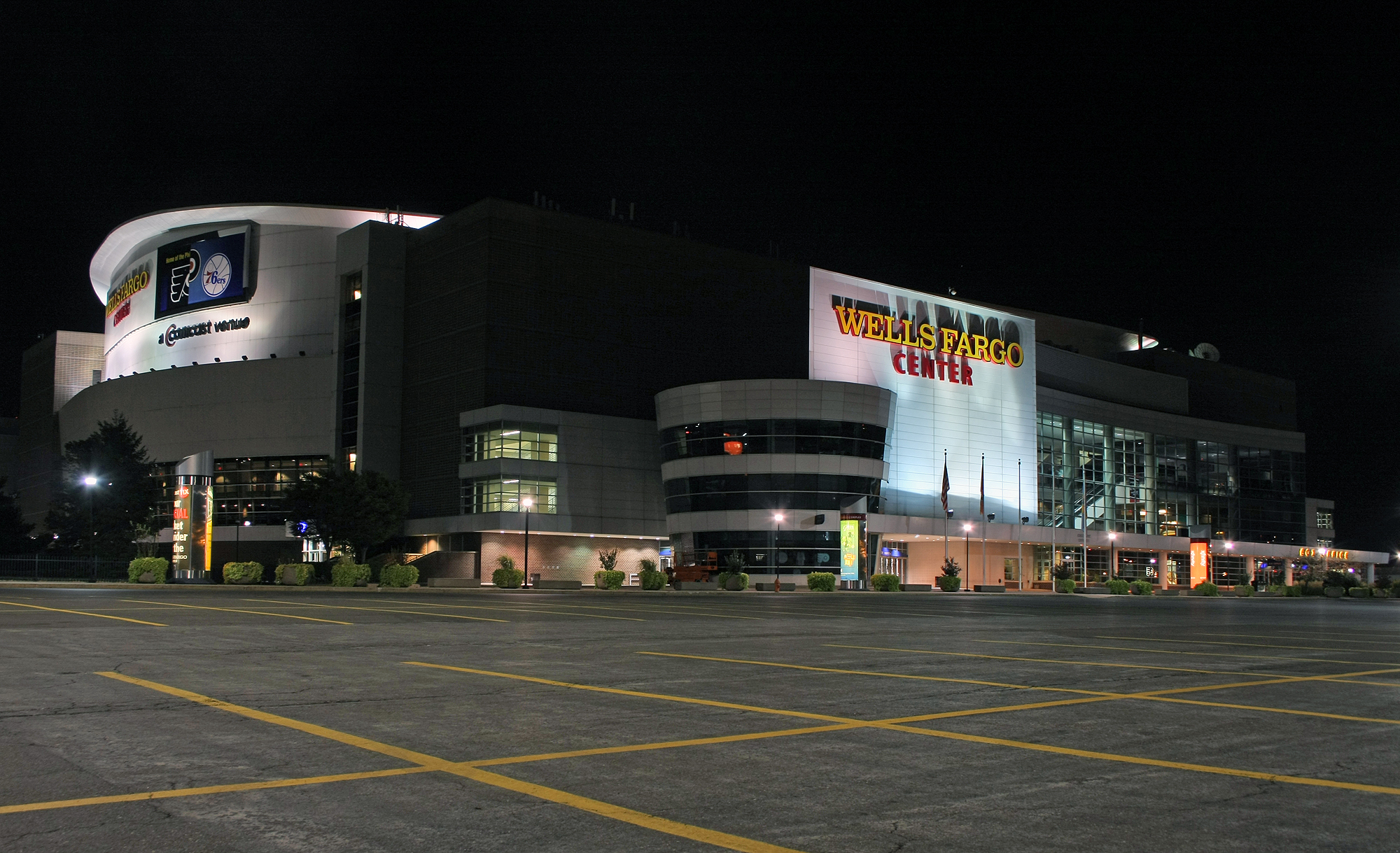
Xfinity Mobile Arena

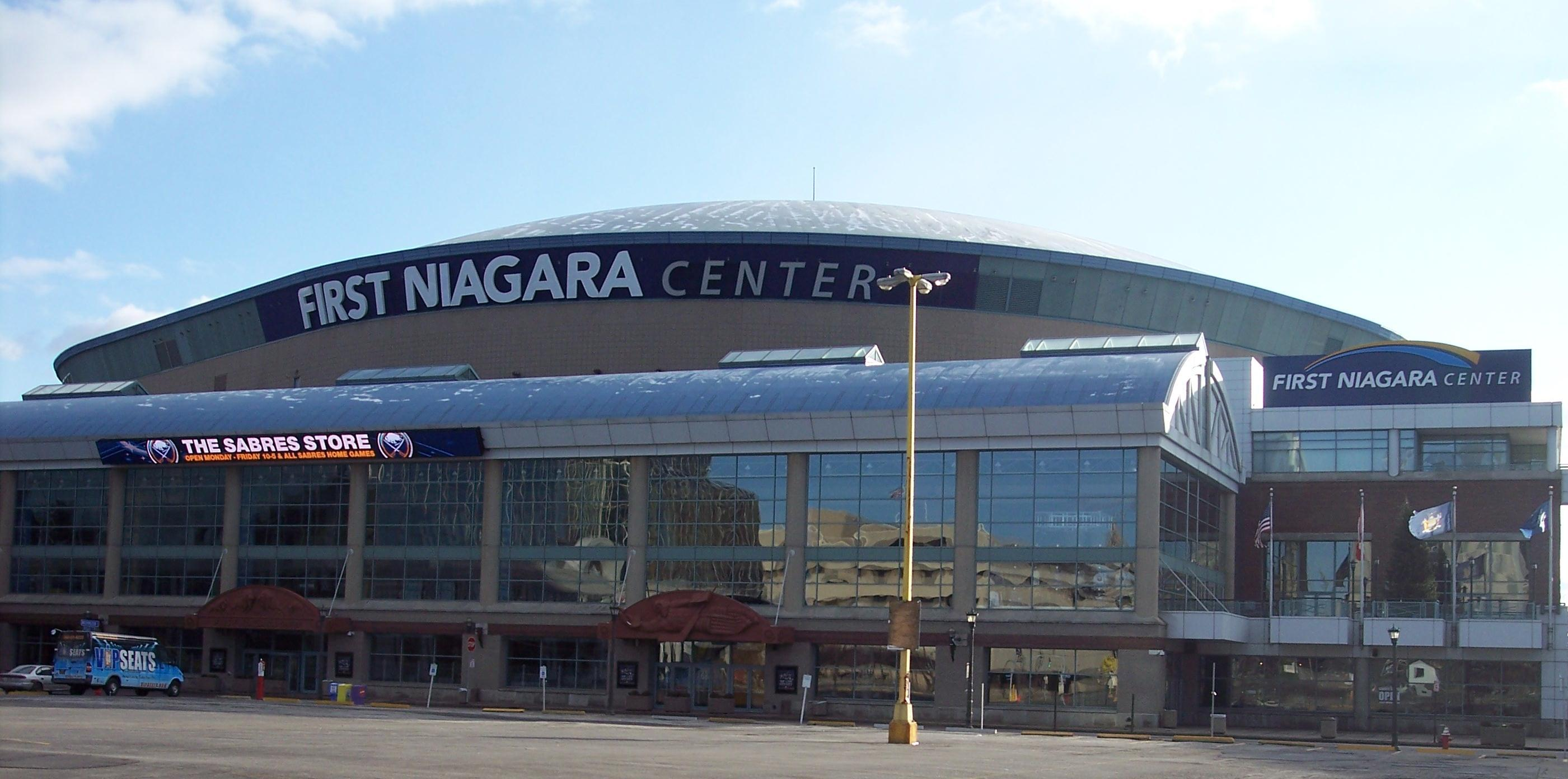
KeyBank Center, Buffalo, New York

- Frost Bank Center (formerly SBC Center and AT&T Center), San Antonio, TX
- Barclays Center, Brooklyn, NY
- Amerant Bank Arena (formerly Office Depot Center, BB&T Center, National Car Rental Center, BankAtlantic Center, and FLA Live Arena), Sunrise, FL
- Amica Mutual Pavilion (formerly Dunkin' Donuts Center and Providence Civic Center), Providence, RI
- FedExForum, Memphis, TN
- Gainbridge Fieldhouse, (formerly Conseco Fieldhouse and Bankers Life Fieldhouse), Indianapolis, IN
- Great Southern Bank Arena, (formerly JQH Arena), Springfield, MO
- John Paul Jones Arena, Charlottesville, VA
- Joyce Center, (formerly Athletic & Convocation Center), Notre Dame, IN
- KeyBank Center, (formerly First Niagara Center, HSBC Arena, and Marine Midland Arena), Buffalo, NY
- Rudolf Weber-Arena, (formerly Arena Oberhausen and König-Pilsener-Arena), Oberhausen, Germany
- Madison Square Garden, New York City, New York (1990s renovation)
- Manchester Arena (formerly Manchester Evening News Arena), Manchester, England
- Matthew Knight Arena, Eugene, OR
- Moda Center (formerly Rose Garden), Portland, OR
- Rocket Arena (formerly Gund Arena, Quicken Loans Arena, and Rocket Mortgage FieldHouse), Cleveland, OH
- Saitama Super Arena, Saitama, Japan
- Enterprise Center (formerly Scottrade Center, Savvis Center, and Kiel Center), St. Louis, MO
- Spokane Veterans Memorial Arena, Spokane, WA
- T-Mobile Center, (formerly Sprint Center), Kansas City, MO
- Benchmark International Arena, (formerly Amalie Arena, Tampa Bay Times Forum, St. Pete Times Forum, and Ice Palace), Tampa, FL
- Vibrant Arena at The MARK, (formerly The MARK of the Quad Cities, i Wireless Center, and TaxSlayer Center), Moline, Illinois
- Mortgage Matchup Center (formerly PHX Arena, Footprint Center, Talking Stick Resort Arena, America West Arena, and US Airways Center), Phoenix, AZ
- TD Garden (formerly TD Banknorth Garden, and FleetCenter), Boston, MA
- Thomas & Mack Center, Paradise, NV
- Capital One Arena (formerly MCI Center and Verizon Center), Washington, D.C.
- Xfinity Mobile Arena (formerly CoreState Center, First Union Center, Wachovia Center, and Wells Fargo Center), Philadelphia, PA
- XFINITY Center (formerly Comcast Center), College Park, MD
