= Pasquerilla West Hall (University of Notre Dame) =

Residence hall at the University of Notre Dame

Pasquerilla West
- Residence Hall
- University of Notre Dame
- Coat of arms of Pasquerilla West
- Campus quad: Mod
- Coordinates: 41.703887°N 86.235007°W
- Nickname: PW, P-Dub
- Motto: Peace, Love, P-Dub
- Established: 1981
- Architect: Ellerbe Associates
- Architectural style: Modernism
- Colors: Purple and white
- Gender: Female
- Rector: Annie Boyle
- Benefactor: Frank and Sylvia Pasquerilla
- Undergraduates: 256
- Chapel: Saint Clare of Assisi
- Mascot: Purple Weasels
- Sports: TBD
- Charities: TBD
- Major events: Queen Week, PDub's Closet, Women's Empowerment Week, Carnation Sale
- Website: Site

Map
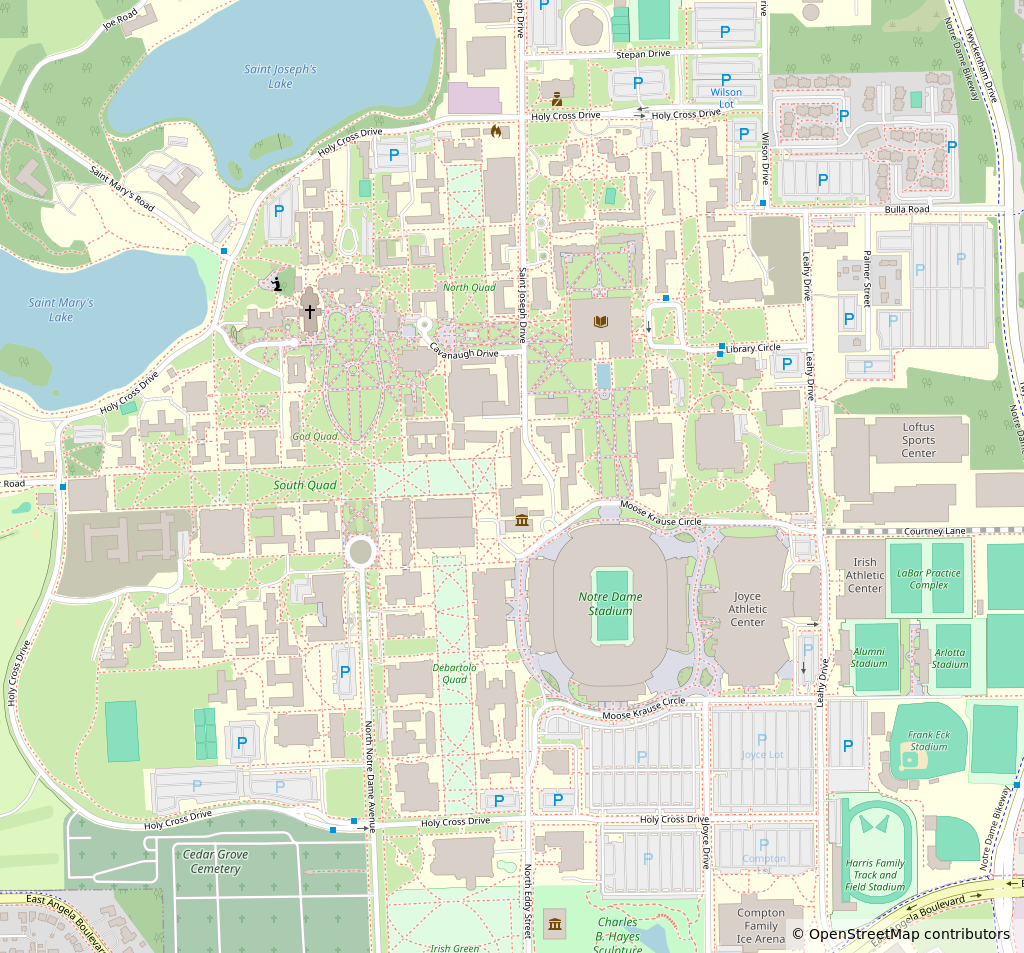
- Location within Notre Dame, Indiana

Pasquerilla West is one of the 33 Residence Halls on the campus of the University of Notre Dame and one of the 15 dorms for women students. It is commonly known as PW or P-Dub. It is located on Mod Quad, between North Dining Hall and its twin dorm Pasquerilla East Hall.

== History ==
Pasquerilla West Hall was built in 1981 as a gift from Frank J. and Sylvia Pasquerilla. PW and its twin, Pasquerilla East, initially were built with the expectation that Pasquerilla's twin daughters would each occupy one of the halls during their senior years. At the time, the couple's donation of $7 million was the largest in the school's history by a living person. Initially, Frank Pasquerilla wanted the gift to be anonymous, but Fr. Theodore Hesburgh convinced him to disclose his name since it might attract other donors.

The two halls were dedicated on November 13 and 14, 1981, with a series of events attended by Frank J. and Sylvia Pasquerilla and the inaugural residents of the halls. The events included a Dedication Musicale, Italian opera music program held in the library auditorium, a show of Italian art in the Snite Museum of Art, culminating in the "festa di Pasquerilla," an Italian cuisine luncheon in Stepan Center.

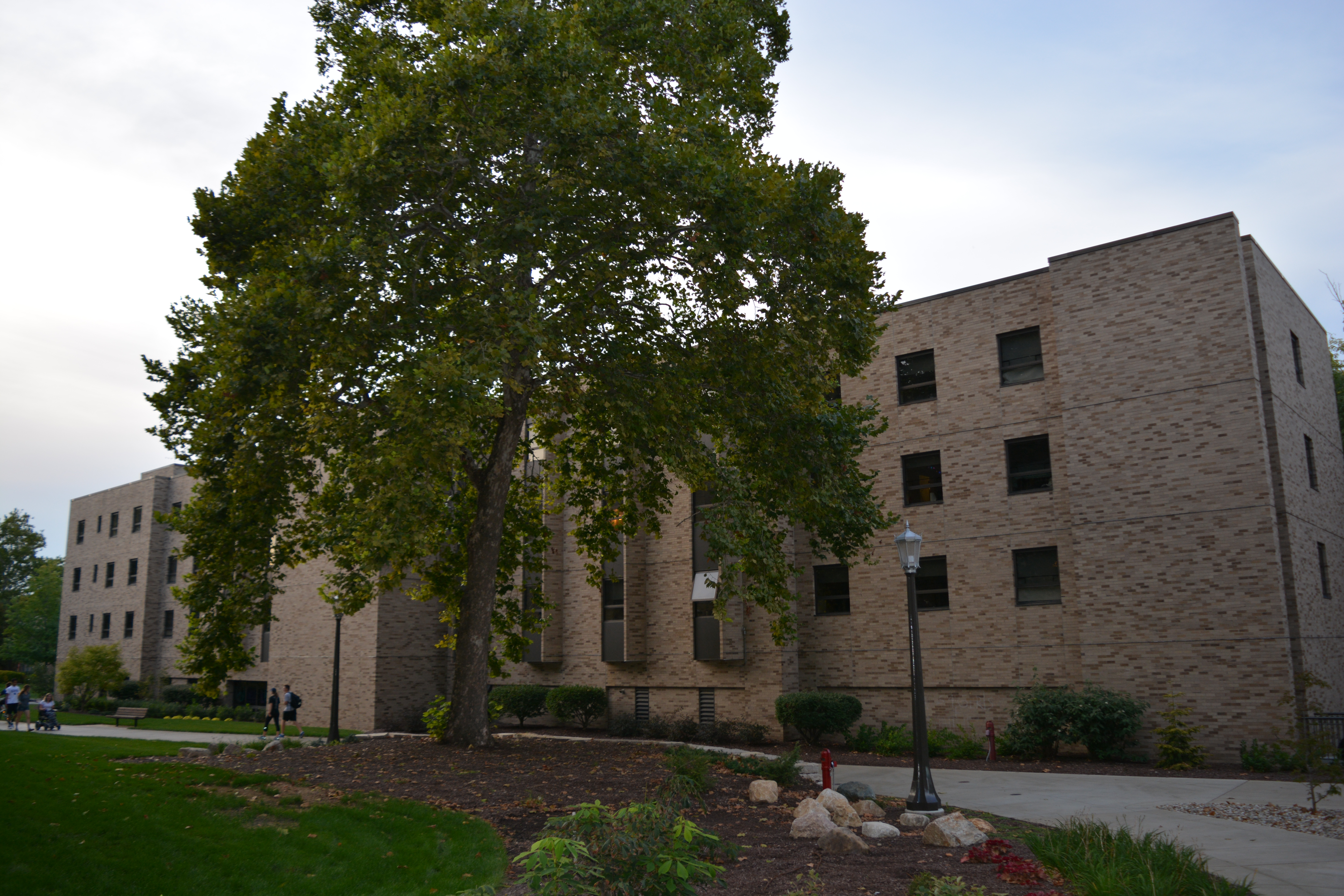
Pasquerilla West

Frank J Pasquerilla was an entrepreneur of Italian descent from Johnstown, Pennsylvania. He was the president in 1953 and eventually sole owner in 1961 of Crown American construction company, and later invested in shopping malls and hotels. Frank Pasquerilla was a philanthropist for many cultural institutions in the Johnstown areas such as the University of Pittsburgh at Johnstown and for many Catholic colleges, including Georgetown University and St. Francis College and was Knight Commander of the Order of St. Gregory the Great.

The current rector is Emily Orsini, who graduated from Lourdes University with a bachelor's degree in interdisciplinary studies and the University of Toledo with a master's degree in higher education. PDub most recently won Women's Hall of the Year in the 2022–2023 academic year.

== Features ==
Pasquerilla West was the first dorm that was built to house undergraduate women, along with its twin Pasquerilla East. Originally, the two dorms were planned to have a shared chapel, but the idea was scrapped and the chapel in the hall was carved out of a common area. It was also the first dorm to be equipped with air conditioning. Its inhabitants are known as "Purple Weasels," but before the 1990s they were known as "Plaid Wave" or the "Pink Wizards."

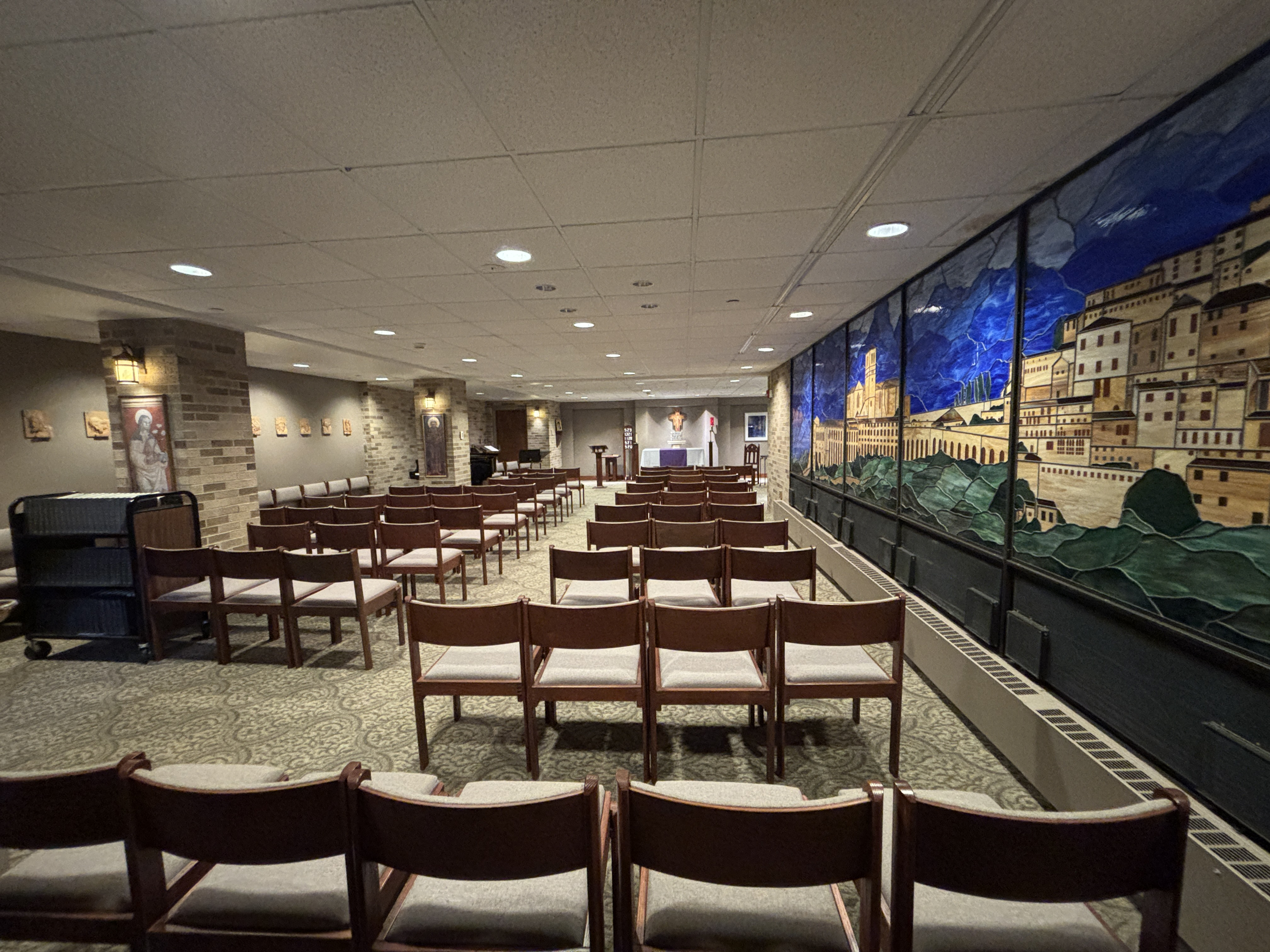
Chapel of St. Clare of Assisi in Pasquerilla West Hall

The chapel is dedicated to Saint Clare of Assisi, and an entire wall of stained glass depicting the Basilica of St. Francis of Assisi in Assisi, Italy was completed in 1998.

== Traditions ==
Pasquerilla West's signature event is called Queen Week. Every section of PW participates in a number of events and at the end of the week, a freshman in the winning section becomes the queen of the dorm.

Another event PW has is PDub's Closet. Every fall, members of the dorm collect gently used clothes from across campus, and students who donate can choose to get some new-to-you clothing items or win some raffle prizes. All proceeds and unexchanged clothes, along with all winter coats, are donated to the local homeless shelter.

PDub's carnation sale is the longest standing tradition in the dorm. During the week of Valentine's Day, ND students are able to purchase carnations to be delivered to anyone on campus's door. All proceeds go to St. Margaret's House, a day shelter for women and their families based in South Bend.

Women's Empowerment Week, the newest signature event, is held throughout a week in March to celebrate and empower women across campus.

== Notable residents ==
- Jacqueline Batteast '05
- Devereaux Peters '11
