= O'Neill Family Hall (University of Notre Dame) =

University of Notre Dame residence hall

Coordinates: 41.698024°N 86.241873°W

- University of Notre Dame
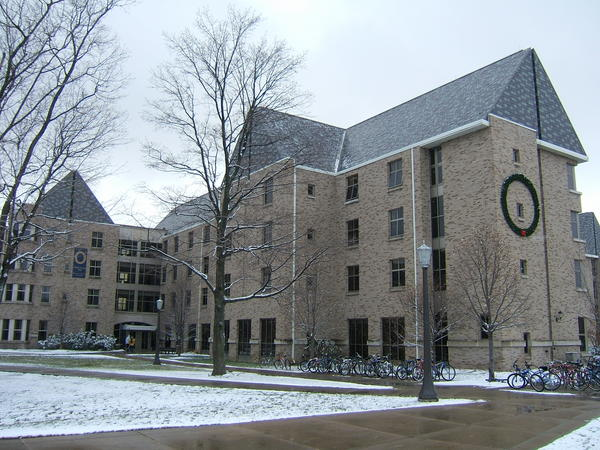

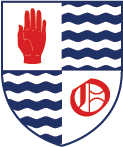
- Campus quad: West
- Motto: Fratres in Unum (Latin)
- Established: 1996
- Colors: Blue, Red, and Silver
- Gender: Male
- Rector: Fr. Mike Ryan, C.S.C.
- Undergraduates: 274
- Chapel: St. Joseph the Worker
- Mascot: The Angry Mob
- Sports: Baseball, Basketball, Bowling, Cross Country, Dodgeball, Football, Golf, Hockey, Lacrosse, Racquetball, Soccer, Table Tennis, Tennis, Volleyball, O'Lympics, Regatta
- Charities: South Bend Center for the Homeless
- Major events: Miss ND Pageant, VB for a Cause, Mardi Gras (terminated), 40 Yards for a Cause
- Website: oneill.nd.edu

O'Neill Family Hall is one of the 33 residence halls on the campus of the University of Notre Dame and one of the 17 male dorms. Built in 1996, the dormitory was funded by the O'Neill family from Midland, Texas.

== History ==
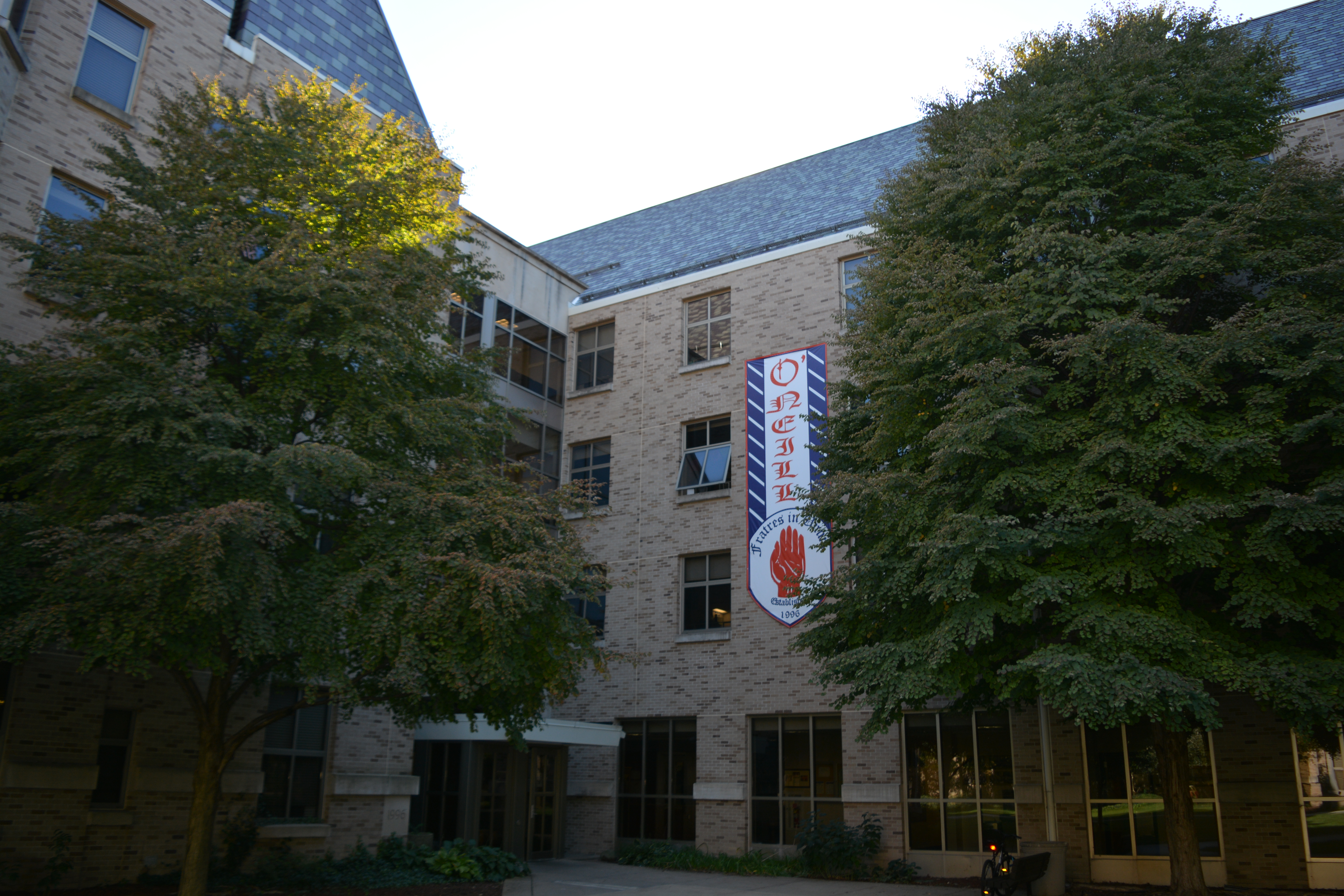
O'Neill Hall main entrance

Established in 1996, O'Neill became both the first residence hall built on West Quad and the first residence hall constructed for men since Flanner and Grace Halls were built in 1969. The construction of halls on West Quad served to relocate students from Flanner and Grace. These two dorms, which each contained more than 500 students and spanned 11 floors, were converted into faculty, administration, and office space. The majority of Grace residents went to either O'Neill or Keough. The four new dorms (O'Neill, Keough, Welsh Family, and McGlinn) built on West Quad were all of similar plan and build, each consisting mostly of double with some single and triple rooms, and hosting between 262 and 282 students. O’Neill has 2 quads per section, and the rest of the rooms are singles or doubles.O'Neill most recently won Hall of the Year in the 2022–2023 academic year.

The move from Grace Hall is represented in the O'Neill mascot, the Angry Mob. Some students, angry about the relocation, held a series of bonfires in protest. When the time came to choose a mascot for O'Neill, residents decided to carry on the memory of their former dorm by naming themselves the Angry Mob. Once established and filled with angry students, O'Neill quickly became known for its signature event, Mardi Gras, which was later terminated by the university.

== Description ==
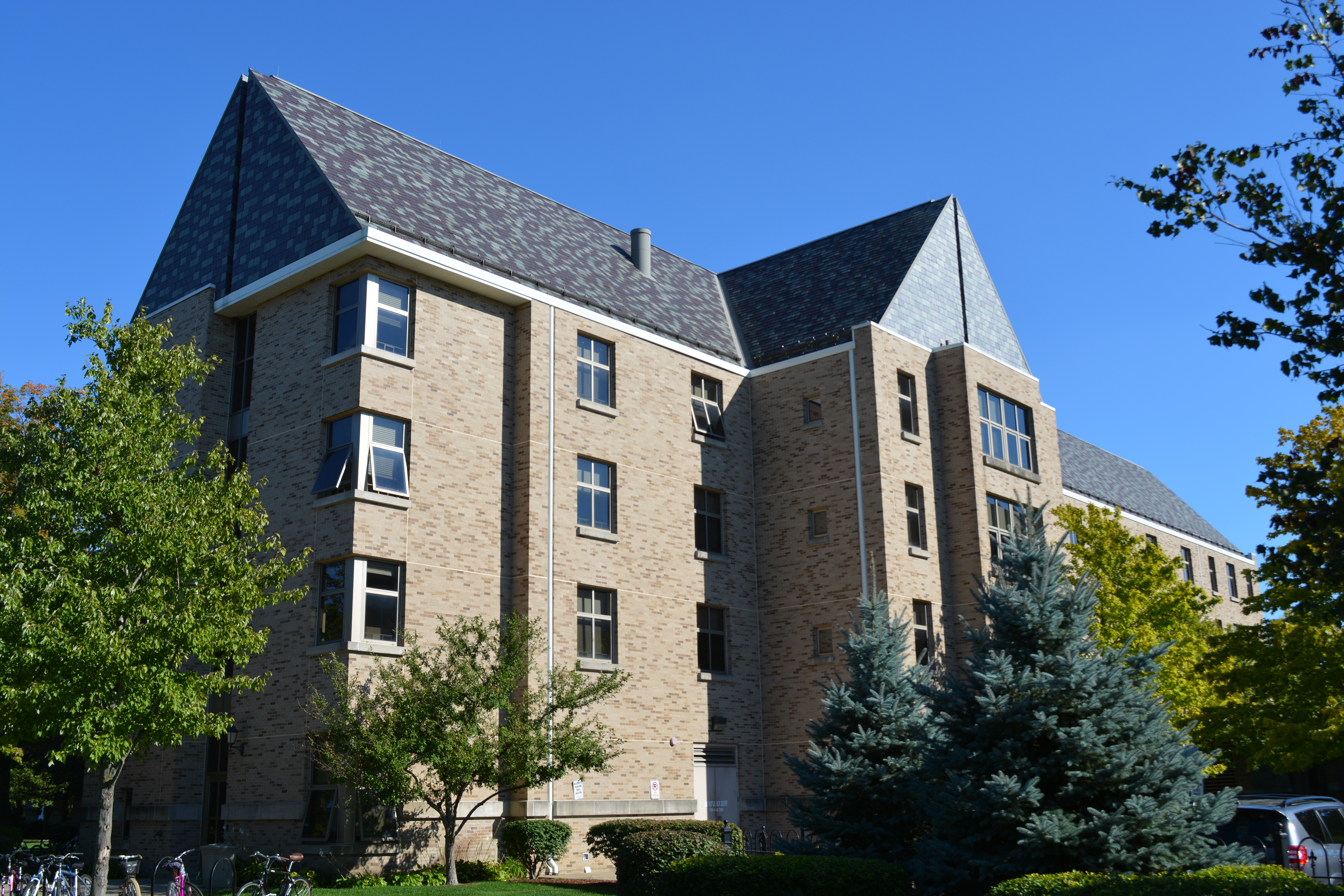
O'Neill Hall viewed from West Quad

O'Neill Hall features 7 residential sections (two for each floor with the exception of one section on the first floor). O'Neill has 24-hour social spaces, study areas, laundry facilities on the first floor, and TV lounges on each floor. It also has an exercise room, a chapel dedicated to Saint Joseph the Worker, air conditioning, and modular furniture. A student-run restaurant operates Sunday through Thursday nights. The restaurant was formerly named “Spanky’s”, but due to some controversy has been renamed to “The O’ven”. The floor plan is identical to that of Welsh Family Hall.

=== Coat of arms ===
The O'Neill coat of arms presents the name of the hall, and the year of its founding, along with two Latin quotes. On the lower left, the words “Mobilium turba Quiritium” come from Horace (65BC – 8BC), the leading Roman poet of his time, and are literally translated as “a crowd of inconsistent citizens,” but are thought to be the origin of the word “mob.” O’Neill Hall's nickname on campus is “The Mob.” On the lower right side are the words “Fratres in Unum,” which translates from Latin as “Brothers as One.” The name “O’Neill” literally means “champion,” and the red hand on the upper left side of the shield is a symbol of the O’Neill family motto, “the red hand of Ireland in defiance,” sometimes given as “the red hand of Ireland forever.” The Coat of Arms contains the Red hand of Ulster, part of the coat of arms of the O'Neill family, who donated the dorm, since the 14th century.

== Notable events/activities ==
- Hanging of Christmas wreath "O".
- Mardi Gras: Terminated by the university, this event was a dorm-wide event celebrated the weekend before the beginning of Lent. The event was later cancelled due to pressure from the university and as noted by then rector, Ed Mack, "It got out of hand."
- In October, the dorm hosts “Without a Home,” an all-night vigil to raise awareness and funds to aid the South Bend Center for the Homeless. Sunday Mass collections are donated to the center as well.
- O'Neill's signature event is the Miss ND Pageant, in which contestants from each female dorm compete for the title of "Miss ND." Proceeds from the event benefit the South Bend Center for the Homeless.
- At the end of the annual section football season, as the best section football teams from O'Neill and Keough play each other for the right to hold the Grace Cup. This is in remembrance of the fact that students from O'Neill and Keough relocated from the defunct Grace Hall.
- Every fall the dorm organizes and hosts a fundraiser called 40 yards for a cause. At the fundraiser people can pay to run a laser-timed 40 yard dash on south quad. Additionally, men of O’ Neill hall cook food and sell dorm merchandise. All of the proceeds of the event go to the South Bend Center for the homeless.

== Notable former residents ==
- Kyle McAlarney, former Notre Dame basketball player
- Kyle Rudolph, starting Tight End on Minnesota Vikings
- Justin Tuck, former NFL Defensive Lineman and Super Bowl Champion with the New York Giants
- Darius Walker
- David Givens
- Geoff Price
- Maurice Stovall
- Austin Swift
- Jason Zimbler
- Hunter Smith
- Tyler Buchner, former Notre Dame football and lacrosse player.
- Cam Hart, former Notre Dame football player and cornerback on the LA Chargers.
- Mike Ryan, Current rector of O’Neill Family hall.

== Other sources ==
- Notre Dame Office of Housing Profile for O'Neill Hall
- ND Magazine
- "tour.nd.edu/locations/o-neill-hall/". tour.nd.edu. Archived from the original on 2019-04-25.
