= Flag of Ulster =

- Design: A red cross on a gold background, defaced by a white escutcheon bearing a red hand.

The flag of Ulster, a province of the island of Ireland, consists of a red cross on a gold background with a red hand on a white shield in the centre.

== History ==
Coat of arms of the House of Burgh

The flag of Ulster came about when Walter de Burgh was granted the Earldom of Ulster in 1264. He merged the family arms (heraldry) of the ancient Anglo-Norman and Hiberno-Norman noble dynasty, the House of Burgh (which was a red cross on a yellow background) with that of the Red Hand of Ulster of the Irish over-kingdom of Ulaid, which the earldom encompassed.

The de Burgh family heraldry is said to have come about after Hubert de Burgh, 1st Earl of Kent had fought in the Third Crusade but had no coat of arms himself. He carried a gold coloured shield into battle. Following a battle, King Richard the Lionheart of England gave de Burgh a coat of arms by dipping his finger into the blood of a Saracen slain at the feet of de Burgh and marked a red cross onto de Burgh's shield; stating "for your bravery, this shall be your crest".

The origin of the Red Hand of Ulster however is shrouded in mystery, with a popular legend saying that in the race to claim the kingship of Ulster, the first man to lay his hand on the province would have claim to it. This led one man to chop off his hand and throw it over his comrades.

There was dispute throughout the early modern period over which Irish clan had the right to it. Either the Magennises who were the ruling dynasty of the Uí Echach Cobo, part of the original Ulaid, or the O'Neill's, the ruling dynasty of the Cenél nEógain, who after 1317 claimed the kingship of Ulaid for the first time. Eventually in 1908 the then head of the O'Neill clan admitted that it originally belonged to the Magennises.

There is often debate as to if a dexter (right) or sinister (left) hand is to be used on the flag. Whilst usually a right hand is used on the flag, several organisations such as the former 36th (Ulster) Division that also used a left hand. The symbols also appear in heraldry for some of the counties of Ulster. The counties of Antrim, Fermanagh, Londonderry and Tyrone all use a right red hand in their coats of arms. County Louth also use a right hand but theirs is white skin coloured as it symbolises the hand of God rather than the red hand of Ulster.

== Colours ==
One interpretation of the colours gold, red, and white is certified by the British Flag Institute, in agreement with Vexillology Ireland.

Scheme	Gold	Red	White
Pantone	Gold 123	Red 485	White
HEX	#FFC72C	#DA291C	#FFFFFF
RGB	255, 199, 44	218, 41, 28	255, 255, 255
CMYK	0.19.89.0	0.95.100.0	0.0.0.0

== 20th century ==
Ulster Banner

In the 20th century, during the partition of Ireland, the flag of Ulster was used as the basis for creating the Ulster Banner to be used as the flag of Northern Ireland. The background was changed to white with the shield behind the hand being replaced to a six pointed star to symbolise the six counties of Ulster that made up Northern Ireland with a crown on top to symbolise loyalty to the United Kingdom. This Ulster Banner is sometimes known as the "6 counties flag", whereas the provincial flag of Ulster is occasionally referred to as the "9 counties flag". The Ulster Banner is also referred to as the flag of Ulster. In 2018, it was revealed following a Freedom of Information request that Police Scotland listed that flying the flag of Ulster provocatively in Scotland could be considered an offence under the Criminal Justice and Licensing (Scotland) Act 2010 punishable by up to 5 years imprisonment.

== Sports use ==
The flag of Ulster is used in sports. In rugby union, the Ireland national rugby union team which represents both Northern Ireland and the Republic of Ireland fly the flag of Ulster alongside the Irish tricolour at their home matches. However officially, the Irish Rugby Football Union use their own neutral flag which contains symbols of the four provinces of Ireland including Ulster. During the Rugby World Cup, both flags lead the team out. Ulster Rugby which represents the province, use the flag of Ulster, as do some fans, whilst some use the Ulster Banner. In association football, fans of Cliftonville and Celtic can be seen with the flag of Ulster during their matches. The Ulster GAA also use the flag during provincial Gaelic games matches. It also features in the Four Provinces Flag used by a number of other sporting organisations that operate on an all-Ireland basis.

== Forms and uses ==
The flag of Ulster is usually displayed alongside the flags of Leinster, Munster, and Connacht, or as part of the combined flag of the Provinces of Ireland. The flag is the official flag of the Ulster Gaelic Athletic Association and the Ulster rugby team, and is part of the IRFU four provinces flag and the Ireland hockey team flag.

Four Provinces Flag of Ireland

Flag of the Irish Rugby Football Union

Flag of Hockey Ireland

House flag of Irish Shipping (1947–1984)

== See also ==
- Coat of arms of Ulster
