= The Bard of Armagh =

Irish ballad

Song
- Genre: Irish
- Songwriter(s): Patrick Donnelly

"The Bard of Armagh" is an Irish ballad. It is often attributed to Patrick Donnelly. He was made Bishop of Dromore in 1697, the same year as the enactment of the 1697 Banishment Act which was intended to clear out all Roman Catholic clergy from Ireland. Donnelly is believed to have taken the pseudonym and disguise of the travelling harper Phelim Brady. Patrick Donnelly was born in Desertcreat in Tyrone, and a slab in the graveyard there, almost worn away, is inscribed with a mitre and sceptre and what appears to be the name 'Phelim Brady'. The Irish language version of the song appears to have been lost.

The song in English, like many heroic, rebel outlaw ballads, dates from the mid 19th century, when it was printed as a broadside ballad in Dublin. The same melody is used in the songs Príosún Chluain Meala - (The Jail of Clonmel), The Sailor Cut Down in his Prime and The Streets of Laredo. Vince Gill recorded a version of three verses of this song followed by three verses of The Streets of Laredo on the album Long Journey Home, a compilation of songs about Irish emigration and the links between Irish and American folk and country music featuring various Irish and British-Irish artists, in 1998.

== Lyrics ==
Oh list to the lay of a poor Irish harper,
And scorn not the strings in his old withered hands,
But remember those fingers, they once could move sharper,
To raise up the strains of his dear native land.

When I was a young lad, King Jamie did flourish
And I followed the wars in my brogues bound with straw
And all the fair colleens from Wexford to Durrish
Called me bold Phelim Brady, the Bard of Armagh.

It was long before the shamrock, the dear isle's loved emblem,
Was crushed in its beauty by the Saxon lion's paw,
I was called by the colleens around me assembling
Their bold Phelim Brady, the Bard of Armagh.

How I love to muse on the days of my boyhood,
Though four score and three years have flitted since then.
Still it gives sweet reflection, as every first joy should,
For free-hearted boys make the best of old men.

At the fair or the wake I could twirl my shillelagh,
Or trip through a jig with my brogues bound with straw.
Faith, all the pretty girls in the village and the valley
Loved bold Phelim Brady, the Bard of Armagh.

Now though I have wandered this wide world over,
Still Ireland's my home and a parent to me.
Then O, let the turf that my bosom shall cover
Be cut from the ground that is trod by the free.

And when in his cold arms Death shall embrace me,
Och! lull me asleep with sweet 'Erin-go-Bragh',
By the side of my Kathleen, my first love, then place me,
Then forget Phelim Brady, the Bard of Armagh.
