= Eoghan Ó Donnghaile =

Irish poet

Eoghan Ó Donnghaile (Owen O'Donnelly) (fl. c. 1690) was an Irish poet.

Eugene O'Curry wrote of Ó Donnghaile in his Manners and Customs , saying that:

"About 1680 a controversy sprang up among some of the bards of Ulster as to what race by ancient right belonged the armorial bearing of Ulster – the Red Hand – belonged. Eoghan Ó Donnghaile took part in the controversy and claimed the Red Hand for the O'Neills of Tyrone."

Robin Flower believed that Ó Donnghaile was a member of the bardic family that had fostered Séan 'an díomais' Ó Néill (Shane O'Neill), and there is a lament for Shane – Ceist ar eolchibh iath Éireann/A question for the learned of Ireland ... – attributed to Ó Donnghaile. Shane's fosterage among the Ó Donnghailes of Ballydonnelly, County Tyrone, led to him being known as Shane Ó Donnghaileach.

Seosamh Ó Dufaigh held that he may be identical with the Eoghan Ó Donnghaile listed in the 1704 registration of clergy for the parish of Armagh, a priest and the author of Comhairle Mhic Clámha, and Mo choin do theacht Fheidhlime ... Ó Dufaigh sees the latter as salutation to his kinsman, Pádraig Ó Donnghaile, also known as Feilim Brady, The Bard of Armagh.

Ó Donnghaile is the author of:

- Ceist ar eolchibh iath Éireann/A question for the learned of Ireland ...
- Trom na gartha sa a Leith Chuinn/Sad these shouts, oh Leith Chuinn ..., a lament.
- Tuirseach damh aig eirghe lae/Woeful to me the rising of the day ...
- Is nar an sgelsa teachd da thigh/Bad is the new that came to your house ..., a reply to Dermod mac Lewis Mac an Bhaird.

Ó Donnghaile is ascribed as author of:

- Mo choin do theacht Fheidhlime/Welome to you Feilimidh ...
- Comhairle Mhic Clámha/MacClave's Advice
