= Stepan Center =

Geodesic dome at the University of Notre Dame

Coordinates: 41.7067°N 86.2344°W

An aerial view of Stepan Center in October 1963.

Stepan Center is a multi-purpose geodesic dome built in 1962 at the University of Notre Dame, and is located on the northeast corner of campus. The $350,000 to build Stepan Center was donated to the university by Alfred Stepan, the founder of Stepan Company, and his wife, Mary Louise. The architect firm credited for the design is Ellerbe Associates, a Minneapolis, Minnesota based architectural firm, who handled a substantial amount of Notre Dame projects in that period.

The dome consists of 600 sections of aluminum, and weighs 127 tons. The facility, which was one of the first geodesic domes built in the United States, has 21,000 square feet (2,000 m^{2}) of floor space, and a seating capacity of 2,000. The center attracted widespread attention at its opening, according to a 2022 Notre Dame Magazine article. Time Magazine described the structure as resembling "a giant, gilded armadillo shell".

== Notable events and speakers ==
On October 18, 1963 Martin Luther King Jr. spoke at Stepan Center, in an event organized by the South Bend Citizens’ Civic Planning Committee as a fundraiser for the Southern Christian Leadership Conference. King spoke about the problems of segregation, discrimination, and the civil right movement. The event, arranged by Theodore Hesburgh, was at the venue's s capacity and attracted a racially mixed crowd estimated at 3,000 to 3,500 people. In 1968, Robert F. Kennedy gave a speech there during the 1968 presidential campaign.

Other notable speakers who have appeared at the center include: William F. Buckley, Ted Kennedy, Bill Clinton, Betty Shabazz, George H. W. Bush, Norman Mailer, Dick Gregory, Oliver Stone, George McGovern, Ralph Nader, Leonard Nimoy, John McCain and Jimmy Carter.

Stepan Center has also featured many notable musical performances, including: Peter, Paul and Mary, The Kingston Trio, The Supremes, Ray Charles, The Lovin' Spoonful, The Box Tops, The Eagles, Neil Diamond, Herbie Hancock, Pure Prairie League, Indigo Girls, The Smithereens, Del Water Gap, and the Goo Goo Dolls.

As of spring 2022, Stepan Center was still being heavily used for Notre Dame student events and the university has invested in repairs to its roof, installed new windows and made other improvements to assure its continued use.

== See also ==
- Geodesic airframe
- Geodesic grid
- Geodesic tents
