= Red Hand of Ulster =

Symbol used in heraldry to denote the Irish province of Ulster

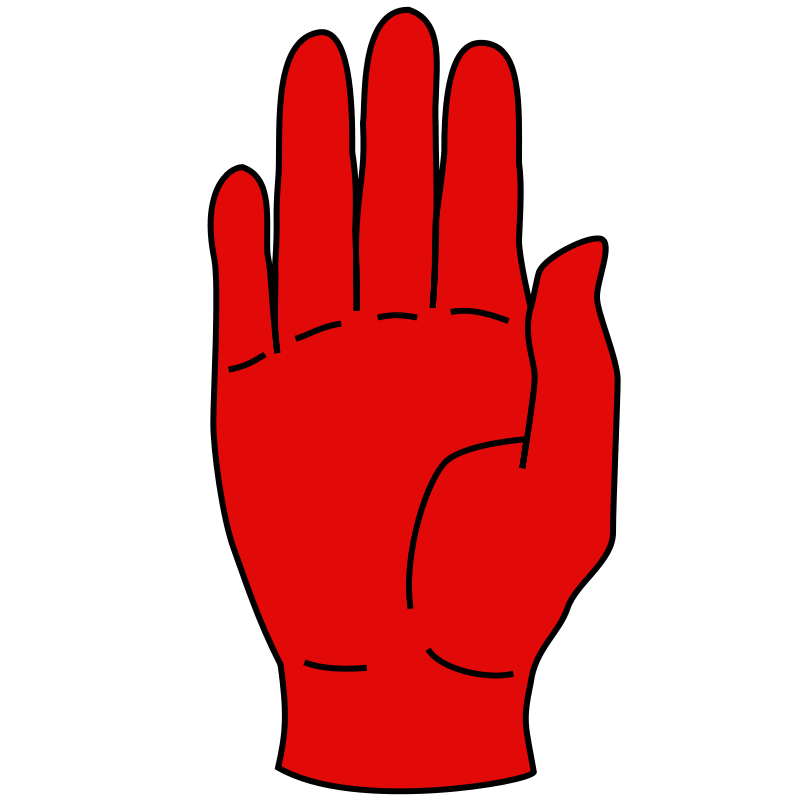
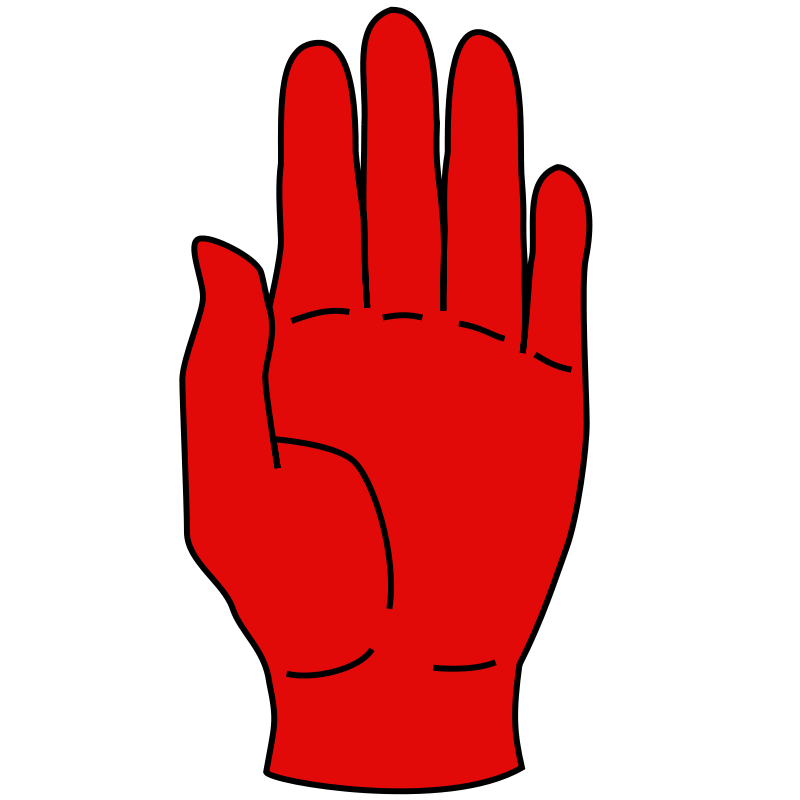
The Red Hand of Ulster, dexter and sinister versions

The Red Hand of Ulster (Irish: Lámh Dhearg Uladh) is a symbol used in heraldry to denote the Irish province of Ulster and the Northern Uí Néill in particular. It has also been used however by other Irish clans across the island, including the ruling families of western Connacht (i.e., the O'Flahertys and MacHughs) and the chiefs of the Midlands (e.g., O'Daly, O'Kearney, etc.).

It is an open hand coloured red, with the fingers pointing upwards, the thumb held parallel to the fingers, and the palm facing forward. It is usually shown as a right hand, but is sometimes a left hand, such as in the coats of arms of baronets.

== Historical background ==
Original red hand seal of Ó Néill

The Red Hand is rooted in Gaelic culture as the sign of a great warrior. It is believed to date back to pagan times.

A 12th century tale from the Ulster Cycle of mythology, Cath Ruis na Ríg ("the Battle of Rossnaree"), which is preserved in The Book of Leinster, describes a defeat inflicted on the Laigin (Leinster) by the Ulaid (Ulster) on the banks of the Boyne. On this occasion the Laigin where allied to the Connachta (Connacht), the traditional enemies of the Ulaid. But in this tale it is Leinster which is described as coicid lámdeirg Lagen ("the red-handed province of Leinster").

The Red Hand is first documented in surviving records in the 13th century, where it was used by the Hiberno-Norman de Burgh earls of Ulster. It was Walter de Burgh who became first Earl of Ulster in 1243 who combined the de Burgh cross with the Red Hand to create a flag that represented the Earldom of Ulster and later became the modern Flag of Ulster.

It was afterwards adopted by the O'Neills when they assumed the ancient kingship of Ulster, inventing the title Rex Ultonie (king of Ulster) for themselves in 1317 and then claiming it unopposed from 1345 onwards. An early Irish heraldic use in Ireland of the open right hand can be seen in the seal of Aodh Reamhar Ó Néill, king of the Irish of Ulster, 1344–1364.

An early-15th-century poem by Mael Ó hÚigínn is named Lámh dhearg Éireann í Eachach, the first line of which is a variation of the title: "Lamh dhearg Éiriond Ibh Eathoch", translated as "The Úí Eachach are the 'red hand' of Ireland". The Uí Eachach were one of the Cruthin tribes (known as the Dál nAraidi after 773) that made up the ancient kingdom of Ulaid.

The Red Hand symbol is believed to have been used by the O'Neills during its Nine Years' War (1594–1603) against English rule in Ireland, and the war cry lámh dearg Éireann abú! ("the Red Hand of Ireland to victory") was also associated with them. An English writer of the time noted "The Ancient Red Hand of Ulster, the bloody Red Hand, a terrible cognizance! And in allusion to that terrible cognizance—the battle cry of Lamh dearg abu!"

The Order of Baronets was instituted by letters patent dated 10 May 1612, which state that "the Baronets and their descendants shall and may bear, either in a canton in their coat of arms, or in an inescutcheon, at their election, the arms of Ulster, that is, in a field argent, a hand gules, or a bloody hand." The oldest baronets used a dexter (right) hand just like the O'Neills; however, it later became a sinister (left) hand.

=== Clan dispute over ownership ===
The exclusive rights to the use of the Red Hand symbol have proven a matter of debate over the centuries, primarily whether it belonged to the O'Neills or the Magennises. The O'Neills became the chief dynasty of the Cenél nEógain of the Northern Uí Néill and later the kings of Ulster, whilst the Magennises were the ruling dynasty of the Uí Eachach Cobo, the chief dynasty of the Cruthin of Ulaid, and also head of the Clanna Rudraige. A 16th-century poem noted disagreement between the "Síol Rúraí" (an alias for Clanna Rudraige) and the Northern Uí Néill.

A dispute, dated to 1689, arose between several Irish poets about whose claim to the Red Hand was the most legitimate.

- Diarmaid Mac an Bhaird, one of the last fully trained Irish bardic poets, admonishes the claim of the O'Neills to the Red Hand, arguing that it rightly belongs to the Magennises, who should be allowed to keep it. He supports his statement citing several medieval texts attributing it to Conall Cernach, the legendary ancestor of the Uí Eachach Cobo.
- Eoghan Ó Donnghaile refutes the Clanna Róigh (Clanna Rudraige) right to the symbol. He cites a story based on the Lebor Gabála Érenn claiming that it belongs to the descendants of Érimón, from whom Conn of the Hundred Battles and thus the O'Neills are said to descend.
- Niall Mac Muireadhaigh dismisses both these claims and states that the symbol belongs to the Clann Domhnaill (Clandonnell, descended from the Three Collas, the legendary ancestors of the Airgíalla). Mac Muireadhaigh derides Ó Donnghaile as a fool and finds it deplorable that he is an author.

Further poetic quatrains in the dispute were written by Mac an Baird, Ó Donnghaile, as well as by Mac an Bhaird's son Eoghain. The Mac an Bhairds appear to deride Ó Donnghaile as not having come from a hereditary bardic family and that he is of very low rank without honour, as well as hinting at his family's genealogical link to the O'Neills.

Writing in 1908, the then head of the O'Neill clan says of the Red Hand: "History teaches us that already in pagan days it was adopted by the O'Neills from the Macgennis, who were princes in the north of Ireland region inhabited by them".

=== Possible origins ===
Those involved in the bardic dispute of 1689 claimed that the Red Hand symbol came from a legendary ancestor who put his bloodstained hand on a banner after victory in battle:

- Diarmaid Mac an Bhaird claimed that Conall Cernach (a mythical Ulaid hero from the Ulster Cycle) put his bloodied hand on a banner as he avenged the death of Cú Chulainn (another mythical Ulaid hero), and it has belonged to the descendants of Conall since then. This he says is backed up by medieval texts such as the Scéla Mucce Meic Da Thó ("The Tale of Mac Da Thó's Pig"), the Leabhar Ultach (also known as the Senchas Ulad and Senchas Síl Ír), and Ó hÚigínn's poem beginning Lámh Éireann í Eachach.
- Eoghan Ó Donnghaile, basing his tale on the Lebor Gabála Érenn, claimed that after the Milesians defeated the Tuatha Dé Danann, they are granted three precious objects, amongst them a banner bearing the red hand. This banner eventually ended up without contest in the hands of the descendants of Míl's son Érimón, from whom Conn of the Hundred Battles and thus the O'Neills are said to descend. The surviving texts of the Lebor Gabála Érenn mention four treasures but not a banner.
- Niall Mac Muireadhaigh claimed that when the Three Collas defeated the Ulaid, that one of the Collas placed their bloodied hand on a banner taken from them. He then states the Clann Domhnaill have used the symbol within his own time, and accepts the poem Lámh Éireann í Eachach. However, according to historian Gordon Ó Riain, Mac Muireadhaigh has mistaken the í Eachach element to mean the descendants of Echu Doimlén, father of the Collas, when in fact it is in reference to Echu Coba, legendary ancestor of the Magennises.

F.J. Bigger in a paper read before the Royal Irish Academy in April 1900 noted the use of a right hand by the O'Neills around 1335, and surmises that it may have been for them a symbol signifying divine assistance and strength, whilst also suggesting that the ancient Phoenicians may have brought the symbol to Ireland.

In medieval Irish literature, several real and legendary kings were given the byname 'red hand' or 'red handed' to signify that they were great warriors. One is the mythical High King of Ireland, Lugaid Lámderg (Lugaid the red handed), who, according to Eugene O'Curry, is cited in one Irish legend as being king of the Cruthin of Ulaid during the reign of the mythical Conchobar Mac Nessa. The O'Neills believed in the Middle Ages that a messianic 'red handed' king called Aodh Eangach would come to lead them and drive the English out of Ireland. In a 1901 edition of the All Ireland Review, a writer called "M.M." suggests that the Red Hand is named after the founder of the Clanna Rudraige, Rudraige mac Sithrigi, and that Rudraige's name may mean "red wrist". In another edition a "Y.M." suggests likewise, arguing that Rudraige's name means "red arm". They also suggest that the Cróeb Ruad (Red Branch) of ancient Ulaid may actually come from crob and ruadh (red hand).

In another legend which has become widespread, the first man to lay his hand on the province of Ulster would have claim to it. As a result, the warriors rushed towards land with one chopping off his hand and throwing it over his comrades and thus winning the land. In some versions of the tale, the person who cuts off his hand belongs to the O'Neills, or is Niall of the Nine Hostages himself. In other versions, the person is the mythical Érimón.

=== "Red Hand" as a byname ===
In medieval Irish literature, several real and legendary kings were given the byname "red hand" or "red-handed" (lámhdhearg or crobhdhearg). It signified that they were great warriors, their hands being red with the blood of their enemies.

- The ancient Irish god Nuada Airgetlám (Nuada the silver-handed) was also known by the alias Nuada Derg Lamh, the red-handed, amongst other aliases. Nuada is stated in the Book of Lecan as being the ancestor of the Eoganachta and Dál gCais of Munster.
- Lugaid Lámderg is a legendary figure who appears in the Book of Leinster and the "chaotic past" of the descent of the Dál gCais. His epithet meaning "red hand", was transferred to Lugaid Meann around the start of the Irish historic period.
- Labraid Lámderg (red hand Labraid) is a character in the Fenian Cycle of Irish mythology, who is the friend of the warrior hero Oscar.
- The Annals of the Four Masters mentions "Reachta Righdhearg" (Rechtaid Rígderg) as a High King of Ireland. He gained the name "Righdhearg" according to Geoffrey Keating as he had an arm that was "exceeding Red". Reachta is listed as the great-grandson of "Lughaigdh Lamdhearg" (Lugaid Lámderg).
- Cathal Crobhdearg Ua Conchobair, otherwise known as "Cathal the Red-Handed O'Conor", was a king of Connacht in the early 13th century. There is a poem that is attributed as having been composed between 1213 and Cathal's death in 1224, which makes frequent reference to Cathal's red hand.
- A Dermott Lamhdearg is cited by Meredith Hanmer in his "Chronicles of Ireland" (first published in 1633), as being a king of Leinster who fought a battle around the start of the 5th century against an army of marauders at Knocknigen near Dublin.
- The Kavanaghs of Borris, County Carlow, descend from Dermot Kavanagh Lamhdearg, lord of St Mullin's, the second son of Gerald Kavanagh, Lord of Ferns in 1431. Gerald was descended from Domhnall Caomhánach, a son of Diarmait Mac Murchada, king of Leinster.
- The Cavenaghs of Kildare that became part of the Protestant Ascendancy are kin of the Kavanagh's of Borris and according to their own traditions claim descent from a Cathair Rua Caomhánach who was said to descend the Lámhdhearg (Red Hand) branch of the Caomhánach clan.
- Quatran 78 of the classical Irish poem Carn Fraoich Soitheach na Saorchlann, makes mention of the "inghean ríogh lámhdhearg Laighean", translated as 'a descendant (lit. 'daughter') of the red-handed kings of Leinster'. This poem, as well as the related poem Osnach Carad i gCluain Fraoch, mention a Carn Lámha, the burial place of Fraoch's hand.
- Gleoir Lamhderg, or Gleoir the red-handed, was a king of the Lamraighe and allegedly the step-father of Fionn mac Cumhaill from the Fenian Cycle of Irish mythology. The Lamraighe are claimed as descending from Lamha, a son of Conchobar mac Nessa, a legendary king of Ulster.

== Similar symbols ==
The Dextera Dei, or "Right Hand of God", is a symbol that appears on only three high crosses in Ireland: the Cross of Muiredach at Monasterboice; the Cross of King Flann (also known as the Cross of the Scriptures) at Clonmacnoise; and the Cross in the Street of Kells. The former two have the full hand with fingers extended similar to the Red Hand. The form and position of the Kells Dextera Dei is of a pattern usually found on the Continent, whereas that used at Monasterboice and Clonmacnoise appears to unique within Christendom.

Bigger suggested the mention of the Dextera Dei in Psalm 118 and Acts 2 represented the old-world figurative expression signifying strength and power, and such hand symbols can be found in ancient civilisations including amongst others the Assyrians, Babylonians, Carthaginians, Chaldeans and Phoenicians. It is also used by Jews, Muslims, and can be found in use in Palestine and Morocco. Aboriginal Australians revered the hands of their deceased chieftains. In the published version of his paper Bigger mentions a book published after he'd read his paper, Horns of Plenty by F. T. Elworthy (though F.J. appears instead of F.T.), writing that it conclusively proved the ancient character and widespread usage of the symbol amongst early pagan civilisations.

According to Charles Vallancey in 1788, a red hand pointing upwards was the armorial symbol of the kings of Ireland, and that it was still in use by the O'Brien family, whose motto was Lamh laidir an uachdar, meaning "the strong hand up" or "the strong hand will prevail". Hands feature prominently in Dermot O'Connor's 18th-century publication "Blazons and Irish Heraldic Terminology", with the Ó Fearghail sept bearing the motto Lámh dhearg air chlogad lúptha.

=== References to Galicia ===
In some Central European armorials of the 15th, 16th and 17th centuries, the Kingdom of Galicia is represented by a coat of arms with a red hand or a red glove. It may be due to the phonetic similarity between Gaelic and Galician ('canting arms' used to do this deliberately or by confusion, such as Galice-Calice or D'Aragón-Dragón), or by the assimilation of the Galician people with the Milesians (people of Breogán). The most common heraldic shield in Galicia, as an autonomous region or as a kingdom, is a grail with crosses or shamrocks from the 13th century to the present day. In the 17th century St. James of Compostella (Santiago de Compostela) became, according to the bishop Thomas Strong (uncle of Thomas White, founder of the Irish College of Compostela after the Flight of the Earls) the "true capital of the Irish people in exile".

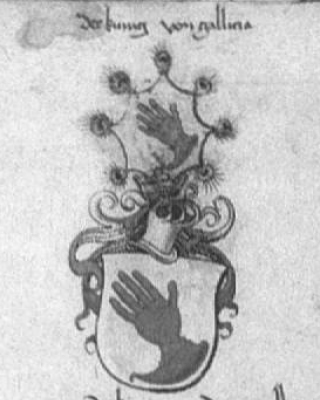
Coat of arms of Kingdom of Galicia in Miltenberg armorial, c. 1486–1500.

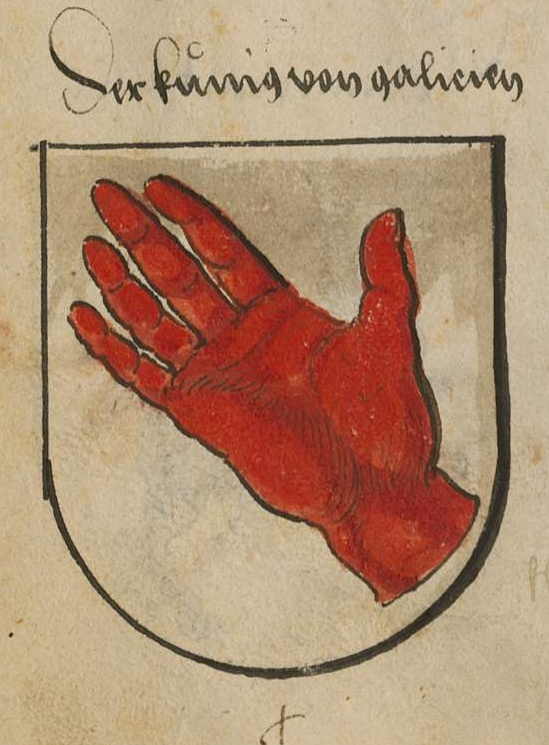
Coat of arms of Galicia in Sammelband mehrerer Wappenbücher, c. 1530.

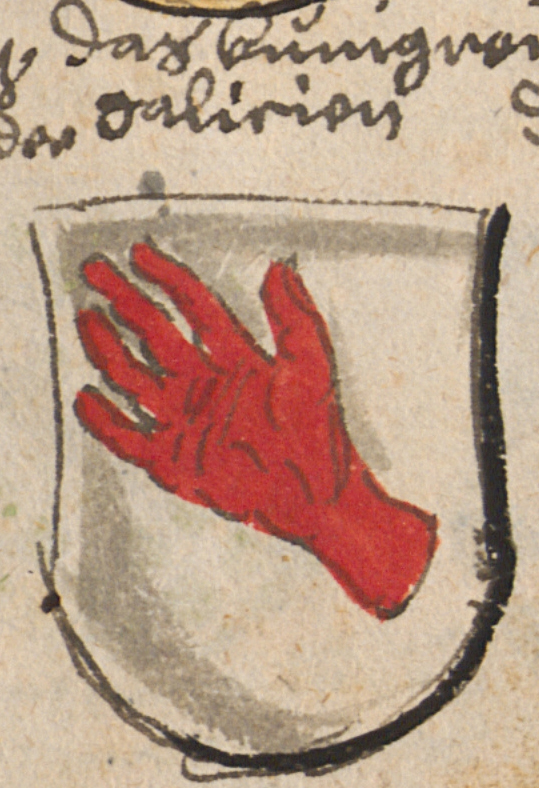
Coat of arms of Galicia in Hofkleiderbuch, 1508–1551.

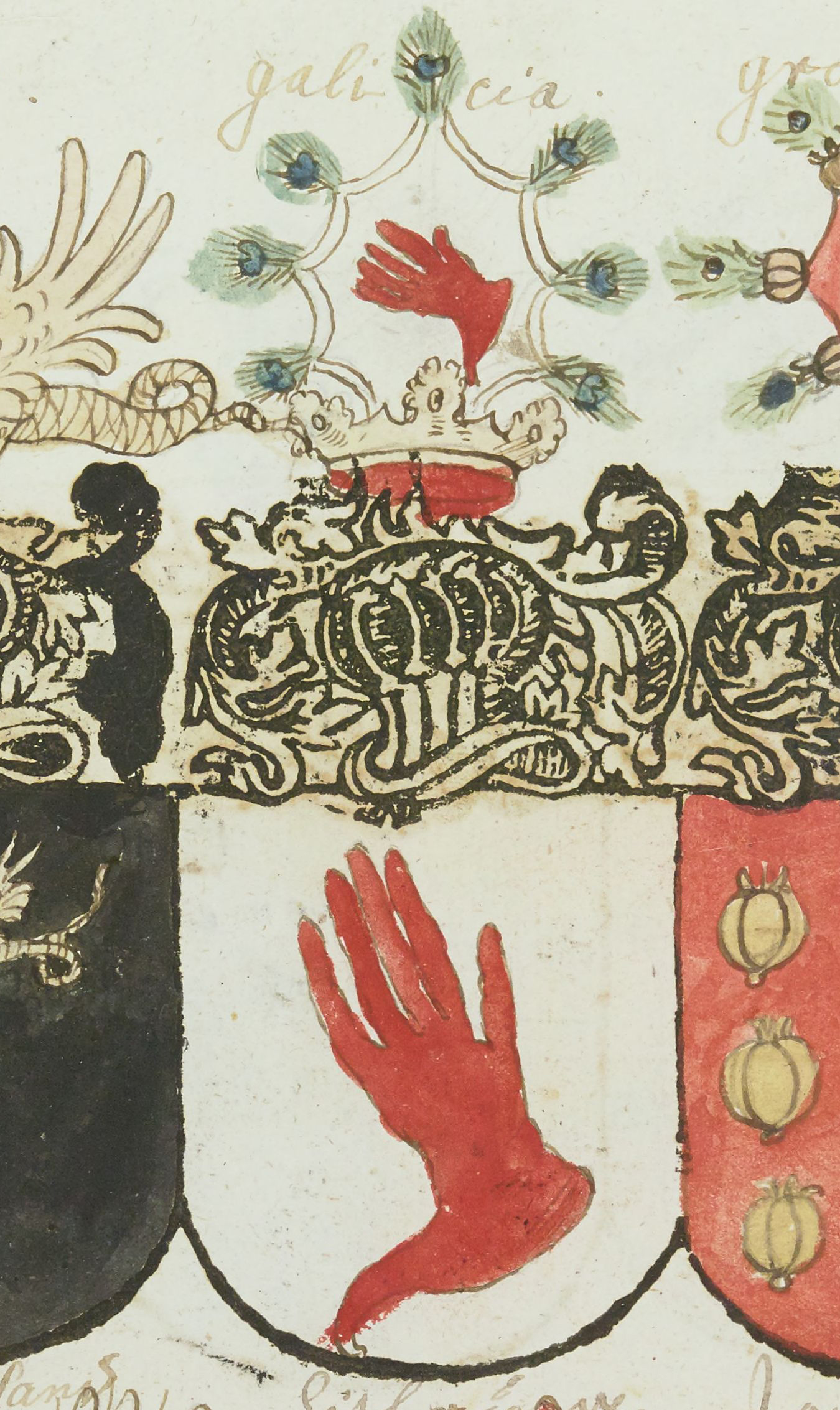
Coat of arms of Galicia in another German armorial, 17th century

== Modern usage ==
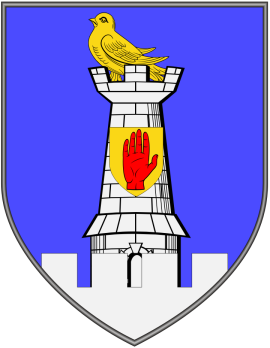
Coat of arms of Monaghan

In modern times the Red Hand sees use by both Irish nationalists and Ulster loyalists, although is more closely associated with the latter, whose murals often centre the symbol as a focal point. However it is still one of the few cross-community symbols. The Red Hand is present in the coat of arms of four of the nine counties composing Ulster, namely Antrim, Londonderry, Fermanagh and Tyrone. It also appears in the Ulster Banner, the official flag of Northern Ireland until 1973. and is used by many other official and non-official organisations throughout the province.

The Red Hand features in other Irish clan coats of arms including the O'Donnellys, O'Cahans, the McHughs of County Galway and their fellow Connacht kinsmen the Flahertys, Dalys, Melaghlins and Kearneys. On the O'Neill and Donnelly coat of arms the motto is Lámh Dhearg Éireann (Red Hand of Ireland). The arms of the chiefs of the Scottish Clan MacNeil (of Barra) contain the Red Hand; the clan has traditionally claimed descent from Niall of the Nine Hostages. Many other families have used the Red Hand to highlight an Ulster ancestry. The head of the Guinness family, the Earl of Iveagh, has three Red Hands on his arms granted as recently as 1891.

The arms of the Irish Society that carried out the Plantation of Ulster feature the Red Hand.

=== Baronets ===
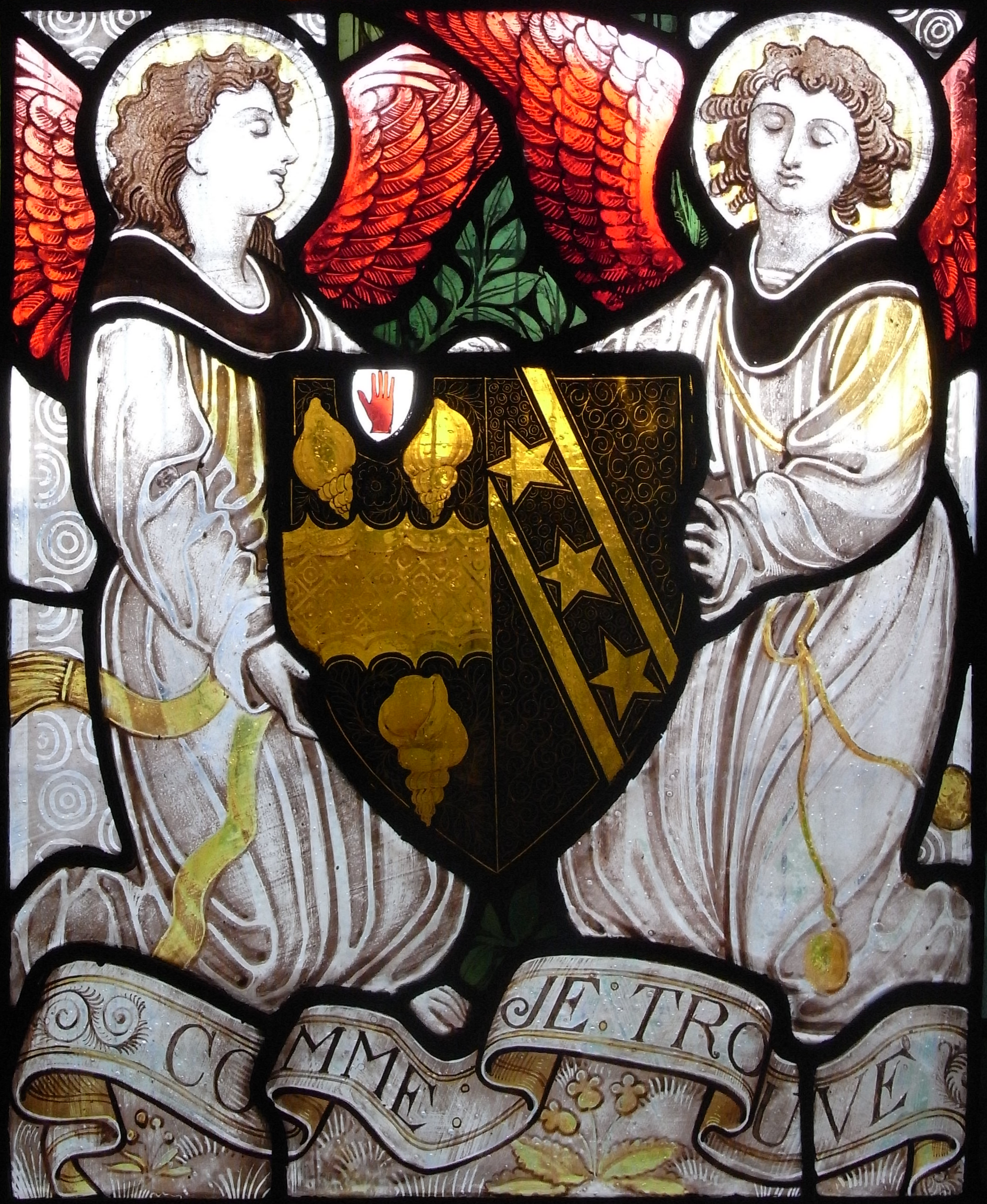
Arms of the Shelley baronets, including a Red Hand of Ulster

A left (sinister) Red Hand is an option for baronets to add to their arms to indicate their rank. The College of Arms formally allowed this in 1835, ruling that the baronets of England, Ireland, Great Britain or the United Kingdom may "bear either a canton in their coat of arms, or in an escutcheon, at their pleasure, the arms of Ulster (to wit) a Hand Gules or a Bloody Hand in a Field Argent." It is blazoned as follows: A hand sinister couped at the wrist extended in pale gules.

King James I of England established the hereditary Order of Baronets in England on 22 May 1611, in the words of Collins (1741): "for the plantation and protection of the whole Kingdom of Ireland, but more especially for the defence and security of the Province of Ulster, and therefore for their distinction those of this order and their descendants may bear (the Red Hand of Ulster) in their coats of arms either in a canton or an escutcheon at their election". Such baronets may also display the Red Hand of Ulster on its own as a badge, suspended by a ribbon below the shield of arms. Baronets of Nova Scotia, unlike other baronets, do not use the Red Hand of Ulster, but have their own badge showing the Royal Arms of Scotland on a shield over the Saltire of St Andrew. The left-hand version has also been used by the Irish National Foresters, the Irish Citizen Army, and the Federated Workers' Union of Ireland.

=== Examples ===
The flag of the province of Ulster

Four Provinces Flag of Ireland

Flag of Northern Ireland (1953–1972)

Ensign of the Royal Ulster Yacht Club

House flag of the Larne and Stranraer Steamboat Company

House flag of the Ulster Steamship Company

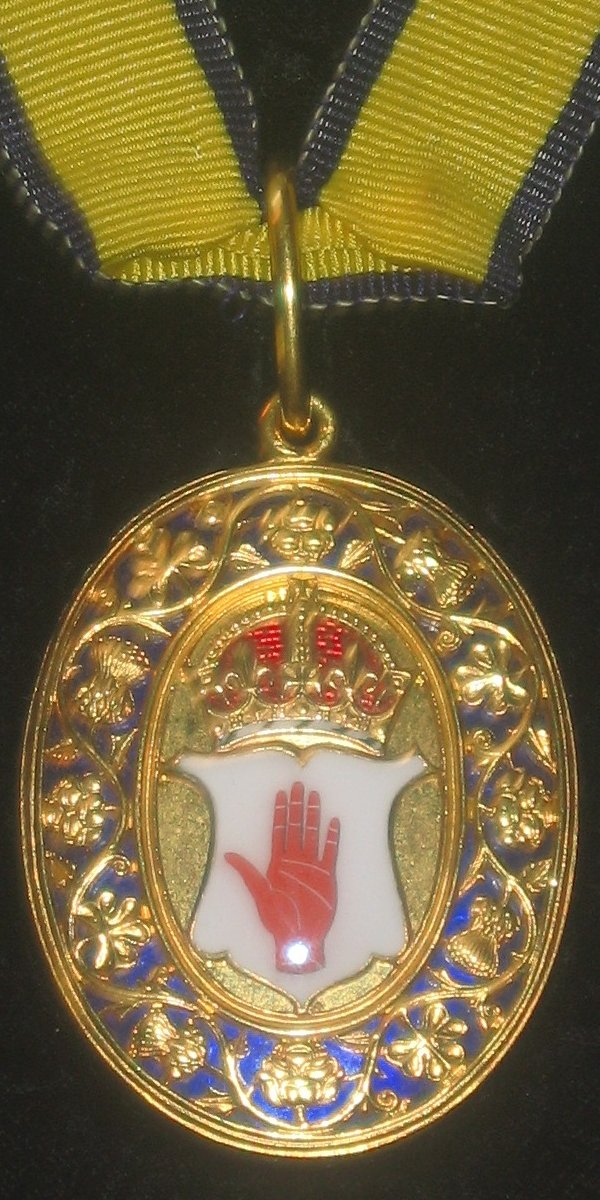
Badge worn by baronets of the United Kingdom

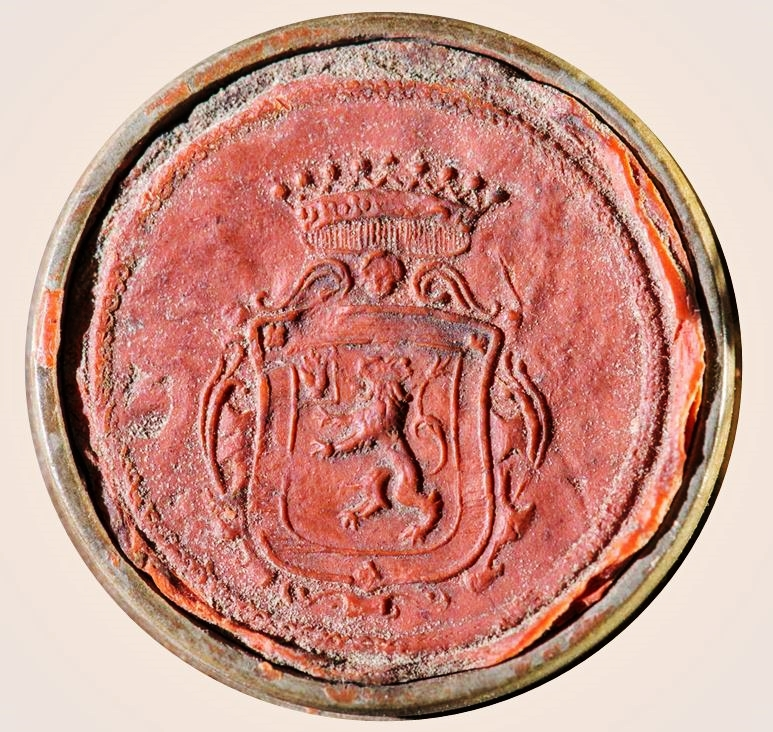
Seal with left hand for the Curtius baronets

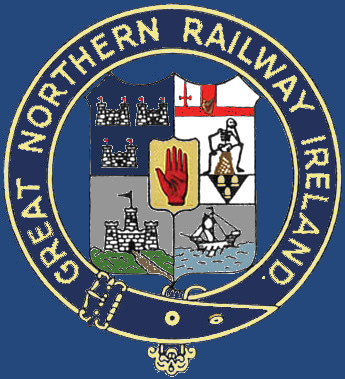
The coat of arms of the GNR.

Republican National Graves Association, Belfast

Arms of O'Neill Hall at the University of Notre Dame

Arms of Magennis of Iveagh

Arms of McCartan, a branch of the Magennis

== Bibliography ==
- Barry, E. (1895). "On Ogham-Stones Seen in Kilkenny County". The Journal of the Royal Society of Antiquaries of Ireland. Fifth Series. 5 (4). Royal Society of Antiquaries of Ireland: 348–368.
- Bergin, Osborn (1925). "Unpublished Irish Poems. XXIX: On Cathal Redhand". Studies: An Irish Quarterly Review. 14 (53). Irish Province of the Society of Jesus: 61–65.
- Bigger, Francis Joseph (1900). "The Dextera Dei Sculptured on the High Crosses of Ireland". Proceedings of the Royal Irish Academy. Third Series (6). Royal Irish Academy – via Internet Archive. Read before the Royal Irish Academy 9 April 1900. Published October 1900 with extra paragraph.
- Burke, Bernard (1884). The General Armory of England, Scotland, Ireland, and Wales, Comprising a Registry of Armorial Bearings from the Earliest to the Present Time. Heritage Books – via Internet Archive.
- Burtchaell, G. D. (1902). "Badge of the Royal Society of Antiquaries of Ireland". The Journal of the Royal Society of Antiquaries of Ireland. Fifth Series. 32 (4). Royal Society of Antiquaries of Ireland: 415–418.
- Cavanagh, Cathal (2006). "Miscellaneous Stories of Caomhánachs in Exile". The Past (27). Uí Cinsealaigh Historical Society: 96–105. JSTOR 25520125.
- Fitzpatrick, Elizabeth (2004). Royal Inauguration in Gaelic Ireland C. 1100–1600: A Cultural Landscape Study. Boydell Press. ISBN 9781843830900.
- Duffy, Seán (2005). Medieval Ireland An Encyclopedia. Routledge. ISBN 0-415-94052-4.
- Hamilton, G. A. (1844). "On "A North House," in the Demesne of Hampton, and the Opening of a Tumulus near Knockingen". Proceedings of the Royal Irish Academy. Vol. 3. Royal Irish Academy. pp. 249–252.
- Keating, Geoffrey (1723). The General History of Ireland. J. Bettenham.
- Keating, Geoffrey (1983). Keating's History of Ireland. Irish Genealogical Foundation. ISBN 978-0-686-44360-5.
- M., M. (1901). "The "Three Waves" of Ancient Erin". All Ireland Review. 2 (24): 184–185. doi:10.2307/20545459. JSTOR 20545459.
- McManus, Damian (2013). "Surnames and Scions: Adjectival Qualification of Christian Names and Cognomina in Classical Irish Poetry". Ériu. 63, pp. 117–143. Royal Irish Academy.
- Ó Cróinín, Dáibhí (1995). Early Medieval Ireland 400–1200. Longman.
- O'Curry, Eugene (2010). On the Manners and Customs of the Ancient Irish, III. Kessinger Publishing. ISBN 978-1163577769.
- O'Daly, John; O'Donovan, John (1853). "Inauguration of Cathal Crobhdhearg O'Conor, King of Connaught". Transactions of the Kilkenny Archaeological Society. 2 (2). Royal Society of Antiquaries of Ireland: 335–347.
- O'Neill, The (1908). "The Heraldic Emblem of Ireland". Ulster Journal of Archaeology. Second Series. 14 (4). Ulster Archaeological Society: 178–180.
- Ó Riain, Gordon (2011). "VARIA III. Quatrains relating to the controversy of the Red Hand". Ériu. 61. Royal Irish Academy: 171–178. doi:10.1353/eri.2011.0006. hdl:10344/5838. S2CID 245848621.
- Ó Riain, Gordon (2013). "VARIA I". Ériu. 63. Royal Irish Academy: 145–153. doi:10.3318/ERIU.2013.63.145. hdl:10344/5837.
- Schlegel, Donald M. (2002). Reweaving the Tapestry of Ancient Ulster. Vol. Clogher Record. Clogher Historical Society. pp. 747–9.
- Shearman, J. F. (1877). "Loca Patriciana: Part XI. St. Patrick's Progress into Ossory-Disertum Patricii, Martartech in Magh Roighne – Patrician Missionaries in Ossory, Their Churches, Killamorey: St. Ciaran, First Bishop and Patron of Ossory: His Period, &c., &c.: Notices of Some Saints of the Raceof the Ossorians". The Journal of the Royal Historical and Archaeological Association of Ireland. Fourth Series. 4 (29). Royal Society of Antiquaries of Ireland: 188–245.
- Welsh, Robert (1996). Oxford Concise Companion to Irish Literature. ISBN 0-19-280080-9.
- Westropp, Thomas Johnson (1918). "The Earthworks, Traditions, and the Gods of South-Eastern Co. Limerick, Especially from Knocklong to Temair Erann". Proceedings of the Royal Irish Academy. 34. Royal Irish Academy: 127–183. JSTOR 25504213.
- Williams, N. J. A. (1990). "Dermot O'Connor's Blazons and Irish Heraldic Terminology". Eighteenth-Century Ireland / Iris an Dá Chultúr. 5. Eighteenth-Century Ireland Society: 61–88. doi:10.3828/eci.1990.7. S2CID 256187747.
- Vallancey, Charles (1788). "Description of an Ancient Monument in the Church of Lusk in the County of Dublin". The Transactions of the Royal Irish Academy. 2. Royal Irish Academy: 57–68.
- M., Y. (1901). "Annals of the Four Masters". All Ireland Review. 2 (14): 102–103. doi:10.2307/20545308. JSTOR 20545308.

== See also ==
- Saint Ultan
- National symbols of Ireland, the Republic of Ireland and Northern Ireland
