= Oladipo Ogunlesi =

Nigerian professor of medicine (1923–2023)

- Born: Theophilus Oladipo Ogunlesi; 12 July 1923; Sagamu, Southern Region, British Nigeria (now in Ogun State, Nigeria)
- Died: 19 January 2023 (aged 99)
- Burial place: Cathedral Church of St. Paul, Sagamu
- Occupations: Academic; medical doctor; professor
- Known for: First Nigerian professor of medicine
- Spouse: Susan Olorunfemi Peters
- Children: 7, including Adebayo

Academic background
- Education: Yaba Higher College; University of London; University of Minnesota

Academic work
- Institutions: University College Hospital, Ibadan; University of Ibadan
- Notable students: Isaac Folorunso Adewole, Benjamin Oluwakayode Osuntokun

Theophilus Oladipo Ogunlesi (12 July 1923 – 19 January 2023) was a Nigerian academic and medical doctor recognized as the first professor of medicine in Nigeria. Born in Sagamu, Ogun State, Ogunlesi began his education at St. Paul Primary School, Sagamu, before attending CMS Grammar School, Lagos, where he obtained his secondary school certificate in 1940. He continued his studies at Yaba Higher College, for pre-medical and medical training. He later attended the University of London and University of Minnesota where he obtained his postgraduate degrees.

Ogunlesi returned to Nigeria and joined the Western Nigeria Civil Service, serving as a medical officer from 1950 to 1956. In 1961, he became a lecturer at the University of Ibadan (UI), where he made history four years later by becoming the first Nigerian professor of medicine. He played a key role in the development of medical education in Nigeria, serving as the pioneer head of the University College Hospital (UCH) Ibadan, and the National Postgraduate Medical College of Nigeria.

During his career, Ogunlesi was a fellow of the Royal College of Physicians of London and the Royal College of Physicians of Edinburgh. He was elected as a fellow of the Association of Physicians of Nigeria and International Society for Hypertension. Ogunlesi's work was beyond research and medicine, it also involved education and mentorship. He authored many books and papers, supervised graduate students and some of them are Isaac Folorunso Adewole, Kayode Oshuntokun, and Yombo Awojobi.

== Early life and education ==
Oladipo Ogunlesi was born on 12 July 1923 to a blacksmith father in Sagamu, Ogun State. Between 1931 and 1940, he went to St. Paul's Primary School located in Sagamu. He then obtained his secondary school certificate at CMS Grammar School situated in Lagos, where his academic excellence earned him the nickname "professor" from his elementary teacher.

Between 1941 and 1942, he attended the pre-medical program at Yaba Higher College. From 1942 to 1947, he earned a Licentiate in Surgery and Medicine (LSM) with distinction in the fields of Medicine and Public Health from Yaba Medical School. In 1948, Yaba Medical School was closed, making way for the establishment of the University of Ibadan Medical School, which conferred medical degrees in affiliation with the University of London. From 1947 to 1949, holders of the LSM were no longer recognized as medical officers in Nigeria. This development prompted him to pursue additional licensing and certification in the medical field. In 1950, he passed the conjoint examinations in Edinburgh, and in 1957, he earned his first postgraduate degree in medicine from the University of London. In 1958, he successfully completed the membership examinations of the Royal College of Physicians of England and the Royal College of Physicians of Edinburgh. In 1968, he obtained his second postgraduate medical degree from the University of Minnesota in the United States of America.

== Career ==
Ogunlesi graduated from Yaba Medical School in 1947 and began his career as an assistant medical officer. This is because holders of the LSM were not recognized as medical officer. As a result, he alternated between public health facilities and community clinics for three years. In 1950, he traveled to the United Kingdom, where he passed the conjoint examinations in Edinburgh, obtaining the necessary license to qualify as a medical officer. Between 1950 and 1956, he served as a medical officer and specialist physician in the defunct Western and Northern Regions.

In 1961, he was appointed as a medical specialist at Adeoyo Hospital, which was affiliated with the teaching hospital of the newly established UI Medical School. The following year, in 1962, he was promoted to associate professor, and by 1965, he had achieved the rank of full professor. In 1969, he became the head of the department of medicine. He was the first Nigerian to serve as a lecturer and later as a professor of medicine. Throughout his academic career, he mentored prominent figures, including Isaac Folorunso Adewole, a former vice chancellor of the University of Ibadan; Kayode Oshuntokun, a founding member of the Pan African Association of Neurological Sciences; and Yombo Awojobi, a distinguished surgeon.

== Leadership roles ==
Ogunlesi held several key advisory and leadership positions in Nigeria's medical sector. From 1980 to 1983, he served as an advisor to the Nigerian government on educational medicine. He was the first president of the National Postgraduate Medical College of Nigeria, serving from 1980 to 1984. Additionally, Ogunlesi was a member of the National Implementation Committee for the health sector under Nigeria's 3rd National Development Plan from 1975 to 1979. His involvement in the UCH Ibadan included serving on its board of management from 1969 to 1972, and he represented the University of Ibadan Medical School on the Nigerian Medical Council from 1975 to 1979. In 1984, Ogunlesi became a member of the governing council of the University of Nigeria, and he acted as a special medical adviser to the Ibarapa Local Government Council between 1972 and 1975.

His impact extended beyond Nigeria. He was the former President of the Association of Physicians of Nigeria and held leadership roles within the Nigerian Medical Association, including National Vice-President and State Chairman. Furthermore, he served on the World Health Organization's Scientific Advisory Committee on Cardiovascular Diseases from 1969 to 1972.

== Awards and recognitions ==
In 1946, Oladipo Ogunlesi was awarded the Sir Walter Johnson Prize for Public Health and Medicine. The following year, he received the Blair-Atkin's Class Proficiency Prize. His achievements in the medical field were further recognized in 1983 when he was conferred with the Order of the Federal Republic (OFR). Ogunlesi's affiliations extended across both national and international academic circles. He became a member of the Royal College of Physicians of London and the Royal College of Physicians of Edinburgh in 1958. In 1962, he was elected a Fellow of the Royal College of Physicians of London, and in 1970, he became the first Nigerian to hold that distinction. His contributions to medical education in West Africa were significant, as he became a founding Fellow of the West African College of Physicians in 1978. He was also a founding Fellow of the Nigerian Academy of Science.

== Death and legacy ==
Oladipo Ogunlesi died on 19 January 2023 at the age of 99, and his funeral was held on 14 April 2023 at the Cathedral Church of Saint Paul, Sagamu. His death prompted tributes from various notable figures, including then-President Muhammadu Buhari, who acknowledged Ogunlesi's contributions to Nigerian medicine and education. Buhari noted that many of Ogunlesi's students went on to hold significant positions such as Ministers of Health, Vice-Chancellors, and specialists in various medical fields both in Nigeria and internationally.

The Governor of Ogun State, Dapo Abiodun, also expressed his condolences, highlighting Ogunlesi's pioneering role as Nigeria's first professor of medicine. He emphasized Ogunlesi's dedication to advancing medical knowledge and improving public health, which earned him widespread respect within and beyond Ogun State.

One of Ogunlesi's significant legacies was his co-founding of the Ibarapa Community and Primary Health Care Programme in 1963, in collaboration with the founding Head of Medicine at the UCH, Ibadan. This initiative, initially funded by the Rockefeller Foundation, became a model for Nigeria's primary healthcare system and was adopted by other African countries. In 1965, The Lancet praised the project as a major advancement in medical education in Africa and suggested it could serve as a model for similar initiatives in developing countries. The programme has since evolved into a collaborative effort between the University of Ibadan College of Medicine, the Oyo State Ministry of Health, the UCH, and local governments in the Ibarapa Division. By February 2016, over 203 community health rotations had been conducted for medical students from UI, each lasting six to eight weeks. Additionally, dental students from UI began participating in annual postings to Ibarapa in 2007.

== Selected publications ==
- ——— (2003). Medicine, My Passport. Spectrum Books. ISBN 978-978-029-459-5.
- ——— (1964). Ibarapa Project (in Kinyarwanda). University of Ibadan. Faculty of medicine.
- ———. "Students at Igbo-Ora: a manual on the teaching aspects of the Ibarapa project". WorldCat.org.
- ——— (1962). "Schistosomiasis and cor-pulmonale in West Africa". Transactions of the Royal Society of Tropical Medicine and Hygiene. 56 (4). Oxford University Press (OUP): 302–304. doi:10.1016/0035-9203(62)90052-4. ISSN 0035-9203. PMID 14481325.
- ——— (29 June 1968). "Hepatic failure in the tropics". BMJ. 2 (5608): 809–812. doi:10.1136/bmj.2.5608.809. ISSN 0959-8138. PMC 1991606. PMID 5656302.
- ——— (1 September 1962). "Gaucher's Disease in a Nigerian infant". Journal of Tropical Pediatrics. 8 (2). Oxford University Press (OUP): 45–47. doi:10.1093/oxfordjournals.tropej.a057625. ISSN 0142-6338.
- ——— (1962). "Idiopathic thrombocytopaenic purpura in Nigerians, with special reference to onyalai". East African Medical Journal. 39. East Afr Med J: 227–231. ISSN 0012-835X. PMID 14481323.
