= Tobey Maguire filmography =

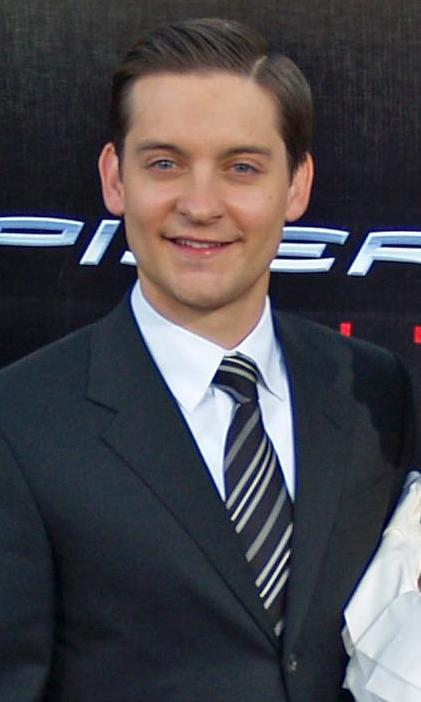
Tobey Maguire in 2007

Tobey Maguire is an American actor and producer. He gained international prominence for his role as Peter Parker / Spider-Man in the Spider-Man trilogy, which was directed by Sam Raimi, as well as the Marvel Cinematic Universe film Spider-Man: No Way Home. In 2003, he was nominated for a Saturn Award for Best Actor for his role in Spider-Man, but had lost to Robin Williams for One Hour Photo, and in 2005, he won the award for his role in Spider-Man 2. He is also known for acting in Babylon, Brothers, The Great Gatsby, Seabiscuit, and The Cider House Rules. He has also done voice overs in Cats & Dogs and The Boss Baby.

== Films ==
Year	Title	Role	Notes	Ref.
1989	The Wizard	Lucas' Goon at Video Armageddon	Uncredited	
1993	This Boy's Life	Chuck Bolger		
1994	Revenge of the Red Baron	Jimmy Spencer		
1994	S.F.W.	Al		
1994	Healer	Teenager		
1997	The Ice Storm	Paul Hood		
1997	Deconstructing Harry	Harvey Stern		
1997	Joyride	J.T.		
1998	Fear and Loathing in Las Vegas	The Hitchhiker		
1998	Pleasantville	David / Bud Parker		
1999	The Cider House Rules	Homer Wells		
1999	Ride with the Devil	Jake Roedel		
2000	Wonder Boys	James Leer		
2001	Don's Plum	Ian		
2001	Cats & Dogs	Louis "Lou" Brody	Voice	
2002	Spider-Man	Peter Parker / Spider-Man		
2003	Seabiscuit	John "Red" Pollard	Also executive producer	
2004	Spider-Man 2	Peter Parker / Spider-Man		
2006	The Good German	Corporal Patrick Tully		
2007	Spider-Man 3	Peter Parker / Spider-Man		
2008	Tropic Thunder	Himself	Guest appearance	
2009	Brothers	Captain Sam Cahill		
2011	The Details	Jeff Lang		
2013	The Great Gatsby	Nick Carraway		
2013	Labor Day	Adult Henry Wheeler		
2014	Pawn Sacrifice	Bobby Fischer		
2017	The Boss Baby	Adult Tim Templeton / Narrator	Voice	
2021	Spider-Man: No Way Home	Peter Parker / Spider-Man		
2022	Babylon	James McKay	Also executive producer	
2023	Spider-Man: Across the Spider-Verse	Peter Parker / Spider-Man	Cameo; Archive footage	

As producer

- 25th Hour (2002)
- Whatever We Do (2003)
- Country Strong (2010)
- Seeking Justice (2011)
- Rock of Ages (2012)
- Good People (2014)
- Pawn Sacrifice (2014)
- Z for Zachariah (2015)
- The 5th Wave (2016)
- Brittany Runs a Marathon (2019)
- Get Duked! (2019)
- The Best of Enemies (2019)
- The Violent Heart (2020)

As executive producer

- Nobody (2021)
- Nobody 2 (2025)

== Television ==
Year	Title	Role	Notes	Ref.
1989	Rodney Dangerfield: Opening Night at Rodney's Place	Boy No. 3	Television film	
1990	Tales from the Whoop: Hot Rod Brown Class Clown	Hot Rod Brown	Television film	
1990	1st & Ten	Chad	Episode: "If I Didn't Play Football"	
1990	Blossom	Unnamed boy	Episode: "Sex, Lies, & Teenagers"	
1991	Eerie, Indiana	Tripp McConnell	Episode: "The Dead Letter"	
1991	Roseanne	Jeff	Episode: "Valentine's Day"	
1992	Wild & Crazy Kids	Himself	Promo for Great Scott!	
1992	Great Scott!	Scott Melrod	Main role	
1994	Walker, Texas Ranger	Duane Parsons	Episode: "The Prodigal Son"	
1994	Spoils of War	Martin	Television film	
1994	A Child's Cry for Help	Peter Lively	Television film	
1996	Seduced by Madness	Chuck Borchardt	Television film	
1996	Duke of Groove	Rich Cooper	Short film	
2000	Saturday Night Live	Himself/host	Episode: "Tobey Maguire / Sisqo"	
2014	The Spoils of Babylon	Devon	Main role; also producer	
2023	Extrapolations	Nicolas	Episode: "2068: The Going-Away Party"	

== Video games ==
Year	Title	Voice role	Ref.
2002	Spider-Man	Peter Parker / Spider-Man	
2004	Spider-Man 2	Peter Parker / Spider-Man	
2007	Spider-Man 3	Peter Parker / Spider-Man	

== Music videos ==
Year	Title	Artist(s)
2000	"Things Have Changed"	Bob Dylan
2002	"Hero"	Chad Kroeger
2002	"What We're All About"	Sum 41
2004	"Vindicated"	Dashboard Confessional
2004	"We Are"	Ana Johnsson
2004	"Ordinary"	Train
