= Geoffrey Ogunlesi =

American music executive

Geoffrey "Geoff" Ogunlesi is an American music executive and talent manager. He is the founder and CEO of The Ogunlesi Group, a Los Angeles-based entertainment and music management company, and the son of Nigerian-born financier Adebayo Ogunlesi.

== Early life and education ==
Ogunlesi is the son of Adebayo "Bayo" Ogunlesi, co-founder of Global Infrastructure Partners (acquired by BlackRock in 2024), and optometrist Amelia Quist-Ogunlesi. His paternal grandfather, Theophilus Oladipo Ogunlesi, was the first Nigerian professor of medicine. He has a younger brother, Carl Ogunlesi, a music producer.

He attended the Hotchkiss School, a boarding school in Lakeville, Connecticut, and earned an undergraduate degree from Amherst College in Massachusetts (attended 2008–2012).

== Career ==
Ogunlesi began his career in artist and repertoire (A&R). He worked as an A&R consultant at Warner Music Group (2013–2014) and then spent nearly nine years in A&R at 300 Entertainment (approximately 2014–2022), where he worked with artists including Young Thug.

In 2022, he founded The Ogunlesi Group, a Los Angeles-based entertainment and music management company of which he is CEO and founder. The firm's roster has included Young Thug, Myles Frost, Alabama Barker, charlieonnafriday, and others. He has also received A&R credits on projects by Gunna, María Becerra, and additional releases associated with Young Thug.

In April 2024 he partnered with Chris DuBois and JD Groover to launch 1221 Artist Management while continuing to operate The Ogunlesi Group.

== Personal life ==
Ogunlesi was first linked with jewelry designer Jennifer Meyer (former wife of actor Tobey Maguire) in 2023; the couple made their red-carpet debut at the Baby2Baby Gala that November. They became engaged in August 2024. They welcomed a daughter in 2026 (around Father's Day). On 10 October 2026 they married at the Four Seasons Resort Lanai in Hawaii; Maguire officiated the ceremony.
