= Harold Scarborough =

British physician and medical author

Harold Scarborough CBE FRCP FRCPE FRSE (27 March 1909–22 August 1988) was a 20th-century British physician and medical author.

== Life ==
He was born in Leeds on 27 March 1909, the son of Elizabeth Menzies and her husband, Dr Oswald Lowndes Scarborough, a general practitioner. He was educated at Bridlington grammar school.

He studied medicine at the University of Edinburgh graduating with an MB ChB with honours in 1932. He then began at Edinburgh Royal Infirmary in the therapeutics department, also being a Demonstrator in Pharmacology at the University. He then studied for a doctorate (PhD) in biochemistry.

In the Second World War he served as principal medical officer for blood transfusions in south-east Scotland. In 1941 (during the war) he was elected a Fellow of the Royal Society of Edinburgh. His proposers were Alexander Robert Horne, John McMichael, David Murray Lyon, and E. D. W. Greig.

After the war he took up a Beit Memorial Fellow scholarship, which he had won before the war, to work at St Marys Medical School in London. In 1947 he won a Rockefeller Travelling Scholarship, which took him to Harvard Medical School for a year. In 1949 he joined Melville Arnott in Birmingham as a reader in medicine.

In October 1950 he received his first professorship: at the Welsh National School of Medicine in Cardiff, working with William Phillips, and also bringing in Paul Fourman, Peter Fentem, Keith Peters and Eldryd Parry. In 1963 he invited the Nigerian medical student Benjamin Oluwakayode Osuntokun to join the staff, forging a lifelong link with him and Nigeria.

From 1970 he began as a visiting professor to Ibadan in Nigeria. He then soon after accepted the post of dean at the then newly created Ahmadu Bello University in Zaria. He recruited his old friends Eldryd Parry and James Lowrie to take on teaching roles there. He was then asked to set up a new medical school at Maiduguri. He did a great deal to improve medical teaching and overall level of care in Nigeria.

He retired to Malta in 1984 and died there on 22 August 1988. He never married and had no children.

== Publications ==
- Textbook of Physiology and Biochemistry (1950 and multiple later editions) with George Bell and Norman Davidson (jointly known as BDS - Bell Davidson Scarborough)
