= Jennifer Meyer =

American jewellery designer (born 1977)

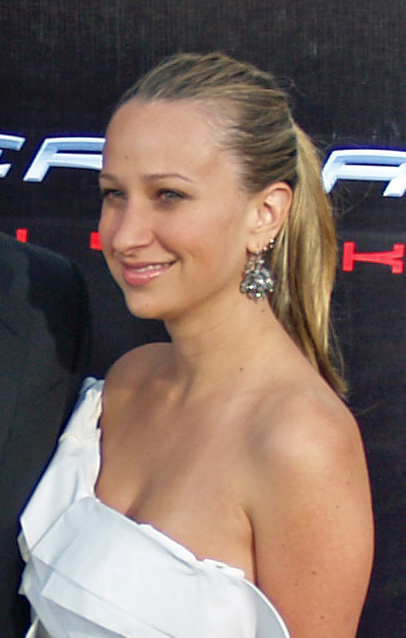
- Meyer at the premiere of Spider-Man 3 in 2007
- Born: April 23, 1977 (age 49); Los Angeles, California, U.S.
- Occupation: Jewelry designer
- Years active: 1999–present
- Spouses: Tobey Maguire (m. 2007; div. 2026); Geoffrey Ogunlesi (m. 2026)
- Children: 3
- Relatives: Ronald Meyer (father)
- Website: Official website

Jennifer Meyer (born April 23, 1977) is an American jewelry designer.

== Early life ==
Meyer was born on April 23, 1977 in Los Angeles, California, to a Jewish family. Her father is Ronald Meyer, who was the vice-chairman of NBC Universal until August 18, 2020, and was previously the president and CEO of Universal Studios. Her mother is Ronald Meyer's first wife, Ellen. Her stepfather is Rabbi David Baron (head of the Temple Shalom for the Arts), and her stepmother is Kelly Chapman Meyer. She got her start making jewelry alongside her grandmother, Edith Meyer, who began teaching Jennifer how to make enamel jewelry when she was six years old.

In 1999, having finished her child and family psychology studies at Syracuse University, she returned to Los Angeles. In Los Angeles she worked at Ralph Lauren and began designing jewelry pieces.

== Career ==
Meyer returned to her jewelry making roots and created her eponymous jewelry line in 2003. In 2004, she designed her trademark leaf-shaped 18-karat gold charm, which to her represents "turn[ing] over a new leaf". Her jewelry made its national debut when a Hollywood stylist picked out one of Meyer's leaf pendants for Jennifer Aniston to wear in The Break-Up in 2006.

The exposure led to Meyer founding her own company, Jennifer Meyer Jewelry, and her line of rings, charms, pendants, and necklaces is distributed through such luxury stores as Barneys New York and Net-a-Porter.com. She was named 2007 Jeweler of the Year in the Us Magazine "Hot Hollywood Style" issue. Her heart-shaped locket adorns the neck of Mary Jane Watson (Kirsten Dunst) as a gift from her boyfriend, Peter Parker (Tobey Maguire), in Spider-Man 3. In 2012, Jennifer Meyer Jewelry received an award from the CFDA/Vogue Fashion Fund, and in 2013, Meyer was nominated for the CFDA Swarovski Award for Accessories Design. In 2015, she designed the wedding ring for Jennifer Aniston's marriage to Justin Theroux, and the company commemorated their ten-year anniversary collaborating with Barneys on a twelve-piece ready-to-wear Fall collection, Barneys New York XO Jennifer Meyer.

In 2017, she was named on Hollywood's Top 20 Red Carpet Designers of 2017. In 2018, Meyer opened her first brick-and-mortar boutique as part of the Caruso Palisades Project and launched e-commerce on her website. In 2018, in response to the devastating Woolsey Fire in Malibu, Meyer donated 25% of one week of Jennifer Meyer Jewelry's online and in-store sales to Baby2Baby, a charity working to help families impacted by the California fires.

== Personal life ==
Meyer met actor Tobey Maguire in 2003, while he was shooting Seabiscuit at Universal Studios, and they became engaged in April 2006. Their daughter was born November 10, 2006. Meyer and Maguire married on September 3, 2007, in Kona, Hawaii. Their second child, a son, was born on May 8, 2009. In October 2016, Maguire and Meyer announced their separation. Meyer filed for divorce in 2020, and it was finalized in 2026.

In September 2024, Meyer announced her engagement to Geoffrey Ogunlesi, the son of Nigerian billionaire Adebayo Ogunlesi. In June 2026, she gave birth to their daughter. Meyer and Ogunlesi were married in Hawaii on October 10, 2026, with Maguire officiating.
