= Awojobi =

- Gender: Male
- Language: Yoruba

Origin
- Origin: Nigerian
- Region of origin: South-West Nigeria

Awojobi is a surname of Yoruba origin. Notable people with the surname include:

- Ayodele Awojobi (1937–1984), scholar and academic
- Tunji Awojobi (born 1973), Nigerian basketball player
- Oluyombo Awojobi (1951 - 2015), Nigerian rural surgeon
