= Tobey Maguire =

American actor (born 1975)

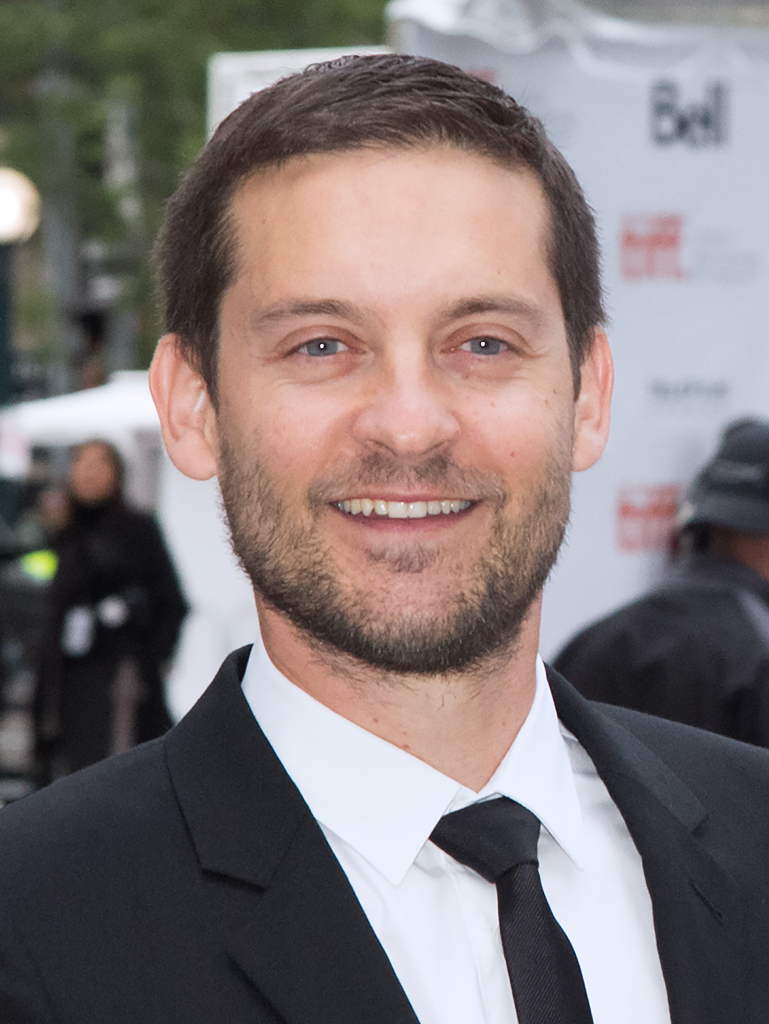
- Maguire at the 2014 Toronto International Film Festival
- Born: Tobias Vincent Maguire; June 27, 1975 (age 51); Santa Monica, California, U.S.
- Occupations: Actor; film producer
- Years active: 1989–present
- Works: Full list
- Spouse: Jennifer Meyer (m. 2007; div. 2026)
- Children: 2

Tobias Vincent Maguire (born June 27, 1975) is an American actor and film producer. He began his career in supporting roles, before gaining international recognition and critical praise for his role as Spider-Man in Sam Raimi's 2002 film Spider-Man. Maguire reprised the role in two sequels, Spider-Man 2 (2004) and Spider-Man 3 (2007). He returned to the role in Spider-Man: No Way Home (2021).

Maguire expanded his career with dramatic roles in Seabiscuit (2003), The Good German (2006), and The Great Gatsby (2013). He received critical acclaim and a Golden Globe Award nomination for Best Actor in a Motion Picture Drama for his role as a PTSD-stricken soldier in the war film Brothers (2009).

Outside of acting, Maguire has also produced several films, including 25th Hour (2002) and Seabiscuit. He later established his own production company, Material Pictures, in 2012 and co-produced Good People (2012), Pawn Sacrifice (2014), and Babylon (2022).

== Early life ==
Tobias Vincent Maguire was born on June 27, 1975, in Santa Monica, California, to Wendy Brown and Vincent Maguire. His parents, who were 18 and 20 respectively when he was born, were unmarried. Though they wed shortly after their son was born, they divorced when he was 3 years old. Maguire described his childhood as tough and lonely, with his father Vincent being convicted of robbing a bank in 1993. Maguire grew up poor and spent much of his childhood living with various family members and moving around often.

During his childhood, Maguire entertained the idea of becoming a chef and wanted to enroll in a home economics class as a sixth grader. His mother offered him $100 to take a drama class instead, and he agreed. The transient nature of his school years began to take a toll on Maguire emotionally, and after another relocation for his freshman year, he dropped out of high school and did not return. Instead, he decided to pursue an acting career. In his teenage years, Maguire suffered from drug abuse and alcoholism.

== Career ==
=== 1989–1995: Early career ===
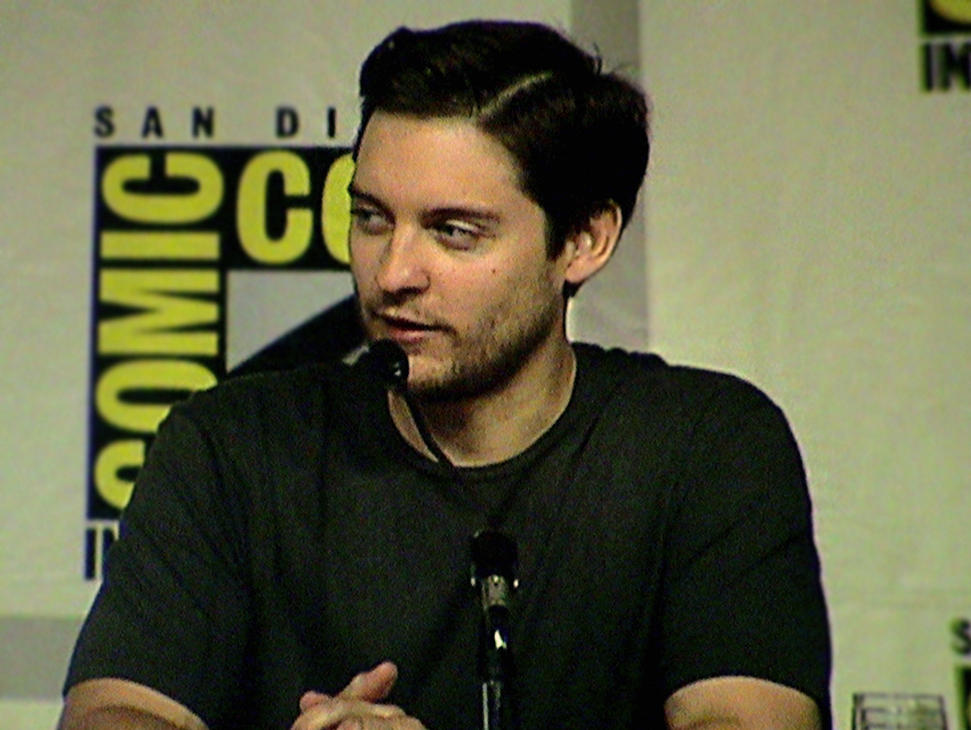
Maguire at the 2006 San Diego Comic-Con

Maguire's first appearance in a feature film was as an extra in The Wizard (1989). He was cast as the lead in the FOX TV series Great Scott! in 1992, which was canceled nine weeks after its premiere.

Maguire met fellow child actor Leonardo DiCaprio in the 1980s while auditioning for the same roles. The pair became close friends. They both auditioned for the same part in the 1990 TV series based on the 1989 comedy Parenthood. DiCaprio got the part, and Maguire was cast in a guest role partly on DiCaprio's recommendation. The same scenario played out during casting for the 1993 movie This Boy's Life (featuring Robert De Niro as the lead): DiCaprio got the main role of teenager Tobias "Toby" Wolff, while Maguire was cast as one of his friends.

=== 1995–2001: Critical acclaim ===
As part of his recovery from alcoholism and learning to deal with his self-described "addictive and compulsive nature", Maguire changed his career path slightly to seek roles that would not put him in direct competition with DiCaprio. The move paid off when Maguire was cast as Paul Hood (a teenage boarding school student whose narration anchors the action) in Ang Lee's 1997 film The Ice Storm. This led to a variety of lead roles in films, such as Pleasantville, The Cider House Rules, and Wonder Boys.

In the 1998 film Fear and Loathing in Las Vegas, Maguire portrayed a hitchhiker who meets Raoul Duke and Dr. Gonzo during their drive to Las Vegas. In Ride with the Devil (1999), opposite Jewel Kilcher, Maguire portrayed Jakob Roedel, the son of a unionist German immigrant who joins his Southern friends in the Missouri Riders, avenging the atrocities committed against Missourians by Kansas Jayhawkers and redleggers. Maguire voiced Lou in the movie Cats & Dogs (2001).

=== 2002–2013: Spider-Man and stardom ===
In 2002, Maguire starred as the title character in Spider-Man, based on the Marvel Comics superhero of the same name. The film was a major success and made him a star. His performance as Spider-Man earned him glowing reviews. Mark Caro of the Chicago Tribune wrote that, "with his big, round, soulful eyes, Maguire always has been able to convey a sense of wonder, and his instinct for understatement also serves him well here." That same year, he was credited as a producer on the film 25th Hour, and the next year, on Whatever We Do.

Maguire had a lead role as the jockey John M. "Red" Pollard in Seabiscuit (2003), based on Laura Hillenbrand's novel of the same name about the famous racehorse Seabiscuit. In addition to acting, he was also credited as an executive producer. In 2004, he reprised his role as Peter Parker in Spider-Man 2, which, like its predecessor, was a critical and commercial hit and is often considered to be one of the best superhero movies of all time. Due to the physical toll of filming Seabiscuit, Maguire was often absent from the set of Spider-Man 2; he was nearly fired and his role was offered to Jake Gyllenhaal. However, his girlfriend's father Ronald Meyer was able to help him secure the role. Maguire admitted his behavior toward the situation was "inappropriate" and that he learned his lesson. Gyllenhaal would later make his Spider-Man debut as Mysterio in 2019's Spider-Man: Far From Home.

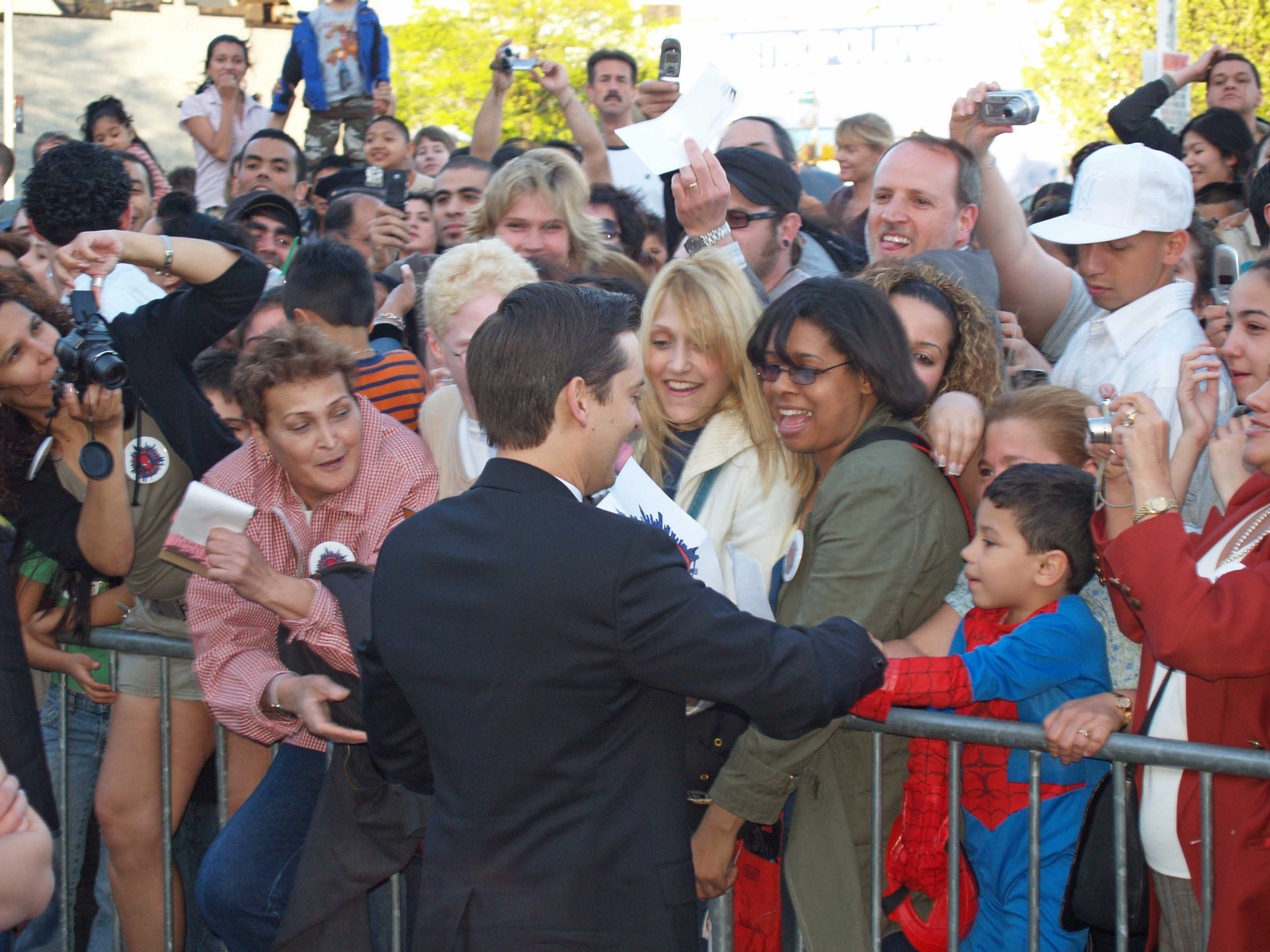
Maguire greets fans at a Spider-Man 3 premiere

In 2006, Maguire starred in his first villainous role as Corporal Patrick Tully opposite George Clooney and Cate Blanchett in Steven Soderbergh's The Good German, based on the Joseph Kanon novel of the same name. He next played Spider-Man in Spider-Man 3 (2007). The film was a box office hit, but received mixed reviews, with critics praising the cast and visual effects but criticizing the overabundance of villains. Plans for Spider-Man 4 were set in order, but despite the proposed addition of characters like the Vulture and Black Cat (with John Malkovich and Anne Hathaway in talks to play them), the film was ultimately cancelled due to director Sam Raimi feeling creatively constrained, the poor reception to the previous film, and script and production complications. Sony's Columbia Pictures decided to reboot the franchise instead. The film, titled The Amazing Spider-Man, was released on July 3, 2012, to a strong box office performance and generally positive reviews, with Andrew Garfield playing Peter Parker. It was followed by a sequel, The Amazing Spider-Man 2 (2014), which received mixed reviews and had a mediocre box office performance. The series was cancelled due to these factors, as well as a desire to integrate Spider-Man into the Marvel Cinematic Universe.

In 2008, he made a cameo appearance in the action comedy film Tropic Thunder as a gay 18th century monk in love with Father O'Malley, played by Robert Downey Jr., in the faux trailer for Satan's Alley. He was a last-minute replacement in the role, and due to previously scheduled commitments was only available to be on set for two hours to film his scenes. Near the end of Tropic Thunder, it is revealed that Maguire's character has been nominated for the Academy Award for Best Actor for Satan's Alley, which he loses to Tugg Speedman (Ben Stiller) for his role in Tropic Blunder, presented by Kirk Lazarus.

In 2009, Maguire starred alongside Gyllenhaal and Natalie Portman in the Jim Sheridan-directed war drama Brothers as Sam Cahill, a prisoner of war who returns from Afghanistan and starts suspecting that his wife has become romantically involved with his brother. He received critical acclaim and a Golden Globe nomination for his performance in the film. Of the nomination, Maguire said, "I had no expectation about getting a nomination, but I was watching nonetheless. My wife and my son got really excited. I was sort of surprised – I was like, 'Oh, wow.' And I couldn't hear the latter part of my name." Maguire lost to Jeff Bridges for his role in Crazy Heart. Maguire was set to star as The Writer in Life of Pi (2012), directed by Ang Lee, but was cut from the film during production for being "too famous" compared to the rest of the cast. He was replaced by Rafe Spall, with whom Lee reshot the scenes that had already been shot with Maguire.

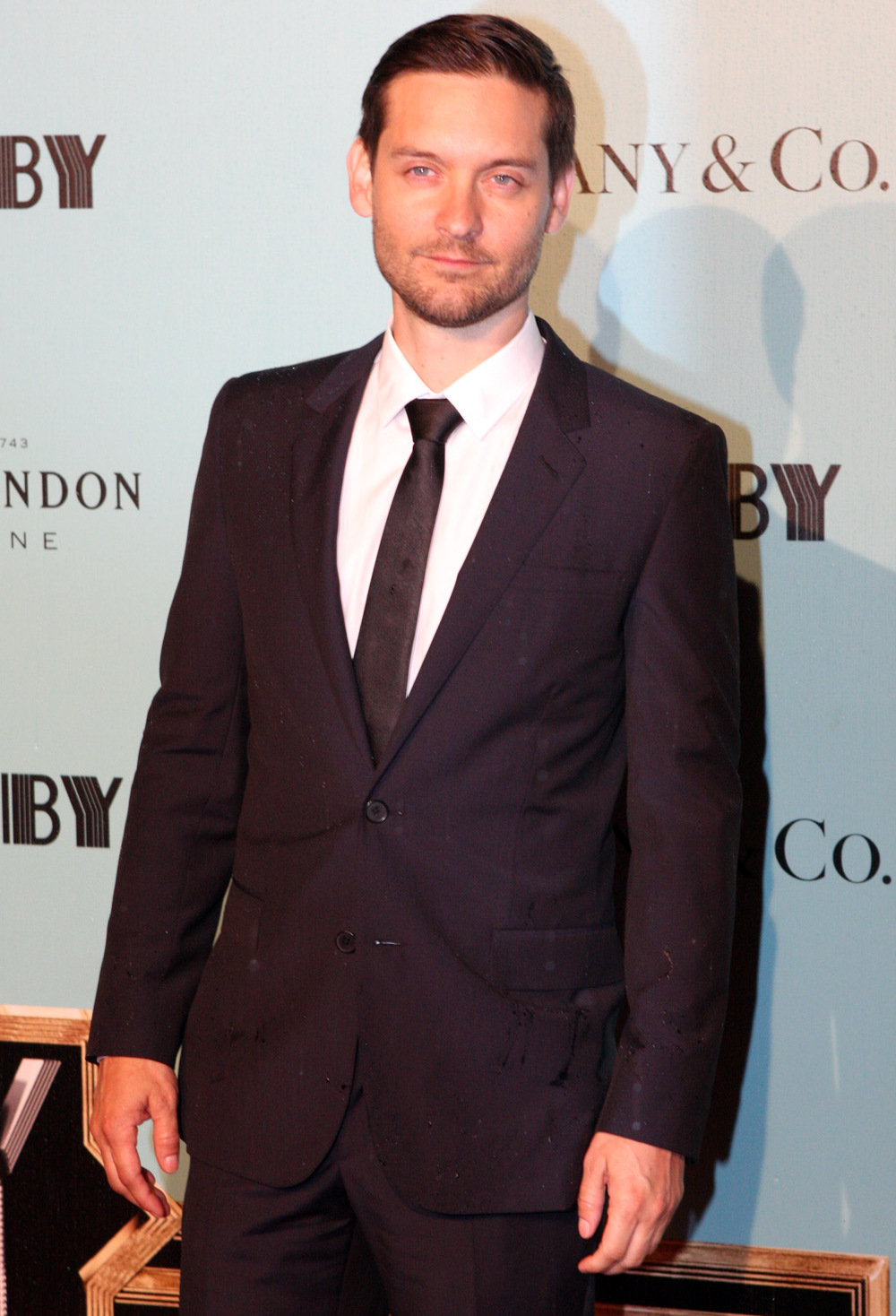
Maguire at the premiere of The Great Gatsby, 2013

In 2012, Maguire was a co-producer of Good People. That same year, he also established his own production company, Material Pictures, which secured independent financing in 2013 to help it produce more feature films. Maguire and DiCaprio once again performed together in Baz Luhrmann's remake of The Great Gatsby (2013); DiCaprio played the title role, while Maguire played the story's narrator, Nick Carraway.

=== 2014–present: Reduced output ===
His next film, Pawn Sacrifice (2014), was also co-produced by Material Pictures. It was a Cold War thriller based on the true story of American chess prodigy Bobby Fischer, played by Maguire. The film details the events leading up to and including the world chess championship in 1972, when Fischer challenges Soviet chess grandmaster and world champion Boris Spassky, acted by Liev Schreiber. The film received mostly positive reviews, but greatly underperformed at the box office.

Maguire voiced the adult version of Tim Templeton in the animated film The Boss Baby (2017), reuniting with Alec Baldwin after they previously collaborated in Cats & Dogs (2001). Maguire also reprised his role as Spider-Man in the Marvel Cinematic Universe film Spider-Man: No Way Home (2021) alongside successors Tom Holland and Garfield. The film was a critical and commercial success, grossing over 1 billion dollars, the first pandemic-era film to do so and the first since 2019's Star Wars: The Rise of Skywalker. He appeared in Damien Chazelle's ensemble film Babylon, also serving as an executive producer. He reprised his role as Spider-Man in Spider-Man: Across the Spider-Verse through archive footage.

== Personal life ==
Maguire has been a vegetarian since 1992; in 2009, he became a vegan. He has made changes in his diet to either gain or lose weight for film roles: he dramatically decreased his calorie intake for Seabiscuit, followed by a rapid increase to regain weight for Spider-Man 2. Maguire endorsed Democratic presidential candidates John Kerry in 2004, and Hillary Clinton in 2016. Maguire has been sober since age 19, having experienced "some difficulty" with alcohol in his late teens.

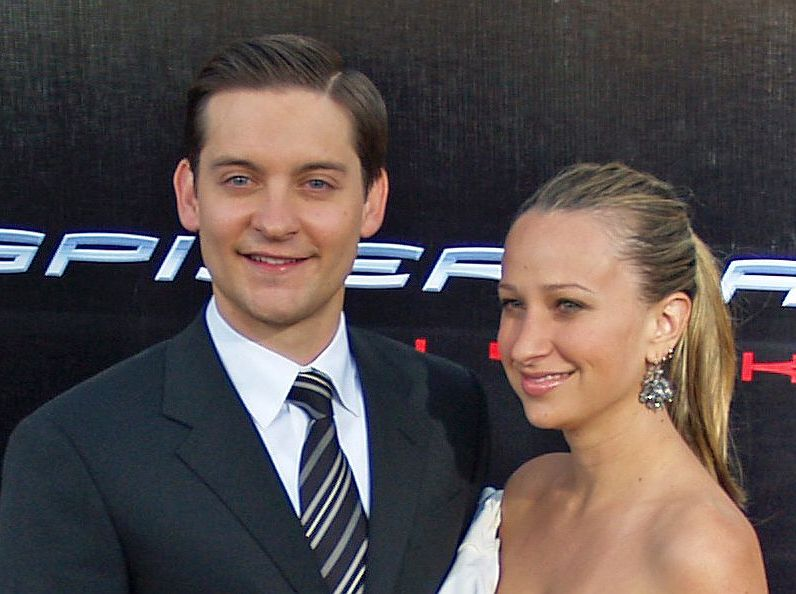
Maguire and then-wife Jennifer Meyer in 2007

In 2001, Maguire began dating his Spider-Man costar Kirsten Dunst, who played his onscreen love interest Mary Jane Watson. They split the next year but remained friends and continued to play love interests in the film series.

In 2003, Maguire met jewelry designer Jennifer Meyer while he was shooting Seabiscuit at Universal Studios, and they became engaged in April 2006. Their daughter was born in November that year. Meyer's father, Universal studios head Ronald Meyer, reportedly helped Maguire regain his job after being fired from Spider-Man 2 in 2003. Maguire and Meyer married on September 3, 2007, in Kailua Kona, Hawaii. Their second child, a son, was born in May 2009. On October 18, 2016, the couple announced their separation after nine years of marriage. In 2020, Meyer filed for divorce after four years of separation. In 2025, Maguire asked for joint physical and legal custody of their son, in response to Meyer's 2020 filing. The divorce was finalized in September 2026. The two remain friends, with Meyer calling Maguire "her best friend" and "the best ex-husband a girl could ever have." Maguire officiated Meyer's wedding to Geoffrey Ogunlesi, the son of Nigerian billionaire Adebayo Ogunlesi, in October 2026.

In 2018, Maguire began dating model Tatiana Dieteman, but they split after three years.

=== Poker ===
In 2004, Maguire took up tournament poker. He has finished in the money in several events and has been tutored by poker professional Daniel Negreanu. Maguire was seen on ESPN's coverage of the 2005, 2006, and 2007 World Series of Poker Main Event Championship. He was one of many celebrities, along with Leonardo DiCaprio and Ben Affleck, who participated in Molly Bloom's high-stake poker games at The Viper Room in the mid-2000s, and received negative press coverage for allegedly demanding Bloom "bark like a seal" for a $1,000 poker chip after a tournament he won. Maguire's actions at the game, as well as those of other celebrities, are portrayed by Michael Cera in the film Molly's Game through the composite character "Player X".

== Filmography ==
Maguire is best known for playing the title role in Spider-Man (2002) and its sequels Spider-Man 2 and Spider-Man 3, released in 2004 and 2007, respectively, along with Spider-Man: No Way Home (2021). He has also starred in Seabiscuit (2003), Brothers (2009), and Pawn Sacrifice (2014) and had supporting roles in The Great Gatsby (2013), The Boss Baby (2017), and Babylon (2022).

== Awards and nominations ==
Award	Year (Note: Indicates the year of ceremony. Each year is linked to the article about the awards held that year, wherever possible.)	Category	Nominated work	Result	Ref.
Black Reel Awards	2003	Best Film	25th Hour	Nominated	
Empire Awards	2005	Best Actor	Spider-Man 2	Nominated	
Golden Globe Awards	2010	Best Actor in a Motion Picture – Drama	Brothers	Nominated	
Kids' Choice Awards	2003	Favorite Male Butt Kicker	Spider-Man	Nominated	
Kids' Choice Awards	2005	Favorite Movie Actor	Spider-Man 2	Nominated	
MTV Movie & TV Awards	2003	Best Male Performance	Spider-Man	Nominated	
MTV Movie & TV Awards	2003	Best Kiss	Spider-Man	Won (Note: Shared with Kirsten Dunst)	
MTV Movie & TV Awards	2005	Best Hero	Spider-Man 2	Nominated	
MTV Movie & TV Awards	2008	Best Fight	Spider-Man 3	Nominated (Note: Shared with James Franco)	
MTV Movie & TV Awards	2022	Best Team	Spider-Man: No Way Home	Nominated (Note: Shared with Tom Holland and Andrew Garfield)	
National Movie Awards	2007	Best Performance by a Male	Spider-Man 3	Nominated	
People's Choice Awards	2005	Favorite Male Action Movie Star	Spider-Man 2	Nominated	
People's Choice Awards	2005	Favorite On-Screen Match-up	Spider-Man 2	Nominated	
People's Choice Awards	2008	Favorite On-Screen Match-Up	Spider-Man 3	Nominated	
Phoenix Film Critics Society Awards	2001	Best Actor in a Supporting Role	Wonder Boys	Nominated	
Prism Awards	2010	Performance in a Feature Film	Brothers	Nominated	
Saturn Awards	1999	Best Younger Actor/Actress	Pleasantville	Won	
Saturn Awards	2003	Best Actor	Spider-Man	Nominated	
Saturn Awards	2005	Best Actor	Spider-Man 2	Won	
Saturn Awards	2010	Best Actor	Brothers	Nominated	
Scream Awards	2007	Best Superhero	Spider-Man 3	Won	
Scream Awards	2007	"Jump-From-Your-Seat" Scene of the Year	Spider-Man 3	Nominated	
Screen Actors Guild Awards	2000	Outstanding Performance by a Cast in a Motion Picture	The Cider House Rules	Nominated	
Screen Actors Guild Awards	2004	Outstanding Performance by a Cast in a Motion Picture	Seabiscuit	Nominated	
Screen Actors Guild Awards	2023	Outstanding Performance by a Cast in a Motion Picture	Babylon	Nominated	
SFX Awards	2003	Best SF or Fantasy Film Actor	Spider-Man	Nominated	
Spike Video Game Awards	2004	Best Performance by a Male	Spider-Man 2	Nominated	
Tallinn Black Nights Film Festival	2019	Best Youth Film	Get Duked!	Won	
Teen Choice Awards	2000	Choice Movie Actor	The Cider House Rules	Nominated	
Teen Choice Awards	2000	Choice Movie: Liar	Wonder Boys	Nominated	
Teen Choice Awards	2002	Choice Movie Actor: Drama/Action-Adventure	Spider-Man	Won	
Teen Choice Awards	2002	Choice Movie: Chemistry	Spider-Man	Nominated	
Teen Choice Awards	2002	Choice Movie: Liplock	Spider-Man	Won	
Teen Choice Awards	2007	Choice Movie Actor: Action/Adventure	Spider-Man 3	Nominated	
Teen Choice Awards	2007	Choice Movie: Liplock	Spider-Man 3	Nominated	
Teen Choice Awards	2007	Choice Movie: Dance	Spider-Man 3	Nominated	
Teen Choice Awards	2007	Choice Movie: Rumble	Spider-Man 3	Nominated (Note: Shared with James Franco, Topher Grace & Thomas Haden Church)	
Teen Choice Awards	2010	Choice Movie Actor: Drama	Brothers	Nominated	
Toronto Film Critics Association Awards	2000	Best Supporting Performance – Male	Wonder Boys	Won (Note: Tied with Jeffrey Wright for Shaft)	
Young Artist Awards	1993	Best Young Actor in a New Television Series	Great Scott!	Nominated	

== See also ==
- Maguimithrax, a spider crab named after Maguire
- Filistata maguirei, a spider named after Maguire
