= Nancy Lenehan =

American actress (born 1953)

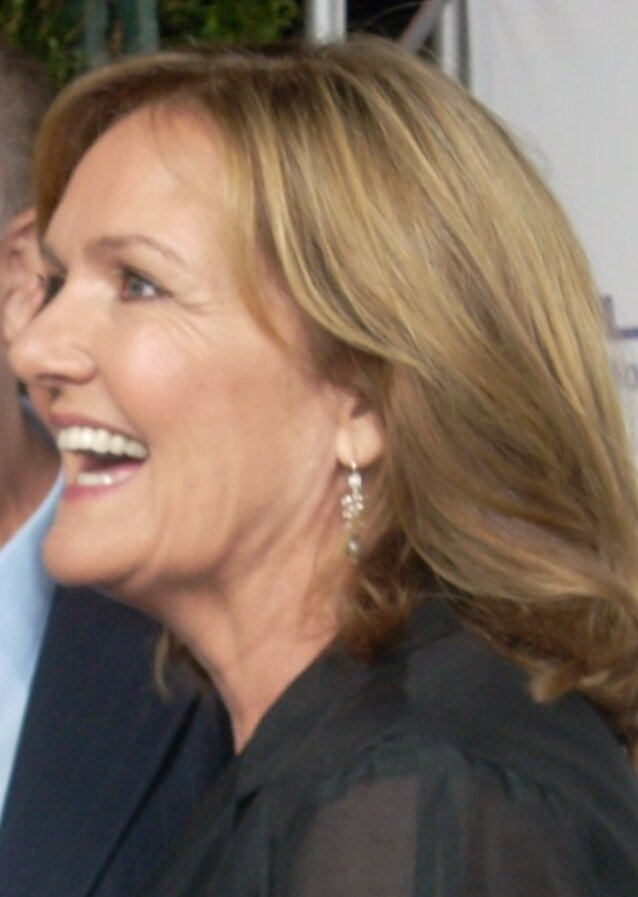
- Lenehan in 2008
- Born: April 26, 1953 (age 73); Long Island, New York, U.S.
- Education: Yankton College
- Occupation: Actress
- Years active: 1977–present

Nancy Lenehan (born April 26, 1953) is an American actress. She made her big screen debut appearing in the 1980 action comedy film Smokey and the Bandit II and later had supporting roles in films She's Having a Baby (1988), Pleasantville (1998), and Catch Me If You Can (2002). Better known for her television appearances, Lenehan was regular cast member in a number of short-lived sitcoms, including Great Scott! (1992), The Faculty (1996), Married to the Kellys (2003–04), Worst Week (2008–09), How to Be a Gentleman (2011), and People of Earth (2016–17). She also had recurring roles on Grace Under Fire, My Name Is Earl, Caroline in the City, Ellen, The New Adventures of Old Christine, and Veep.

== Early life and education ==
Lenehan was born on Long Island, New York. She attended Yankton College in Yankton, South Dakota.

== Career ==
Lenehan made her screen debut appearing in the 1979 made-for-television movie When She Was Bad... starring Cheryl Ladd and later guest-starred on Alice. She made her big screen debut in the 1980 action comedy film Smokey and the Bandit II playing the supporting role. The following years, Lenehan appeared in films The Incredible Shrinking Woman (1981), Jekyll and Hyde... Together Again (1982), Stoogemania (1986), Like Father Like Son (1987), She's Having a Baby (1988) and The Great Outdoors (1988). On television, Lenehan guest-starred on both comedy and dramas including Hill Street Blues, Family Ties, The Facts of Life, Fame, The Twilight Zone, Beauty and the Beast, The Tracey Ullman Show, Murphy Brown, Roseanne, The Golden Girls and Seinfeld. She provided the speaking and singing voice of Helen Henny from Chuck E Cheese's Pizza Time Theater restaurants from 1977 to 1980, then again from 1983-1986.

In 1992, Lenehan starred in the Fox short-lived sitcom Great Scott!. From 1993 to 1998 she had a recurring role in the ABC sitcom Grace Under Fire playing Audrey Sheffield. In 1996 she was regular cast member on the Meredith Baxter' sitcom The Faculty. She also had a recurring role on the ABC sitcom Ellen during its fourth season, playing the title character's realtor, Margaret Reed. She starred as Sandy Kelly, the matriarch in the ABC sitcom Married to the Kellys (2003–2004), and had a recurring role on My Name Is Earl (2005–2008) as Earl and Randy's mother, Kay Hickey. From 2008 to 2009, she co-starred on the short-lived CBS sitcom Worst Week.

Lenehan has appeared in featured, recurring and guest roles in more than 100 television shows, including Malcolm in the Middle, Everybody Loves Raymond, How I Met Your Mother, Judging Amy, Gilmore Girls, Caroline in the City (playing office manager Plum in two episodes in Season 4), Dharma & Greg, Buffy the Vampire Slayer, 3rd Rock from the Sun, ER, Boy Meets World, The Nanny, Quantum Leap, Just Shoot Me!, Ally McBeal, That '70s Show, Nip/Tuck, The New Adventures of Old Christine, The Middle, Black-ish, Superstore, Bless This Mess and Grace and Frankie. From 2014 to 2019 she had a recurring role as Nancy Ryan in the HBO comedy series, Veep. In 2023, she played Senator Jennings in the Amazon political thriller Jack Ryan.

== Filmography ==
=== Film ===
Year	Title	Role	Notes
1980	Smokey and the Bandit II	Ramona	
1986	Stoogemania	Connie Smoynek	
1988	She's Having a Baby	Cynthia	
1988	The Great Outdoors	Waitress	
1992	Roadside Prophets	Vegas Motel 9 Desk Clerk	
1992	Out on a Limb	Miss Clayton	
1998	Pleasantville	Marge Jenkins	
1999	The Limey	Lady On Plane	
2001	Human Nature	Puff's Mother	
2002	Full Frontal	Woman on Plane	
2002	Adaptation	Kaufman's Mother	
2002	Catch Me If You Can	Carol Strong	
2005	Beauty Shop	Mrs. Struggs	
2007	The Savages	Counselor	
2011	A Better Life	Mrs. Donnelley	
2014	Sex Tape	Linda	
2017	Battle of the Sexes	Billie's Mom	
2023	Self Reliance	Laurie	
2024	Night Swim	Kay	

=== Television ===
Year	Film	Role	Notes
1982	Hill Street Blues	Katy Moore	2 episodes
1982	Family Ties	Roberta	1 episode
1983	We Got It Made	Paulette	1 episode
1984	Faerie Tale Theatre	Georgette	1 episode
1985	Fame	Brenda Haskell	1 episode
1985	Tall Tales & Legends	Lyda	1 episode
1986	Heart of the City	Linda Kilmer	1 episode
1986	It's a Living	Phylis Caruso	1 episode
1987	The Tracey Ullman Show	Mrs. Warren, Courtney's Mom	2 episodes
1987	My Sister Sam	Judy	1 episode
1987	CBS Summer Playhouse	Vivian	1 episode
1987	Mr. President	Lenore	1 episode
1987	Beauty and the Beast	Lucy	1 episode
1987	Student Exchange	Mrs. Barton	Television film
1988	Newhart	Kristi Castetter	1 episode
1988	Beverly Hills Buntz	Mrs. Fairchild	1 episode
1989	ALF	Laverne Litwak	1 episode
1989	Paradise	Marti Brandt	1 episode
1989	Night Court	Ms. Abrams	1 episode
1989	Sister Kate	Mrs. Crenshaw	1 episode
1989	Parent Trap: Hawaiian Honeymoon	Mrs. Harris	Television film
1990	The Golden Girls	Nun	1 episode
1990	Murphy Brown	Sydney	1 episode
1990	Roseanne	Happy Customer	1 episode
1990	Dear John	Mrs. Williams	1 episode
1990	The Dreamer of Oz: The L. Frank Baum Story	Harriet Alvena Baum Neal	Television film
1991	Sisters	Joy Zimmer	2 episodes
1991	Nurses	Cheryl Pinson	1 episode
1991	Quantum Leap	Colleen McBain	1 episode
1992	Civil Wars	Paula Richardson	1 episode
1992	Great Scott!	Beverly Melrod	Main role, 7 episodes
1993	Dudley	Nancy	1 episode
1993	CBS Schoolbreak Special	Susan Thomas	1 episode
1993	Seinfeld (The Handicap Spot)	Volunteer	1 episode
1993	Bakersfield P.D.	Amy Baker	1 episode
1993–1998	Grace Under Fire	Audrey Sheffield	Recurring role, 12 episodes
1994	Step by Step	Mrs. Tubman	1 episode
1995	Mad About You	Dr. Wallach	1 episode
1996	The Faculty	Daisy Skelnick	Main role, 13 episodes
1996	Townies	Lila	1 episode
1996	The Cherokee Kid	Sister Faith	Television film
1996–1997	Ellen	Margaret Reed	4 episodes
1997	Boy Meets World	Susan Kalliback	1 episode
1997	3rd Rock from the Sun	Mrs. St. Clair	1 episode
1997	Ink	Nancy Milford	1 episode
1997	The Practice	Nurse MacKenzie	1 episode
1997	George and Leo	Mimi	1 episode
1998	Working	Meredith Hirsh	1 episode
1998	The Tony Danza Show	Mrs. Erlich	1 episode
1998	Caroline in the City	Plum	2 episodes
1998	Buffy the Vampire Slayer	Pat	Episode: "Dead Man's Party"
1999	ER	Edie Harvell	1 episode
1999	Dharma & Greg	Karen Love	2 episodes
1999	Zoe, Duncan, Jack and Jane	Mrs. Needles	1 episode
1999	Providence	Jane	1 episode
1999	Just Shoot Me!	Bunny	1 episode
1999–2000	Two Guys and a Girl	Dr. Peel	2 episodes
1999–2001	Felicity	Faye Rotundi	3 episodes
2000	Yes, Dear	Judy	1 episode
2000	Malcolm In the Middle	Christie / Helen	2 episodes
2001	FreakyLinks	Dr. Gibson	1 episode
2001	Judging Amy	Mrs. Hoeller	1 episode
2001	Gilmore Girls	LaDawn	1 episode
2001	Men, Women & Dogs	Jan	1 episode
2002	Ally McBeal	Principal Deborah Harkness	2 episodes
2002	Titus	Faye	1 episode
2002	Everybody Loves Raymond	Pamela	1 episode
2003	What I Like About You	Linda	1 episode
2003	That '70s Show	Nina's Mom	1 episode
2003	Eddie's Million Dollar Cook-Off	Mrs. Hadley	Television film, uncredited
2003–2004	Married to the Kellys	Sandy Kelly	Main role, 20 episodes
2004	Jack & Bobby	School Secretary	1 episode
2005	Joan of Arcadia	Erica Marx	1 episode
2005	Close to Home	Patty	2 episodes
2005	Nip/Tuck	Sue Alderman	1 episode
2005	The Bernie Mac Show	Sister Lane	1 episode
2005–2008	My Name Is Earl	Kay Hickey	Recurring role, 10 episodes
2006	Studio 60 on the Sunset Strip	Mrs. Jeter	1 episode
2006–2010	The New Adventures of Old Christine	Principal Marcie Nunley	Recurring role, 6 episodes
2007	My Boys	Eileen	1 episode
2008	Little Britain USA	Kelly Pincher	3 episodes
2008–2009	Worst Week	Angela Clayton	Main role, 16 episodes
2009	Accidentally on Purpose	Lara	1 episode
2011–2012	How to Be a Gentleman	Diane Carlson	Main role, 9 episodes
2012	The Middle	Penny	1 episode
2013–2014	How I Met Your Mother	Cheryl	2 episodes
2014–2019	Veep	Mrs. Ryan	Recurring role, 11 episodes
2016–2017	People of Earth	Margaret Flood	Main role, 20 episodes
2018–2020	Man with a Plan	Alice	2 episodes
2018	Champions	Maureen	1 episode
2018	Forever	Heather Jacoby	1 episode
2019	Black-ish	Barbara Piermont	1 episode
2019–2020	Bless This Mess	Deb	Recurring role, 13 episodes
2020	Superstore	Judy	1 episode
2021	Generation	Nonna	1 episode
2022	Grace and Frankie	Rosemary	1 episode
2022	A League of Their Own	Vivienne	2 episodes
2023	American Auto	Winnie	1 episode
2023	Jack Ryan	Senator Jennings	4 episodes
2023	All Rise	Camille Park	2 episodes
2024	Extended Family	Rose	1 episode
2024	The Boys	Dr. Barbara Findley	2 episodes
2025-present	The Paper	Ann	Recurring role, 9 episodes
2026	Widow's Bay	Gerrie Doyle	Recurring role; 6 episodes
