= Eldryd Parry =

British academic and physician (1930–2022)

Sir Eldryd Parry KCMG OBE MD FRCP
- Born: Eldryd Hugh Owen Parry; 27 November 1930; Cardiff, Wales
- Died: 13 November 2022 (aged 91); Chelsea, London, England
- Education: Shrewsbury School; Emmanuel College, Cambridge; Welsh National School of Medicine
- Occupations: Physician, academic
- Known for: Founder of the Tropical Health and Education Trust
- Awards: Officer of the Order of the British Empire (1982); Knight Commander of the Order of St Michael and St George (2011); Lifetime Achievement Award (2007)
- Scientific career
- Fields: Tropical medicine
- Workplaces: University of Ibadan; Haile Selassie University; Ahmadu Bello University; University of Ilorin; Kwame Nkrumah University of Science and Technology

Sir Eldryd Hugh Owen Parry KCMG OBE (27 November 1930 – 13 November 2022) was a British academic, physician and founder of the Tropical Health and Education Trust, which helps low- and middle-income country medical schools and hospitals to improve staff skill levels.

Parry attained an honorary DSc (Kumasi) and a number of honorary Fellowships and was a founding member of the Faculty of Medicine and Surgery, Amoud University, Somaliland. He founded the Tropical Health and Education Trust (THET) in 1988, and was the senior editor of Principles of Medicine in Africa (revised edition, 2004).

== Life and career ==
Eldryd Hugh Owen Parry was born in Cardiff on 27 November 1930. He was educated at Shrewsbury School and studied medicine at Emmanuel College, Cambridge. He held an honorary Fellowship, and at Cardiff University. He worked at the Royal Postgraduate Medical School in London before secondment to University College Hospital, Ibadan, Nigeria, in 1960. After three years at Haile Selassie University, Addis Ababa, Ethiopia, he returned to Nigeria in 1969 as the Chair of Medicine at Ahmadu Bello University, Zaria, Nigeria. in 1977 he took the post of Foundation Dean of Medicine, at the University of Ilorin, Nigeria. It was in Ilorin that he introduced a radical community-based programme, COBES with Professor Ladipo Akinkugbe. He was Dean and Professor of Medicine at the Kwame Nkrumah University of Science and Technology, Kumasi, Ghana, from 1980 to 1985.

He was an Honorary Fellow of the University of Cardiff and of the London School of Hygiene and Tropical Medicine, where he was also an Honorary Professor; an honorary Foundation Fellow at the College of Physicians and Surgeons of Ghana; and a Foundation Member of the Faculty of Medicine and Surgery of Amoud University, Somaliland.

In 2007, Parry received a lifetime achievement award from the Royal Society of Medicine for achievement in tropical medicine, and was made an Honorary Fellow of Emmanuel College, Cambridge. He was also an Honorary Fellow of the Royal College of Surgeons of England. He was appointed Officer of the Order of the British Empire (OBE) in 1982 and Knight Commander of the Order of St Michael and St George (KCMG) in the 2011 New Year Honours for services to healthcare development in Africa.

The third edition of Principles of Medicine in Africa won: Society of Authors and Royal Society of Medicine Book Awards Winner 2005 - Winner 2005 British Medical Association First Prize in its category 2005 - Winner.

Parry was married to the academic Helen Parry with whom he had four children and four grandchildren. Helen was pivotal in her long-term role at the London Institute for Contemporary Christianity, and in her teaching and engagement with overseas students. Eldryd Parry died at Chelsea and Westminster Hospital in Chelsea, London, on 13 November 2022, aged 91.
