= The Faculty (TV series) =

1996 American sitcom

- Genre: Comedy
- Created by: Gary Murphy; Neil Thompson
- Directed by: Tom Cherones; Will Mackenzie
- Starring: Meredith Baxter; Peter MacKenzie; Jenica Bergere; Peter Michael Goetz; Nancy Lenehan; Miguel A. Núñez, Jr.
- Composer: Ed Alton
- Country of origin: United States
- Original language: English
- No. of seasons: 1
- No. of episodes: 13

Production
- Production companies: Meredith Baxter Productions; Thompson-Murphy Productions; ABC Productions

Original release
- Network: ABC
- Release: March 13 – June 26, 1996

The Faculty is an American sitcom starring Meredith Baxter as a middle school administrator. The show aired on ABC from March to June 1996.

== Premise ==
Baxter played Flynn Sullivan, a divorced vice-principal balancing the demands of her career with single motherhood. The Faculty was notable among school-based programs for its focus on activity in Hamilton Middle School's faculty lounge, rather than in the classrooms. Co-creator Neil Thompson called it "an adult-based show," and said that the relationships among the school's staff were the central element.

The premiere episode featured Sullivan's decision whether to expel a student for painting graffiti on a school wall that accused a teacher of having sex with a sheep.

== Cast ==
- Meredith Baxter as Flynn Sullivan, school vice principal
- Jenica Bergere as Amanda Duvall, new math teacher
- Peter Michael Goetz as Herb Adams, school principal
- Nancy Lenehan as Daisy Skelnick, Herb's secretary
- Peter MacKenzie as Clark Edwards, a history teacher
- Miguel A. Núñez, Jr. as Luis Jackson, a school nurse
- Constance Shulman as Shelly Ray, Flynn's best friend and the school's most cynical teacher

== Episodes ==
No.	Title	Directed by	Written by	Original release date
1	"Pilot"	Will Mackenzie	Gary Murphy & Neil Thompson	March 13, 1996
Flynn Sullivan (Meredith Baxter) is a junior high vice-principal who must deal with a student accused of writing X-rated graffiti.
2	"Carlos Garcia"	Tom Cherones	Gary Murphy & Neil Thompson	March 20, 1996
The faculty creates a fictitious overachieving student named "Carlos Garcia" as a joke on new teacher Amanda (Jenica Bergere).
3	"Opportunity Knockers"	Will Mackenzie	Bill Bryan	March 27, 1996
Shelly Ray (Constance Shulman) is offered free treatment from a plastic surgeon if she does not report him to her insurance company after a car crash accident.
4	"Somewhere There's Music"	Will Mackenzie	Barbara Wallace & Thomas R. Wolfe	April 3, 1996
Flynn and Herb (Peter Michael Goetz) attempt to secure more funding for the school band from a frugal school board. Meanwhile, Shelly and Clark battle over a Civil War diary. Janet Hubert guest stars.
5	"Behavior Among Adults"	Will Mackenzie	Kim Friese	April 10, 1996
A sex education class becomes too hot to handle and Daisy (Nancy Lenehan) relinquishes control of the supply closet.
6	"Spirit Day"	Glenn Casale	Gary Murphy & Neil Thompson	April 24, 1996
Shelly has little enthusiasm for the school's annual "Spirit Day"--especially after she and Flynn have an argument that carries over into the day's festivities.
7	"Daisy's Secret"	Jeff Meyer	Cheryl Holliday	April 24, 1996
While Daisy serves jury duty, a temp discovers that school property is missing, leading the staff to wonder if their secretary is a thief. Dawnn Lewis guest stars.
8	"He's the Janitor"	Will Mackenzie	Gary Murphy & Neil Thompson	May 8, 1996
Flynn's been in a drought -- datewise -- since her divorce, but she really cleans up when she snags a contractor who's later hired as the school janitor. Lyman Ward, Angelo Tiffe and Michael McGrady guest star.
9	"Bus Stop"	Will Mackenzie	Bill Bryan	May 29, 1996
Clark and Shelly get lost on a field trip with a busload of kids. Meanwhile, back at the school, Flynn's pugnacious mother visits. Lynsey Bartilson and Bonnie Bartlett guest star.
10	"Parents' Night"	Jeff Meyer	Barbara Wallace & Thomas R. Wolfe	June 5, 1996
Flynn is stressed out over her job and agrees to take an experimental anti-anxiety drug; Amanda needs some mothering at her first parents' night; and Herb has a reunion date with a college sweetheart. Kathleen Noone, Pat Millicano and Marianne Muellerleile guest star.
11	"Clark's Crisis"	Tom Cherones	Cheryl Holliday	June 12, 1996
Flynn tries to lift the spirits of a dejected Clark after he and his wife separate. Amanda organizes a birthday party for Al, a school-bus driver. Jack McGee, Adrienne Evans and Mike Hagerty guest star.
12	"The Brain Teaser"	Glenn Casale	Kim Friese	June 19, 1996
Shelly sponsors a student in the Academic Challenge; Herb needs to lower his cholesterol and Luis offers his assistance. Ernest Liu and Troy Mallory guest star.
13	"Julie's Party"	Tom Cherones	Barbara Wallace & Thomas R. Wolfe	June 26, 1996
Flynn plans an 18th-birthday party for her daughter Julie (Sharon Annett), who's away at college; but when Julie backs out, mom is suspicious and visits her dorm. Cee Cee Michaela and Phil Buckman guest star.

== Background and production ==
Baxter said that the role of Flynn Sullivan appealed to her because it was a break with TV tradition, portraying an "intelligent, capable woman" who "isn't looked at a sexual object or as a target" and "doesn't need to be defended and protected and rescued." The Seattle Post-Intelligencer described Flynn as "90 percent dignity, 10 percent dizziness." Baxter said she "would love to go with less dignity" but compared the character to Mary Richards: "everyone around her can be a little nuts, but there has to be some center there that viewers can believe in."

In creating the show, Baxter knew she wanted to set it in a workplace as opposed to a family home, in contrast with her previous work (such as the hit 1980s sitcom Family Ties). She and her colleagues considered settings including a fashion magazine, an advertising agency and a newspaper before deciding on a school.

Baxter was also one of the show's executive producers, along with Thompson, whose parents and sister were teachers, and Gary Murphy.

== Response ==
The Faculty premiered on Wednesday, March 13, 1996 as a midseason replacement.

Reviews of the show were generally unfavorable. Matt Roush of USA Today said The Faculty "fails the critical tests of originality and pungency," although he called Baxter the show's "one unmistakable asset." Howard Rosenberg of the Los Angeles Times said the sitcom was "of light merit," comparing its characters unfavorably to the funnier school personalities of The Simpsons. Frederic Biddle of The Boston Globe was particularly negative, calling Baxter a failure as a physical comedian and decrying "the stick-figure boobies who pass for supporting characters."

In contrast, The San Diego Union-Tribune's John Freeman praised the show, calling its ensemble cast "notably strong" and naming Shulman and Goetz as stand-outs.

The Faculty won its time slot with its premiere episode, placing 34th in the weekly Nielsen ratings.
