= Benjamin Oluwakayode Osuntokun =

Nigerian medical researcher (1935–1995)

- Born: 6 January 1935; Nigeria
- Died: 22 September 1995 (aged 60)
- Known for: Tropical Neurology
- Awards: NNOM
- Scientific career
- Fields: Medicine
- Workplaces: University of Ibadan

Professor Benjamin Oluwakayode Osuntokun (6 January 1935 – 22 September 1995), was a researcher and neurologist from Okemesi, Ekiti State, Nigeria. Known for discovering the cause of ataxic tropical neuropathy, he was a founding member of the Pan African Association of Neurological Sciences and an early advocate and researcher on tropical neurology.

== Background ==
Benjamin O. Osuntokun was a pioneering Nigerian neurologist and researcher, authoring over 300 publications and presenting at more than 275 scientific conferences. He was a founding member of the Nigeria Society of Neurological Sciences and a founding fellow of the Pan African Association of Neurological Sciences, helping to shape neurological medicine in Africa. His research spanned tropical neurology, epilepsy, cerebrovascular diseases, and neuro-epidemiology, leaving a lasting impact on clinical practice and scientific understanding.

== Education ==
He had his primary and secondary education at the Holy Trinity School, Ilawe Ekiti, the Emmanuel School, Ado Ekiti and Christ's School Ado Ekiti. After finishing his secondary education, he studied medicine at the University College, Ibadan when it was still affiliated to the University of London.

== Research and career ==
In 1963, he was invited by Prof Harold Scarborough to spend a year at the Welsh National School of Medicine in Cardiff.

He joined the research staff of the University College, Ibadan in 1964, as a medical research fellow. However, upon gaining a Smith and Nephew fellowship, he went abroad for further studies under the direction of Henry Miller and John Walton, both eminent neurologists in Newcastle upon Tyne. After spending some time in Newcastle, he took a job at the National Hospital for Nervous Diseases, Queens Square, London before returning to Nigeria in 1965. It was at the University of Ibadan he launched a productive career, working on neuro-epidemiology and clinical and investigative neurology especially the study of dementia among Nigerians and African Americans.

In the late 1960s, he investigated cases of ataxic neuropathy in Epe where residents usually consume a dose of ill processed cassava with little or no supplement. He then mapped out the epidemiology of the neuropathy and was able to study the basic aspects of the neuropathy. He discovered the disease was due to cyanide intoxication. At the time, little was done beyond clinical attention to the disease. His success in discovering the basis of tropical ataxic neuropathy earned him local and international acclaim in the medical community.

Throughout his career, he wrote a number of scholarly works on his prodigious research on tropical epidemiology and was also Dean of Medicine at the University of Ibadan and later the Chief Medical Officer of that university's teaching hospital, UCH. He died in 1995 and was buried in his native Okemesi, Ekiti State.

The onset of neuropathy after ingestion of ill-processed Cassava, due to Cyanide Intoxication, is known as the Osuntokun's Sign, and is commonly used in African Medical Lectures and Bulletins, but is not much known to countries outside Africa.

== Publications ==
- Oluwole OS, Onabolu AO, Link H, Rosling H (Jul 2000). "Persistence of tropical ataxic neuropathy in a Nigerian community". J Neurol Neurosurg Psychiatry. 69 (1): 96–101. doi:10.1136/jnnp.69.1.96. PMC 1736992. PMID 10864612.
- Osuntokun BO, Monekosso GL, Wilson J (Mar 1, 1969). "Relationship of a degenerative tropical neuropathy to diet: report of a field survey". Br Med J. 1 (5643): 547–550. doi:10.1136/bmj.1.5643.547. PMC 1982268. PMID 5764702.
- Osuntokun BO, Durowoju JE, McFarlane H, Wilson J (Sep 14, 1968). "Plasma amino-acids in the Nigerian nutritional ataxic neuropathy". Br Med J. 3 (5619): 647–9. doi:10.1136/bmj.3.5619.647. PMC 1986512. PMID 5673213.
- Osuntokun BO (Jun 1968). "An ataxic neuropathy in Nigeria. A clinical, biochemical and electrophysiological study". Brain. 91 (2): 215–48. doi:10.1093/brain/91.2.215. PMID 5721927.
