= Abedo =

Afghani commander

Abedo is an Afghan former mujahideen commander and militia leader from Helmand Province, Afghanistan. She led mujahideen fighters during the Soviet–Afghan War and later formed a local militia after the Taliban burned her shop. Her fate since the Taliban takeover in 2021 is unknown.

== Biography ==
=== Soviet–Afghan War ===
Abedo was married to a mujahid, and she fought in the Soviet–Afghan War, initially disguising herself as a man. After her husband was killed in battle in 1987, she commanded 200 mujahideen fighters.

=== Later life ===
After the Soviet withdrawal in 1989, Abedo returned to her village, where she opened a shop and sold goods to people she had fought alongside. She raised her children, later had grandchildren, and was well respected by her neighbours.

During the war in Afghanistan, both the Taliban and the U.S.-backed government pressured her not to sell to the other side, and she refused to take either side. After the Taliban set fire to her shop, she recruited ten young men for a small militia with the government's approval to keep the peace in her area.

Her fate after the fall of Kabul in August 2021 is unknown; Bohannon reported that none of the people she contacted could say whether Abedo had survived it.

== In literature ==
In Eve (2023), Cat Bohannon presents Abedo as a modern example of the knowledge and leadership older women can provide. She uses Abedo to illustrate ideas related to the grandmother hypothesis in her chapter on menopause.
