= Lagos State College of Health Technology =

Lagos State College Of Health Technology
- Type: Public
- Established: 1920
- Location: Yaba, Lagos State, Nigeria
- Website: www.lascohet.edu.ng

Lagos State College of Health Technology, fondly called LASCOHET, is one of the oldest college of health technology in Nigeria and was established in 1920.

== History ==
Lagos State College of Health Technology, formerly known as School of Hygiene was established in 1920 by Dr I. Oladipo Oluwole based on the prevailing health situations and low human health resources available in the community. The then School of hygiene offered six major health courses before incorporating the training of community midwives and nurses into its program between 1957 and 1966.

On the 21st of February, 1977, Lagos State College of Health Technology, under the directive of the Federal Military Government was transformed from a School of hygiene to a School of Health Technology as a result of the Third National Development Plan (1975 – 1980) on National Basic Health Service Scheme (NBHSS) which mandated the train middle level manpower for the health sector.

On the 22nd of January, 2004, Lagos State College of Health Technology's establishment was assented by the former Governor of Lagos State, Asiwaju Bola Ahmed Tinubu and the Lagos state college of health technology's governing council was constituted and inaugurated in July, 2012 by Babatunde Raji Fashola’s Administration

== Governing Council ==
The governing council of Lagos State College of Health Technology is usually led by a chairman, representative of the ministry of education and 2 members of the teaching staff of the college.

== Academics ==
Lagos state college of health technology is divided into six schools:

- School of Environmental Health
- School of Pharmacy Technician
- School of Health Information Management
- School of Community Health
- School of Complementary Health Sciences
- School of Medical Laboratory

== Location ==
Lagos state college of health of technology is located in Alagbomeji, Yaba, an environment that accommodates several other government institutions like; Queen's College, the Nigerian Institute of Medical Research, the Yaba College of Technology, Igbobi College, the University of Lagos, the Federal Science and Technical College, and the Federal College of Education.

== See also ==
- Bauchi State College of Nursing and Midwifery
