= Oluyombo Awojobi =

Nigerian Rural Surgeon

- Born: March 1, 1951
- Died: April 17, 2015 (Aged 64)
- Education: University of Ibadan
- Known for: Rural Surgery; Awojobi Clinic Eruwa
- Spouse: Tinu Awojobi
- Relatives: Abiola Arowojolu & Folake Ozoro (Sisters); Yinka Awojobi, Ayodele Awojobi & Busola Awojobi (Brothers)

Dr. Oluyombo Adetilewa Awojobi (March 1, 1951 – April 17, 2015) was a Nigerian Rural Surgeon, Researcher, Inventor and Humanitarian. He was best known for his services rendered at Awojobi Clinic, Eruwa (ACE) in Ibarapa East Local Government Area of Oyo State.

He is credited with pioneering the local development and production of innovative, appropriate medical devices.

== Early life ==
He was born to Chief Daniel Adekoya Awojobi, a stationmaster at the Nigerian Railway Corporation who hailed from Ikorodu in Lagos State and Comfort Bamidele Awojobi (née Adetunji), a petty trader who hailed from Modakeke, Ile-Ife, Osun State in March 1951. He attended CMS Grammar school between 1963 and 1969. He went on to study Medicine and Surgery at College of Medicine, University of Ibadan where he graduated with a distinction in Surgery in 1975 He won the Adeola Odutola prize for the Best Final Year Medical Student.

== Career ==
Dr. Awojobi started his career at the University College hospital, Ibadan as a surgical resident between 1977 and 1983. He moved to rural medical practice in Eruwa at the District Hospital on August 25, 1983. He however resigned from his appointment and established Awojobi Clinic, Eruwa (ACE), on October 27, 1986 where he served till his death.

He was known for pioneering the development of local production of innovative appropriate medical devices. Equipment used in Awojobi clinic such as the operating table, autoclave, water distiller, pedal suction pump and haematocrit centrifuge were designed and fabricated by him. He also produced intravenous fluids and surgical sutures locally. These factors made receiving care at Awojobi Clinic affordable and hence drew patients from distant communities.

He was listed as a caring physician of the world by the World Medical Association in 2005.

He hosted the Operation Hernia charity at Awojobi clinic in 2013 and together, they operated 70 patients with inguinoscrotal hernias over a period of 6 days.

Before he died, he set up the Olajide Ajayi Cancer Centre.

== Personal life ==
He was married to Tinu Awojobi, a radiographer and they had 2 children, Yombo and Ayodele.

== Legacy ==
The Dr Oluyombo Adetilewa Awojobi's Prize for Best Graduating Student in Biomedical Engineering at The Bells University, Ota was endowed in his honour.

A documentary about his life titled 'An Uncommon Service: A tribute to Dr. Awojobi' was screened at the iREP monthly documentary film screening series at Freedom Park, Lagos.

== Publications ==
- Modified pile suture in the outpatient treatment of haemorrhoids - Oluyombo A Awojobi, 1983
- Abdominal incisional hernia in Ibadan - Oluyombo A Awojobi, S O Itayemi, 1983
- Use of Foley catheter in suprapubic punch cystostomy: An adaptation - Oluyombo A Awojobi, 1983
- Paediatric inguinoscrotal surgery in a district hospital- Oluyombo A Awojobi, J K Ladipo, A C Sagua, 1988
- Sutureless circumcision - Oluyombo A Awojobi, 1992
- The hospital water still - Oluyombo A Awojobi, 1993
- Principles of rural surgical practice - Oluyombo A Awojobi, 1998
- The manual haematocrit centrifuge - Oluyombo A Awojobi, 2002
- A review of surgical cases and procedures in rural Nigeria - Oluyombo A Awojobi, 2002
- Epidural needle and intraosseous access - Oluyombo A Awojobi, 2003
- 20 years of primary care surgery in Ibarapa - Oluyombo A Awojobi, 2004
- Inguinal hernia in Nigeria - Oluyombo A Awojobi, AA Ayatunde 2004
- Spontaneous appendicocutaneous fistula: A case report - O M Tokode, Oluyombo A Awojobi, 2004
- Surgical training in Nigeria: a reappraisal - Oluyombo A Awojobi, 2005
- The travails of rural surgery in Nigeria and the triumph of pragmatism - Oluyombo A Awojobi, 2005
- Atraumatic sutures can be made locally - Oluyombo A Awojobi, 2005
- Engineering fabrication in the rural Nigerian medical practice - Oluyombo A Awojobi, 2007
- Rising to the challenge of rural surgery - Oluyombo A Awojobi, 2010
- Rural based medical practice in Nigeria - The Ibarapa Experience - Oluyombo A Awojobi, 2011
