= Great Scott! (TV series) =

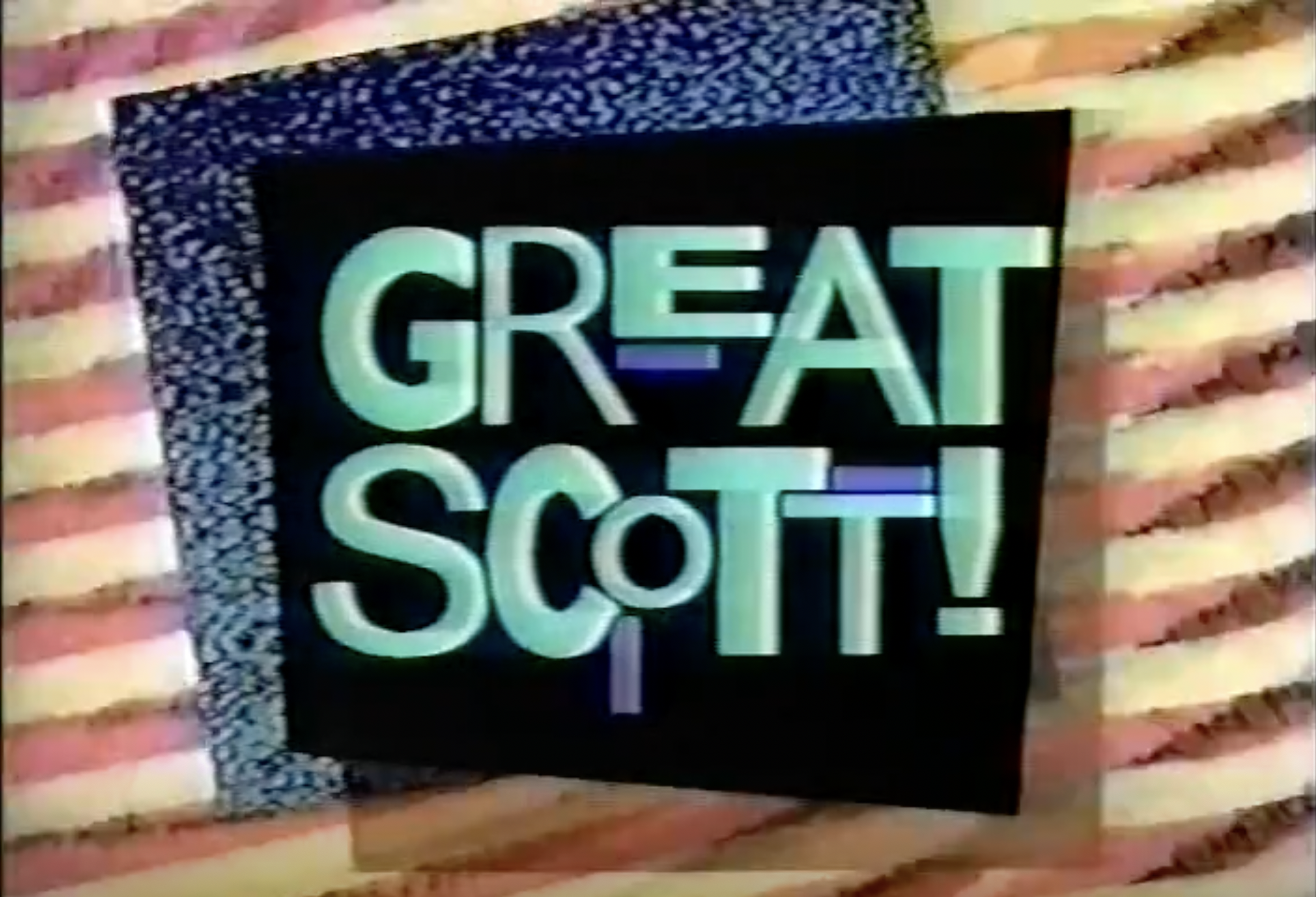
- Genre: Sitcom
- Created by: Tom Gammill; Max Pross
- Starring: Tobey Maguire; Nancy Lenehan; Ray Baker; Sarah Koskoff; Kevin Connolly; Vinessa Shaw
- Theme music composer: Mark Mothersbaugh
- Composers: Mark Mothersbaugh; Hummie Mann
- Country of origin: United States
- Original language: English
- No. of seasons: 1
- No. of episodes: 13 (7 unaired)

Production
- Producers: Peter Schindler; Todd Stevens (pilot only)
- Camera setup: Single-camera
- Running time: 30 minutes
- Production companies: Claverly One Productions; Castle Rock Entertainment

Original release
- Network: Fox
- Release: October 4 – November 29, 1992

Great Scott! is an American sitcom starring Tobey Maguire and Kevin Connolly that premiered on Fox on September 27, 1992, and aired from October 4, 1992, until it was abruptly cancelled on November 29 of the same year. It was created by Tom Gammill and Max Pross, and produced by Castle Rock Entertainment and Claverly One Productions.

Great Scott! would come to serve as Tobey Maguire's first starring role in a TV series and later in his career, he became famously known for portraying the role of Peter Parker in Spider-Man (2002).

== Premise ==
The show centered on 15-year-old Scott Melrod (Maguire), a freshman at Taft High School, and his vivid imagination. The main gimmick of the show is the audience experiencing Scott's imagination in different situations he is put in. This is shown multiple times in all known episodes.

== Cast ==
- Tobey Maguire as Scott Melrod
- Nancy Lenehan as Beverly Melrod - Scott's Mother
- Ray Baker as Walter Melrod - Scott's Father
- Sarah Koskoff as Nina Melrod - Scott's Younger Sister
- Kevin Connolly as Larry O'Donnell - Scott's Best Friend
- Vinessa Shaw as Carolyn - Scott's Crush/Dream Girl

== Episodes ==
No.	Title	Directed by	Written by	Original release date
1	"Pilot"	Bradley Silberling	Tom Gammill & Max Pross	October 4, 1992
Scott's dream date decides to give him another chance.
2	"Hair Scare"	Bradley Silberling	Tom Gammill & Max Pross	October 18, 1992
Scott tries to change his attitude to impress a rebellious girl, who takes him to the salon she works at to change his look. After getting into an altercation with Scott's mom at the salon, she is then fired. When she decides to egg a house where Scott's mom is at a party, Scott is forced to decide which woman means more to him.
3	"Choir Mire"	Bradley Silberling	Tom Gammill & Max Pross	October 25, 1992
After flunking out of an advanced class, Scott tries to get into a new class, but is beset by problems. Eventually he is put into choir alongside his sister.
4	"Stone Moan"	Niels Mueller	Tom Gammill & Max Pross	November 1, 1992
Scott becomes enemies with a math teacher when he defends a girl in math class.
5	"Stripe Gripe"	Rick Berger	Michael Curtis & Gregory S. Malins	November 8, 1992
When Larry gets injured, Scott has to take over as mascot, annoying him to no end. A drifter offers to be the mascot, but Scott realizes he may have traded one problem for another.
6	"Pyrrhic Lyric"	Andy Tennant	Ken LaZebnik	November 29, 1992
Procrastinating on a poem, Scott finds it a good idea to plagiarize thrash metal band Exodus's "Good Day to Die" from their 1992 album Force of Habit. He gets praise for the poem he plagiarized, and begins to worry that the band will hunt him down for stealing their song.
7	"Book Crook"	Dean Parisot	Maria Semple	Unaired
8	"Vacation Tribulation"	Bradley Silberling	Jay Kogen & Wallace Wolodarsky	Unaired
9	"Whatta Sloppy Photocopy"	Matia Karrell	Jeremiah Bosgang	Unaired
10	"Royal Toil"	John Fortenberry	George Meyer & Maria Semple	Unaired
11	"Thief Grief"	Alex Zamm	Michael Curtis & Gregory S. Malins	Unaired
12	"Garage Barrage"	Bradley Silberling	Tim Kelleher	Unaired
13	"Date Bait"	Gerald Hughes	Jeff Schaffer & Alec Berg	Unaired

Jack Black and Marley Shelton guest starred in the unaired episode "Book Crook".

== User Rating ==
Great Scott! Had an overall IMDb user rating of 7.1/10 based on a small number of viewers review. Audience response varied in the United States audience with a rating of 6.6/10 and the United Kingdom with a rating of 8.2/10. these ratings reflect mixed audience response but doesn't imply reasons for the show cancellation.

== Cancellation ==
Great Scott! was cancelled due to its poor ratings, ranking 136th out of 139 television shows that ran ABC, CBS, NBC and Fox during the 1992 to 1993 television season. It was rated a 4.2, the highest on the list being rated a 21.9, and the lowest being a 4.0. Despite its cancellation in the states, all 13 produced episodes are known to have aired on German Television station RTL Zwei, though the status of these German variants are unknown. The German version of Great Scott! is known as Super Scott!.
