= The Good German =

2006 film by Steven Soderbergh

- Theatrical release poster
- Directed by: Steven Soderbergh
- Screenplay by: Paul Attanasio
- Based on: The Good German by Joseph Kanon
- Produced by: Ben Cosgrove; Gregory Jacobs
- Starring: George Clooney; Cate Blanchett; Tobey Maguire
- Cinematography: Peter Andrews
- Edited by: Mary Ann Bernard
- Music by: Thomas Newman
- Production companies: Virtual Studios; Section Eight
- Distributed by: Warner Bros. Pictures
- Release date: December 15, 2006
- Running time: 105 minutes
- Country: United States
- Language: English
- Budget: $32 million
- Box office: $6 million

The Good German is a 2006 American neo-noir crime film. A film adaptation of Joseph Kanon's 2001 novel, it was directed by Steven Soderbergh and stars George Clooney, Cate Blanchett, and Tobey Maguire. Set in Berlin following the Allied victory over the Nazis, it begins as a murder mystery, but weaves in elements involving the American postwar employment of Nazi rocket scientists in Operation Paperclip.

The film was shot on black-and-white film and is designed to imitate the appearance of film noir from the 1940s, although it also includes material – such as sex scenes and swearing – that would have been prohibited by the Production Code. Its poster is an homage to the poster for Casablanca (1942, also from Warner Bros. Pictures), as is the closing scene at an airport. Besides being shot in black and white, the film was also shot in the traditional 1.37:1 aspect ratio (known as the Academy ratio), which declined in use from about 1953. The DVD release keeps the original aspect ratio, though the theatrical release, and other DVD Releases, used the slightly more modern but still unusual 1.66:1 ratio.

The film was released by Warner Bros. Pictures on December 15, 2006, receiving mixed reviews, and grossed $6 million worldwide against a budget of $32 million. It was nominated for the Berlin International Film Festival Golden Bear and the Academy Award for Best Original Score.

== Plot ==
In June 1945, Jacob "Jake" Geismer, an American war correspondent for The New Republic, returns to Berlin during the Potsdam negotiations between the Allied powers after World War II is over in Europe, but before hostilities end in Asia. Jacob witnesses his murdered driver, a black marketeering American soldier named Tully, being fished from a river, suspiciously adjacent to the Potsdam conference grounds. The corpse is discovered to be in possession of 50,000 reichsmarks, which are later revealed to have been printed by the U.S. occupying forces.

Geismer becomes entwined in both the mystery of his murdered driver and the clandestine search by both Soviet and American forces for the missing German Emil Brandt. He becomes more involved in both mysteries, as his investigation intersects with his search for Lena Brandt, a Jew married to Emil. Geismer had been in a relationship with Lena during his first stint as a journalist in prewar Berlin. She has survived the Holocaust by doing "what she had to" to stay alive — early in the film this is assumed to be prostitution, but Lena (based loosely on the Jewish collaborator Stella Goldschlag) is later revealed to be secretly complicit in the deportation of her fellow Jews.

Emil Brandt is a former SS officer, who had been the secretary of Franz Bettmann, chief production engineer of the V-2 rocket at concentration camp Mittelbau-Dora/Mittelwerk. (Bettmann is only a minor character in the film; he appears to be based on the real Arthur Rudolph.) The Soviets, the Americans, and the British all try to get hold of Emil Brandt, for different reasons. The Americans have already detained Bettmann in a safehouse and intend to transport him to the U.S. as part of their Operation Overcast/Paperclip to have him work on their own rocket program . They are fully aware of Bettmann's role at Camp Dora and know about the slave labor used in the V-2 program, but want to cover up his involvement (because they could not lawfully employ a known war criminal), which includes eliminating Emil Brandt, whose testimony or written notes could prevent the cover-up.

Geismer, in his attempts to get Lena out of Berlin, becomes more and more involved in the search for Emil Brandt. At one point, Lena gives Emil's notes on Camp Dora to Geismer. When Lena and Geismer try to hand Emil Brandt over to the American prosecutor charged with handling war crimes cases, they are intercepted by the American authorities, who want to protect Bettmann, and Brandt is murdered. Geismer still has Brandt's notebooks, however, which he trades to the war crimes investigators of the U.S. Army (who have turned out to be in league with the other American authorities — the ones who want to keep the evidence confidential to whitewash Bettmann) in exchange for a Persilschein (a denazification document) and a visa for Lena, so she can leave Germany.

== Cast ==
- George Clooney as Captain Jacob "Jake" Geismer
- Cate Blanchett as Lena Brandt
- Tobey Maguire as Corporal Patrick Tully
- Beau Bridges as Colonel Muller
- Tony Curran as Danny
- Leland Orser as Captain Bernie Teitel
- Jack Thompson as Congressman Breimer
- Robin Weigert as Hannelore
- Ravil Isyanov as General Sikorski
- Dave Power as Lieutenant Hasso Schaeffer
- Christian Oliver as Emil Brandt
- Don Pugsley as Gunther
- Dominic Comperatore as Levi

== Production ==
Screenshot illustrating the film's use of a Classical Hollywood visual style, including black-and-white photography and a 1.37:1 aspect ratio

The film imitates the appearance of films from Classical Hollywood studio era. Most of the scenes were shot on soundstages and on Universal Studios' backlot and were then edited with archival Russian footage and archived film from Corbis. Although the finished film is in black and white, it was shot in color because this allowed the use of faster film than available black-and-white film stocks and afforded the ability to use 'green screen' techniques. The color was then reduced in postproduction through the use of a digital intermediate to a grainier black and white, to blend with the carefully restored archival material.

Unlike modern films that are shot with significant "coverage" and mostly with close-ups or two shots, The Good German was shot with 1940s-era wide angle lenses, such as a 32 mm, with deep focus, "strongly accented camera angles", and entire scenes staged. Director Steven Soderbergh said:

that kind of staging is a lost art, which is too bad. The reason they no longer work that way is because it means making choices, real choices, and sticking to them ... That's not what people do now. They want all the options they can get in the editing room.

The set lighting was entirely incandescent, and the audio was recorded on a boom mike instead of the more modern body mikes or automated dialogue replacement. These decisions, combined with the limited coverage, allowed the rough cut to be produced in two days after wrapping up filming.

=== Title and theme ===
"Good Germans" is a term referring to German citizens during and after World War II who claimed not to have supported the Nazi regime, but remained silent and did not resist in a meaningful way. In addition, the title is an allusion to the phrase common among soldiers of the Allied Powers during the invasion of Europe after D-Day, that "The only good German is a dead German" — and the consequences of this death are seed for all that follows in the story of the film. Thematically, the film centers on guilt, and whether surviving the atrocities is possible, while being unaware of and not complicit in them.

== Reception ==
=== Box-office ===
The film made $76,817 in its opening weekend in five US theaters. It had a worldwide gross of $5,914,908, of which $1,308,696 were in the US, against a $32 million budget.

=== Critical response ===
The Good German received generally mixed reviews, with many critics complaining that it was too reliant on style and did not concentrate on the building of characters. As of June 2020, the film holds a 34% approval rating on Rotten Tomatoes, based on 153 reviews with an average rating of 5.04/10. The site's consensus states: "Though Steven Soderbergh succeeds in emulating the glossy look of 1940s noirs, The Good German ultimately ends up as a self-conscious exercise in style that forgets to develop compelling characters." On Metacritic, the film has an average score of 49 out of 100 based on 34 reviews, indicating "mixed or average reviews".

Peter Travers of Rolling Stone greatly appreciated the film, starting his review by saying, "OK, it’s more of an experiment than a movie. But why deny the magic?" and ending it with, "No true student of cinema will want to miss his ride back to the future. It’s pure moviegoing bliss." Todd McCarthy of Variety felt it came up short and said it had "little of the luster, sheen, and pictorial nuance of a top-flight Hollywood picture of the old school." He felt the film "looks less like a 1942 Warner Bros. melodrama than a 1962 Twilight Zone episode intercut with background shots from Rossellini's Germany Year Zero".

=== Accolades ===
The film was nominated for the Berlin International Film Festival Golden Bear and received an Academy Award nomination for Best Original Score.
