= Joseph Kanon =

American author

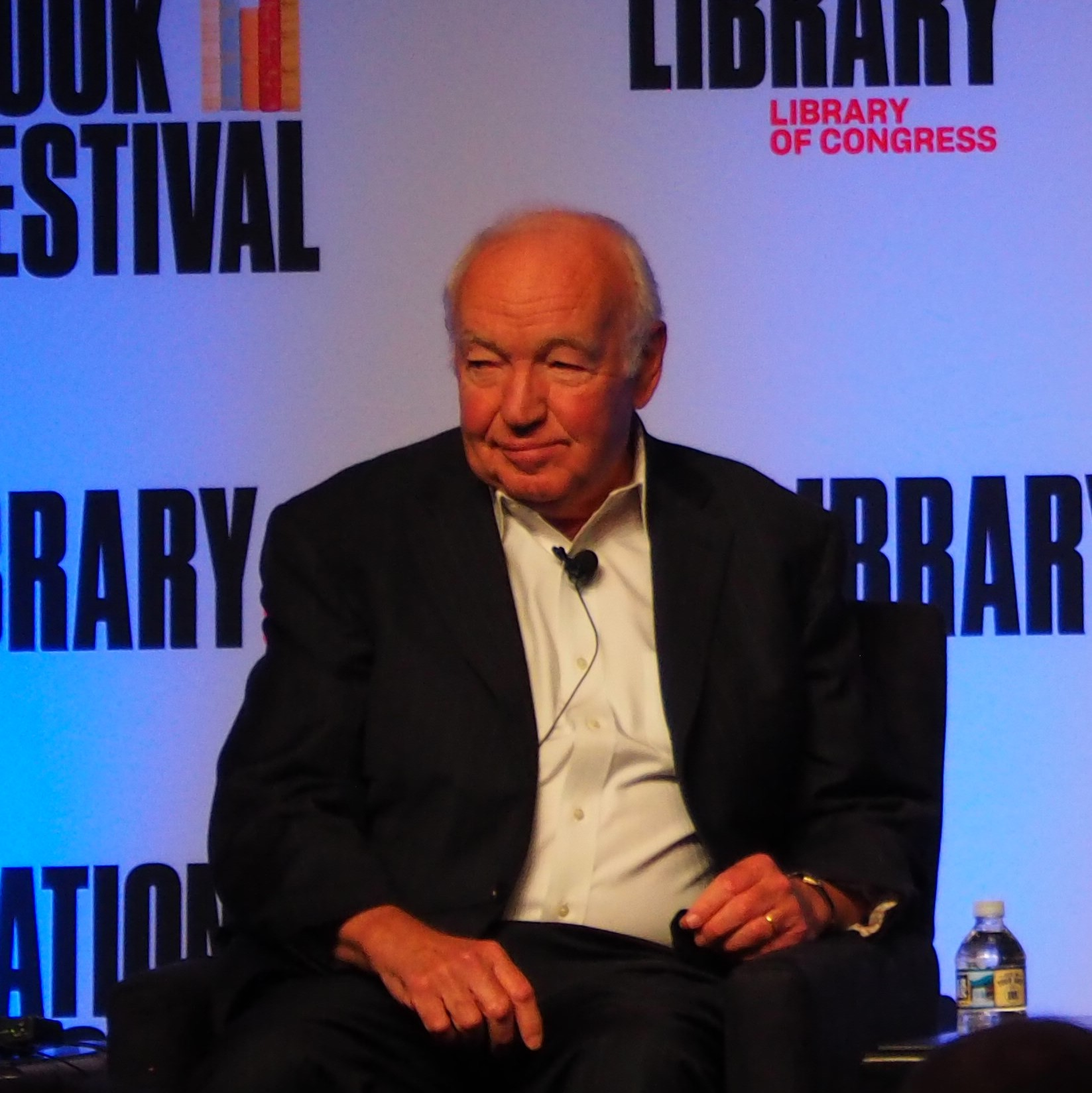
- Born: 1946 (age 79–80); Pennsylvania, U.S.
- Education: Harvard University, Trinity College
- Occupation: Novelist
- Known for: Author of spy novels
- Spouse: Robin Straus

Joseph Kanon (born 1946) is an American author, best known for thriller and spy novels set in the period immediately after World War II.

== Early life ==
In 1946, Kanon was born in Pennsylvania, U.S.

== Education ==
Kanon studied at Harvard University, and at Trinity College in Cambridge. As an undergraduate, he published his first stories in The Atlantic Monthly.

== Career ==
Kanon was the editor in chief, CEO, and president of the publishing houses Houghton Mifflin and E. P. Dutton in New York.

Kanon began his writing career in 1995. His first novel, Los Alamos (1997), became a bestseller and received the Edgar Award for Best First Novel in 1998. Further novels followed, including The Prodigal Spy, The Good German and Alibi. His stories are set in the period between World War II and 1950, and he has often used a real event, such as the Potsdam Conference or the Manhattan Project, as the background for a murder case. His novels are critically acclaimed, and reviewers from the Boston Globe and The New York Times have compared his work with the novels of Graham Greene and John le Carré. A film based on The Good German was produced in 2006, directed by Steven Soderbergh and starring George Clooney and Cate Blanchett. Istanbul Passage is a spy thriller set in that city in 1945. Leaving Berlin (2015) concerns an American expatriate who becomes an unwilling double agent of the American and East German intelligence services during the Berlin Airlift of 1948-1949.

== Personal life ==
Kanon is married to Robin Straus, a literary agent. They reside in New York City, New York.

== Works ==
- Los Alamos (1997)
- The Prodigal Spy (1998)
- The Good German (2001); (not to be confused with the 2020 novel by Dennis Bock)
- Alibi (2005)
- Stardust (2009)
- Istanbul Passage (2012)
- Leaving Berlin (2014)
- Defectors (2017)
- The Accomplice (2019)
- The Berlin Exchange (2022)
- Shanghai (2024)
