= Adebayo Ogunlesi =

Nigerian lawyer and investment banker (born 1953)

Adebayo Ogunlesi CON
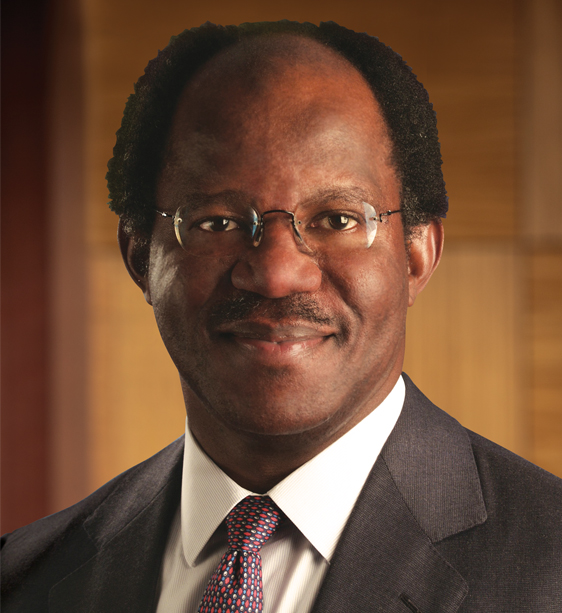
- Born: 20 December 1953 (age 72); Ibadan, Southern Region, British Nigeria (now in Oyo State, Nigeria)
- Education: Lincoln College, Oxford; Harvard Law School; Harvard Business School
- Alma mater: King's College, Lagos
- Occupation: Investment banker
- Years active: 1980–present
- Title: Co-founder Global Infrastructure Partners
- Board member of: BlackRock
- Spouse: Amelia Quist-Ogunlesi (m. 1985)
- Children: 2, including Geoffrey
- Parent(s): Oladipo Ogunlesi; Susan Olorunfemi Peters

Adebayo "Bayo" O. Ogunlesi (born 20 December 1953) is a Nigerian lawyer and investment banker. He is chairman and managing partner at the private equity firm Global Infrastructure Partners (GIP). Ogunlesi was the former head of global investment banking at Credit Suisse First Boston before being promoted to chief client officer and executive vice chairman.

== Early life and education ==
Ogunlesi was born and raised in Ibadan, Oyo State. His parents are from Makun, Sagamu, Ogun State, Nigeria. He is the son of Susan Olorunfemi Peters and Theophilus O. Ogunlesi, the first Nigerian professor of medicine at University of Ibadan. His family is of Yoruba origin.

Ogunlesi went to King's College, Lagos, a secondary school in Lagos, Nigeria. He received a B.A. with first class honors in philosophy, politics and economics from Oxford University in England. In 1979, Ogunlesi received a JD–MBA from Harvard Law School and later Harvard Business School. During his time at Harvard, he was on the Harvard Law Review.

== Career ==
From 1980 to 1981, Ogunlesi served as a law clerk to associate justice Thurgood Marshall of the United States Supreme Court. Ogunlesi was an attorney in the corporate practice group of the New York City law firm of Cravath, Swaine & Moore, where he had been a summer associate while studying for his M.B.A.

In 1983, Ogunlesi joined the investment bank First Boston as an advisor on a Nigerian gas project. At First Boston, he worked in the Project Finance Group, advising clients on transactions and financings and has worked on transactions in North and South America, the Caribbean, Europe, the Middle East, Africa and Asia. From 1997 to 2002, he was the Head of the Global Energy Group of the by then renamed Credit Suisse First Boston (CSFB). In 2002, Ogunlesi was appointed Global Head of CSFB's Investment Banking Division. Also in 2002, he served as a member of Credit Suisse's executive board and Management Committee. From 2004 to 2006, Ogunlesi was Executive Vice Chairman and Chief Client Officer of CSFB.

In July 2006, Ogunlesi started the private equity firm Global Infrastructure Partners (GIP), a joint venture whose initial investors included Credit Suisse and General Electric. He currently serves as chairman and managing partner.

In 2006, GIP bought London City Airport. In 2009, GIP acquired a majority stake in London Gatwick Airport in a deal worth £1.455 billion. The Nigerian press has given him the nickname, "The Man Who Bought Gatwick Airport." GIP also owns Edinburgh Airport, which they bought in 2012, and Nuovo Trasporto Viaggiatori, which they bought in February 2018.

In January 2024, BlackRock agreed to buy GIP for about $12.5 billion. BlackRock will pay $3 billion in cash and 12 million of its own shares as part of the deal to buy GIP. The 400 people directly employed by GIP will receive some of the stock, and five of the six founding partners, including chief executive Ogunlesi, will join BlackRock as part of the deal.

In May 2026, speaking as Chairman and CEO of Global Infrastructure Partners during the BlackRock South Africa Infrastructure Investment Summit in Cape Town, Ogunlesi announced plans to expand BlackRock's infrastructure investment footprint in South Africa. He stated that the firm aimed to grow its $28–$30 billion (R500 billion) South Africa-linked assets under management over the following five years, identifying critical investment opportunities in energy, transport, digital infrastructure, and logistics.

== Additional work ==
Ogunlesi is a member of the District of Columbia Bar Association. While working at Credit Suisse First Boston, he was a lecturer at Harvard Law School and the Yale School of Management, where he taught a course on transnational investment projects in emerging countries.

In October 2012, he was appointed to the board of directors at Goldman Sachs. On 24 July 2014, he was named lead director.

In December 2016, it was announced that Ogunlesi, among other business leaders, would be part of Donald Trump's Strategic and Policy Forum, which was disbanded on 16 August 2017.

In 2022, Ogunlesi was named to the President's National Infrastructure Advisory Council.

In January 2025, Ogunlesi joined the board of directors of OpenAI.

== Personal life ==
Ogunlesi has been married to British-born optometrist Dr. Amelia Quist-Ogunlesi since 1985. They have two children. In his song "Wonderful," Burna Boy pays tribute to Adebayo, citing his hard work. As of 2025, Forbes estimates his net worth at US$2.5 billion.

== Awards and honors ==
Recipient of The International Center in New York's Award of Excellence. Ogunlesi was cited as one of the Top 100 most influential Africans by New African magazine in 2019.

== Works and publications ==
- Ogunlesi, Adebayo (1979). The Basic Human Needs Approach to Development. Cambridge, MA: Harvard Law School. OCLC 81062298. Submitted to: Professor C. Clyde Ferguson Jr. [for the] Seminar: Legal Problems of the New International Economics Order (Harvard third year paper)

== See also ==
- List of law clerks for the tenth seat of the Supreme Court of the United States
