= University College Hospital, Ibadan =

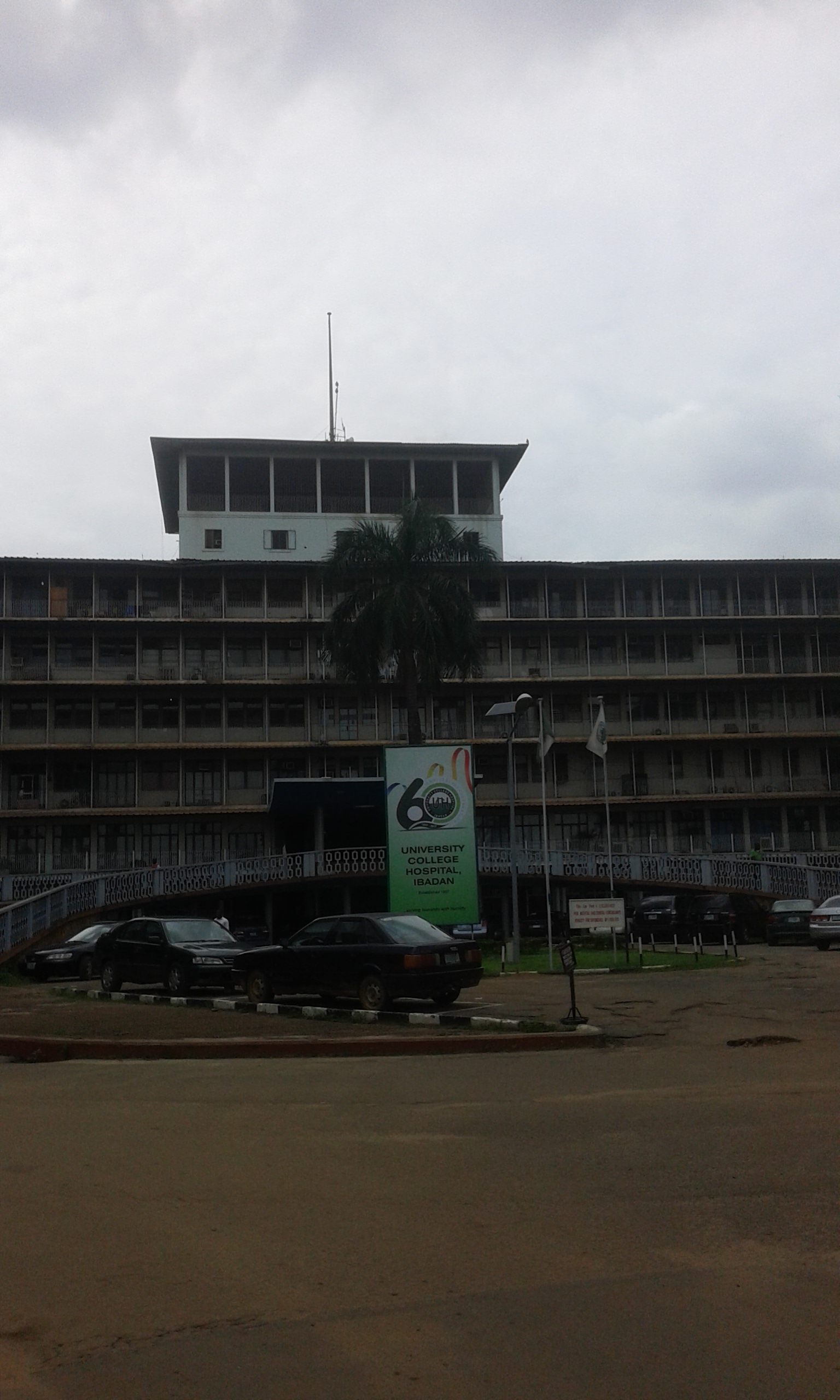
- University College Hospital

Geography
- Location: Ibadan, Oyo State, Nigeria
- Coordinates: 7.402053°N 3.902249°E

Organisation
- Type: Teaching
- Affiliated university: University of Ibadan

Services
- Emergency department: Yes
- Beds: 1,445
- Speciality: Research, teaching hospital

Helipads
- Helipad: University College Hospital Ibadan(First teaching hospital in Nigeria)2.jpg

History
- Founded: 20 November 1957; 68 years ago

Links
- Website: www.uch-ibadan.org.ng
- Lists: Hospitals in Nigeria

University College Hospital, Ibadan (UCH) is a Federal teaching Hospital in Ibadan, Nigeria affiliated with the University of Ibadan.

== History ==
The University College Hospital (UCH), Ibadan was established in August 1952 by an Act of Parliament in response to the need for the training of medical personnel and other healthcare professionals for Nigeria and the West African sub-region. The establishment of the hospital followed a followed a Visitation Panel in 1951, which assessed the clinical facilities for the clinical postings of medical students registered for an M.B.B.S. degree at the University of London. The Visitation Panel, led by Dr. T.F. Hunt of the University of London, rejected the enhanced facilities provided by the Government/Native Authority Hospital at Adeoyo, Ibadan, following the establishment of a Faculty of Medicine at University College, Ibadan (now the University of Ibadan) in 1948.

The University College Hospital was strategically located in Ibadan, then the largest city in West Africa, which was also the seat of the first university in Nigeria. The physical development of the Hospital commenced in 1953 at its present site, and it was formally commissioned after completion on 20 November 1957. The hospital was initially commissioned with 500 bed spaces. It currently has 1,000 bed spaces and 200 examination couches, with occupancy rates ranging from 65% to 70%.

At its inception in 1957, the hospital had two clinical departments: Medicine and Surgery. It has since evolved to accommodate about 65 departments, among which is the first Department of Nuclear Medicine in Nigeria, commissioned by the former Honourable Minister of Health, Professor Eyitayo Lambo, on 27 April 2006. The hospital and the University of Ibadan function in close symbiosis in the areas of health workforce training, research and clinical service. This functional interdependence was emphasized from inception through the appointment of the Chairman of the Provisional Council of the University College, (now the University of Ibadan) as the first chairman of the Board of Management of the University College Hospital, Ibadan.

In addition to the undergraduate medical programme (based at the College of Medicine of the University of Ibadan), the UCH also provides for: Postgraduate Residency Training Programmes in all specialities of Internal Medicine, Surgery, Obstetrics and Gynecology, Pediatrics, Otorhinolaryngology, Ophthalmology, Anesthesia, Emergency Medicine, Orthopaedic Surgery and Traumatology, Laboratory Medicine, Psychiatry, Community Medicine, Family Medicine, Radiology, Radiation Oncology, Neurological Surgery and Dentistry. The University College Hospital also provides diploma/professional programmes in the School of Health Records & Statistics, Environmental Health Officers Tutors Course; Primary Health Tutors Course, Nurse/Midwife/Public Health Nurse, Nurse Tutors Course, Post-Registration Courses in nursing e.g. Perioperative Nursing and Occupational Health Nursing.

The hospital is primarily a tertiary institution with appendages of community-based outreach activities at Igbo Ora, Abedo, Okuku, Sepeteri, Elesu, and Jago where it offers primary and secondary health care services. The hospital has about 65 service and clinical departments and runs 96 consultative out-patient clinics a week in 50 speciality and sub-speciality disciplines. In addition to the College of Medicine, the Hospital houses a Virology Research laboratory, a W.H.O Collaborating Centre in Immunology and an Institute of Advanced Medical Research and Training (IAMRAT). The hospital also houses the Special Treatment Clinic (STC), a clinic for research, training, and treatment of Sexually Transmitted Diseases and runs clinics for people living with HIV/AIDS. Accreditation has been given for the setting up of a department of nuclear medicine while approval has also been given by the Federal Ministry of Health for the establishment of an Institute of Neurosciences. Satellite pharmacies are provided on each specialty floor for easy access for the procurement of drugs for patients on admission. A Pain Clinic and a Hospice Service are also on site for the care of terminally ill patients. The hospital also houses the first and only Geriatric Centre in sub-Saharan Africa, the Chief Tony Anenih Geriatric Centre (CTAGC).

Since its inception, the hospital has trained over 6,000 doctors, 501 dentists, 4,513 nurses, 2307 midwives, 471 perioperative nurses, 1,062 laboratory scientists, 576 environmental health officers tutors, 451 nurses/midwives/public health educators, 326 primary health care tutors, 590 community health officers, 640 physiotherapists, 551 health information management personnel (formerly referred to as medical records officers). As a result of the breakdown of primary healthcare facilities in the region, the hospital, though a tertiary healthcare facility, still caters for a lot of the primary and secondary healthcare burden. The patients' turnout in the Emergency Department of the Hospital averages 6,500 annually and about 150,000 new patients are seen in the various out-patient clinics every year. In 2001, the million clientele mark was attained.

The management of the hospital, spurred by the Federal Government's efforts in refurbishing the teaching hospital, has taken steps to widen the scope of services provided by the revival of the hospital's open heart surgical procedure. In May 2006, a surgical team successfully performed open-heart surgery on three paediatric patients, an important landmark in medicine in Nigeria. Further, the hospital has performed 38 more open-heart surgeries on patients with acquired and congenital heart diseases since then with a 100% success rate.

== Schools ==
- Health Information Management
- Medical Laboratory Science
- School of Nursing and Midwifery
- Occupational Health Nursing
- Perioperative Nursing
- Federally Funded Schools
- School of Community Health

== Chief Medical Directors ==
The Chief Medical Directors of the University College Hospital since its founding are as follows:

- Professor Ebenezer Oluwole Akande
- Professor Abiodun O.K. Johnson
- Professor Benjamin O. Osuntokun
- Professor Olajide Ajayi
- Professor Michael O. Olatawura
- Professor Abiodun Ilesanmi 2003–2011
- Professor Temitope O. Alonge 2011–2019
- Professor Jesse Abiodun Otegbayo 2019–present

== Controversy ==
The hospital management was accused of covering up a 2019 rape incident involving a medical student and a resident doctor, despite the availability of forensic evidence.

Rape is a criminal offense and can only be prosecuted in a court of competent jurisdiction. The University College Hospital conducted an investigation, led by the current Provost of the College of Medicine, University of Ibadan. The Provost, a woman,concluded in her report that the "victim" culpable. The report was forwarded to the Vice-Chancellor of the University of Ibadan, where the "victim" is a student and to whom she initially reported the incident. A copy of the report was also given to her lawyer. She was advised to file a criminal charge against the suspect, but she has not done so to date.The University College Hospital has no authority try cases of rape or any criminal charge, for that matter. It is also important to note that the doctor in question has since left the service of the University College Hospital. Instead of the social media war, the victim is advised to approach a court for justice.

In February 2025, University of Ibadan Students protest prolonged days of blackout in the Hospital

== Departments ==
- Clinical Departments
- Non-Clinical Departments
- Education Departments
- Laboratory Medicine & Science Departments
- Dentistry Departments
- Medical & Social Service Departments
- Clinical Research & Training Departments
- Private Suites Departments

== See also ==
- Kofoworola Abeni Pratt, the hospital's first Nigerian Matron

== Photo gallery ==
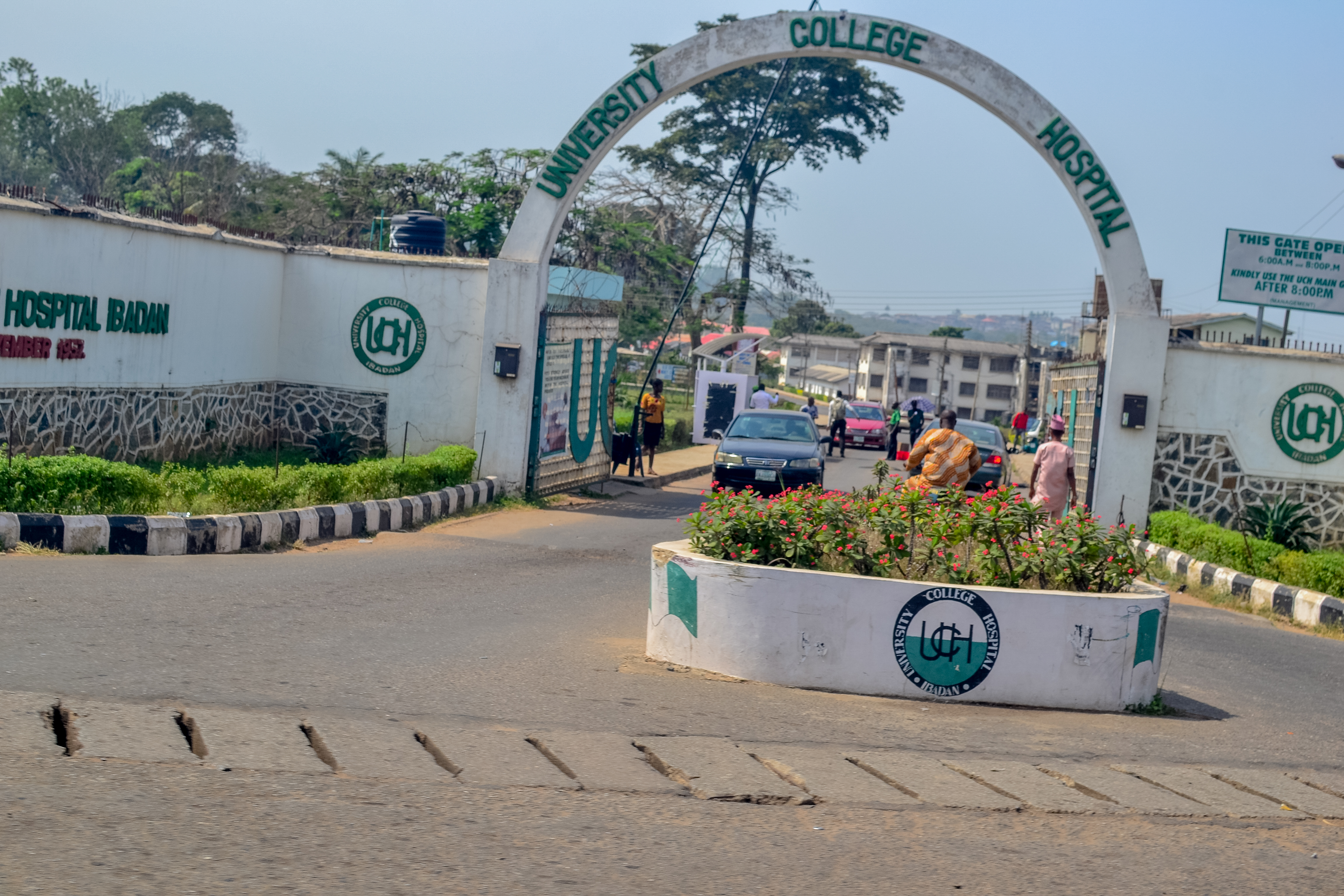

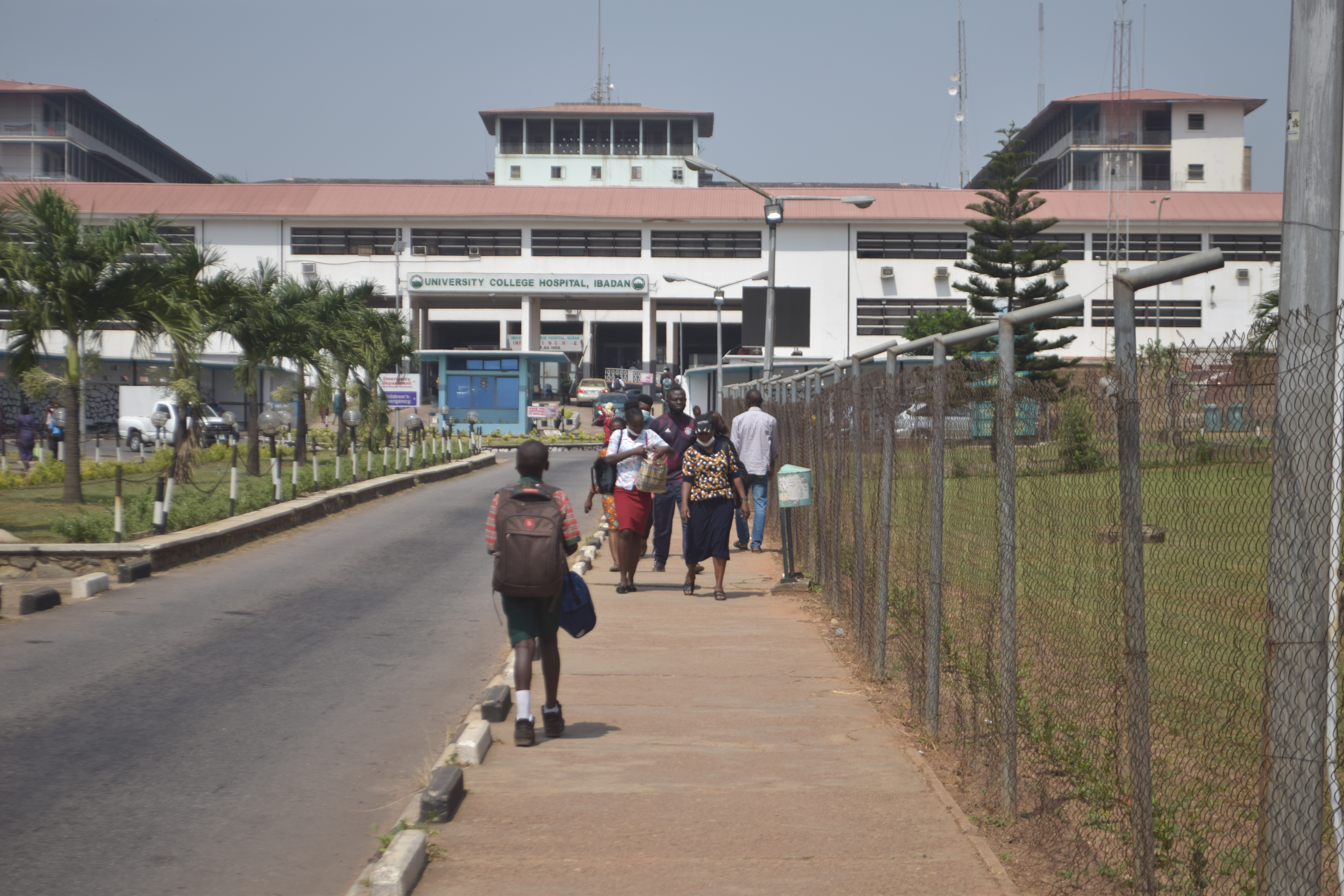

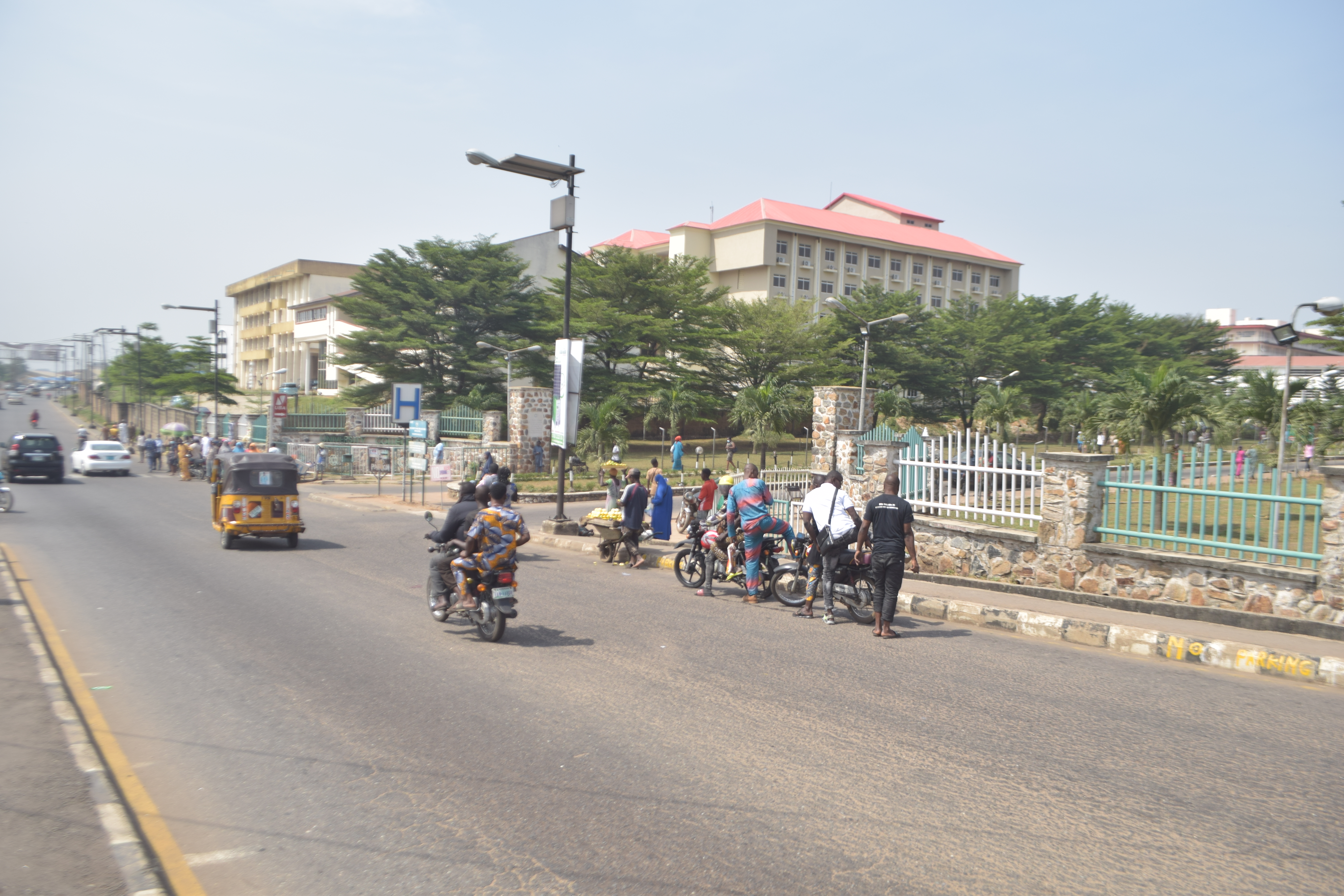

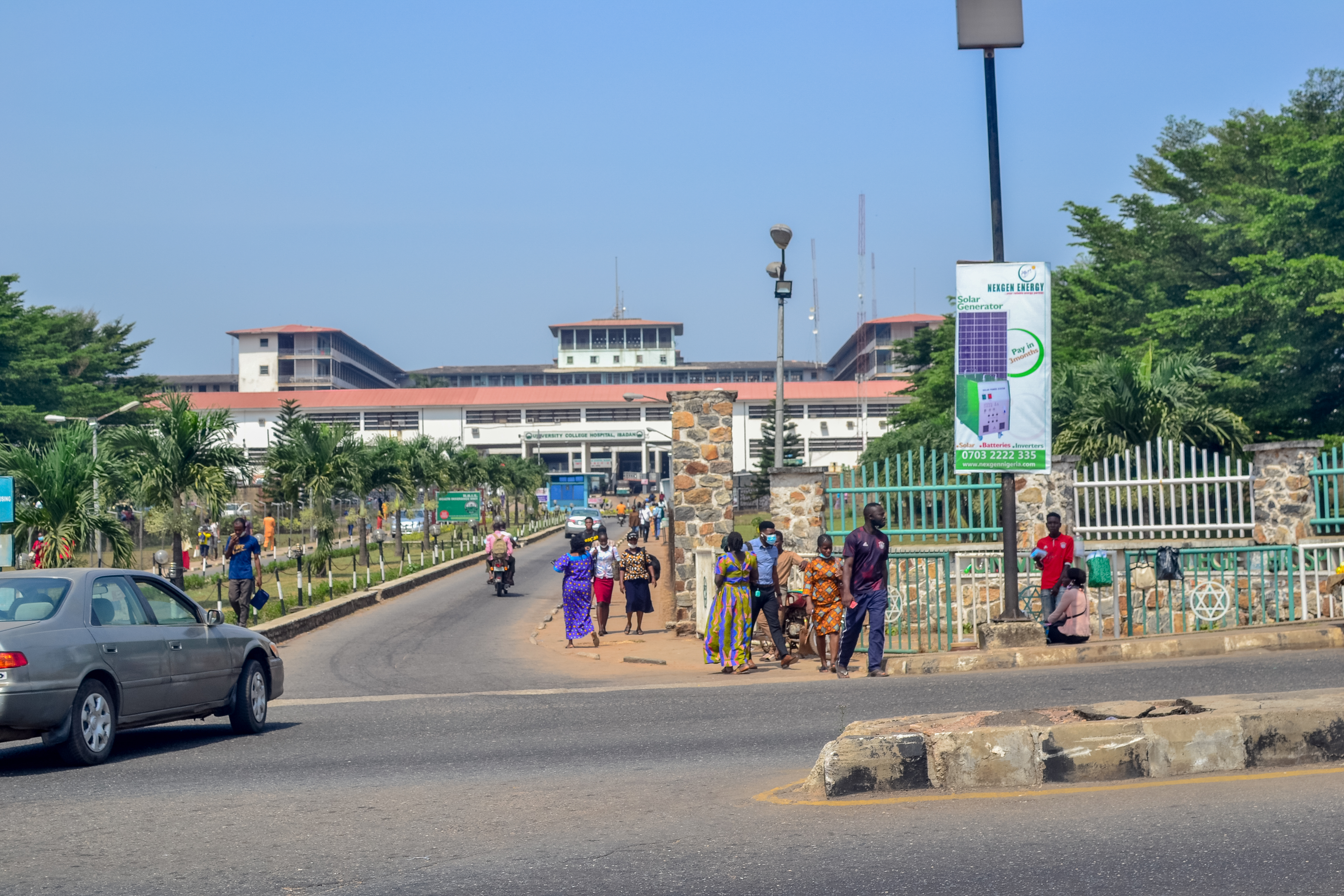

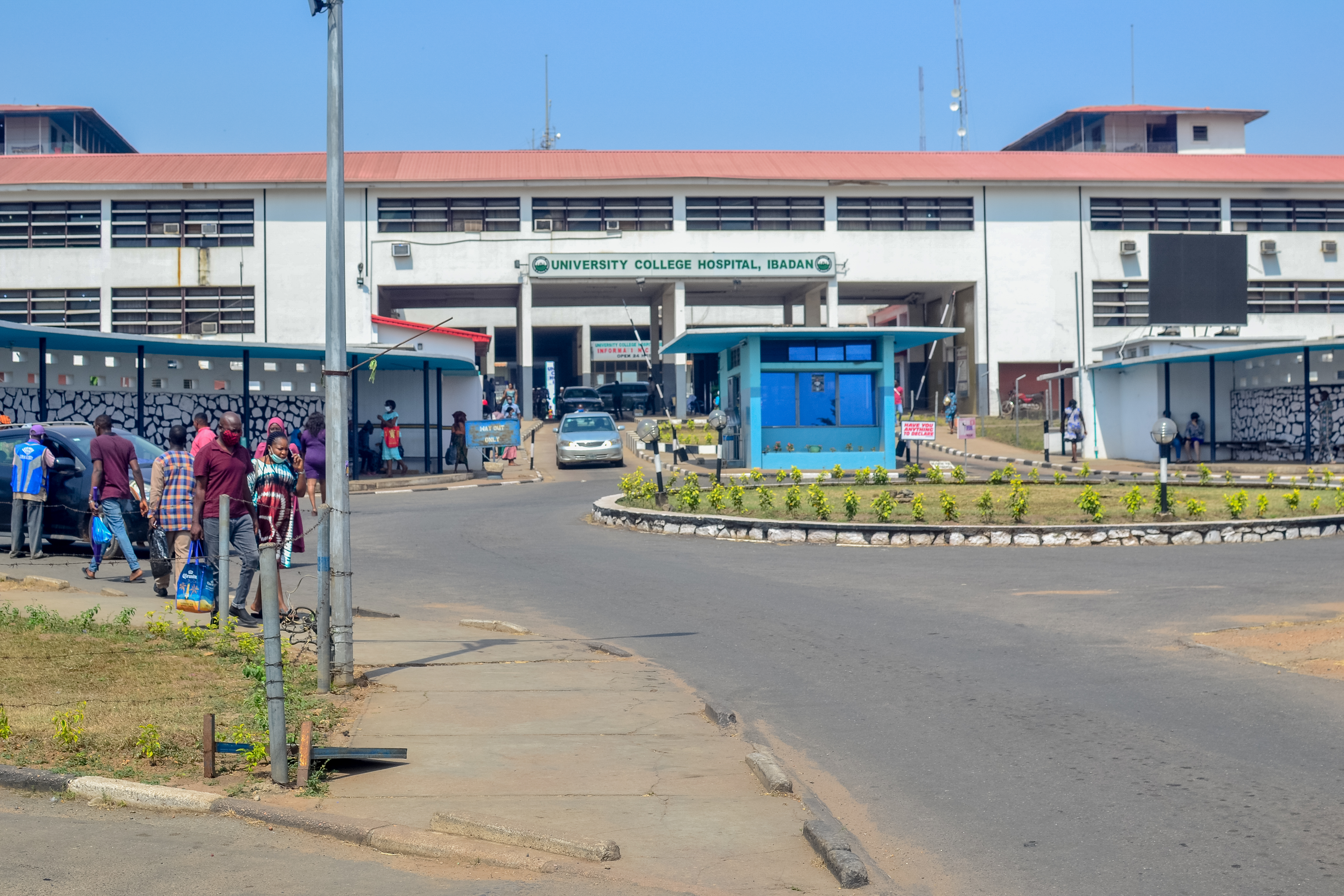

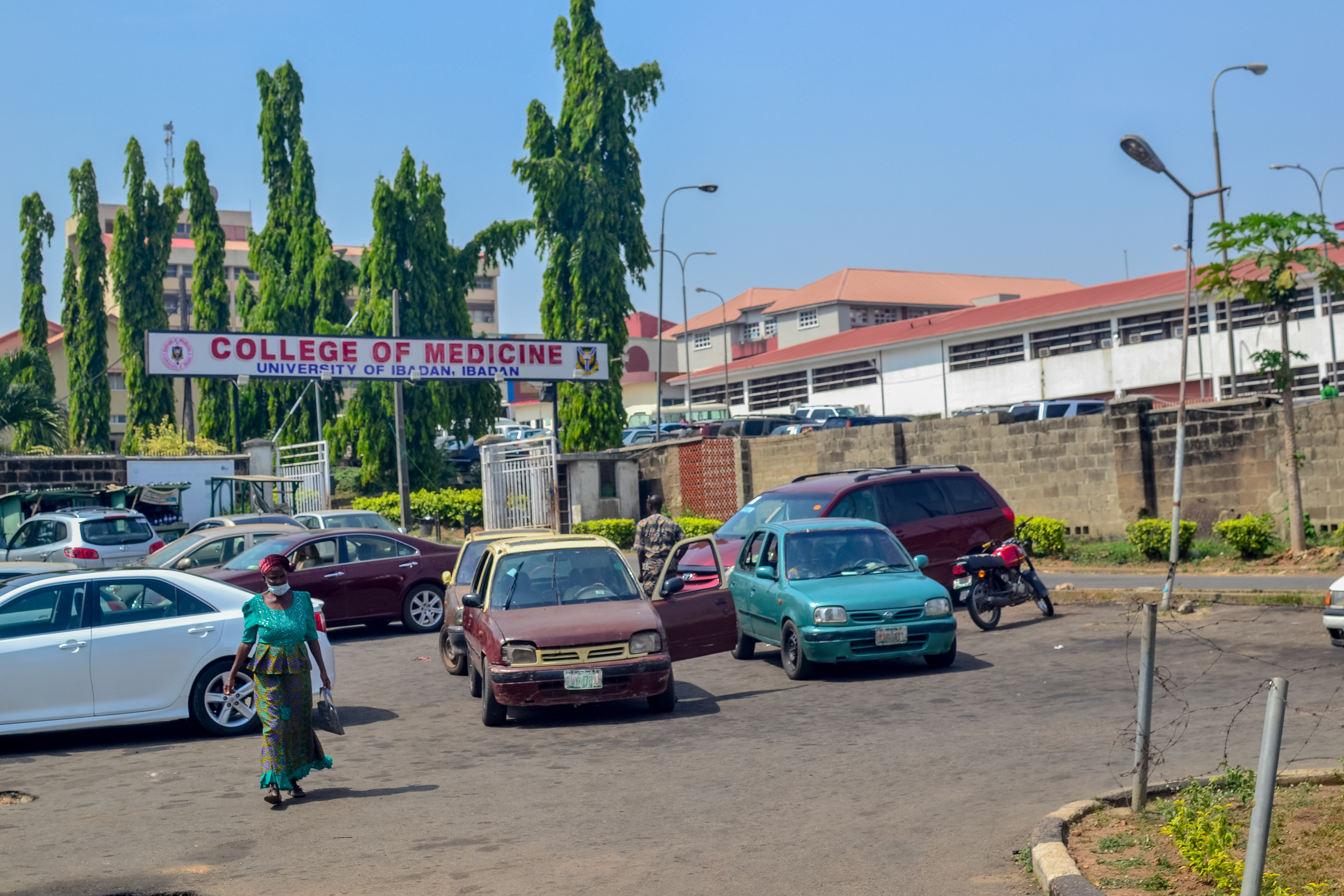
