= Olajumoke Aiki =

Nigerian jurist

Hon. Justice Olajumoke Olusola Aiki

Judge of the High Court of Oyo State
- In office July 2006 – 25 July 2022
- Appointed by: Rashidi Ladoja

Personal details
- Born: July 25, 1957 Afijio, Oyo State, Nigeria
- Education: Obafemi Awolowo University (LL.B)
- Occupation: Jurist

Olajumoke Olusola Aiki (born 25 July 1957) is a Nigerian jurist and former judge of the High Court of Oyo State. She served on the bench from 2006 until her retirement in 2022. She currently serves as Chairperson of the Oyo State Real Properties Protection Law Agency Task Force (also known as the Anti-Land Grabbing Agency).

== Early life and education ==
Aiki was born on 25 July 1957 and is from Afijio Local Government Area of Oyo State. She attended Awe High School, Awe, and Kiriji Memorial College, Igbajo, for secondary education. She holds an Ordinary National Diploma (OND) in Secretarial Studies from The Polytechnic, Ibadan, and a Bachelor of Laws (LL.B) degree from the University of Ife. She attended the Nigerian Law School and was called to the Nigerian Bar in 1988.

== Career ==
Aiki joined the Oyo State Judiciary and held several administrative positions before her elevation to the bench. She served as Deputy Chief Registrar (DCR) Grade II/Director from 2001 to 2005 and as Deputy Chief Registrar Grade I from 2005 to 2006. In 2006, she was appointed Chief Registrar of the High Court of Oyo State.

In July 2006, she was elevated to the position of Judge of the High Court of Oyo State.

=== Retirement ===
Aiki retired from the bench on 25 July 2022 upon reaching the mandatory retirement age of 65.

After retiring, Aiki was appointed by Governor Seyi Makinde as Chairperson of the Oyo State Real Properties Protection Law Agency Task Force (commonly referred to as the Anti-Land Grabbing Agency).
