= 2019 Oyo State House of Assembly election =

- March 9, 2019

All 32 seats in the Oyo State House of Assembly 17 seats needed for a majority
	Majority party
Leader	Debo Ogundoyin
Party	PDP
Leader's seat	Ibarapa East
Last election	32
Seats after	32
Seat change	Steady
Speaker before election
Michael Adeyemo
APC
Elected Speaker
Debo Ogundoyin
PDP

The 2019 Oyo State House of Assembly election was held on March 9, 2019, to elect members of the Oyo State House of Assembly in Nigeria. All the 32 seats were up for election in the Oyo State House of Assembly. PDP won 26 seats, APC won 5 seats, while ADP won 1 seat.

Upon the opening of the 9th State House of Assembly, Debo Ogundoyin (PDP-Ibarapa East) was elected as Speaker of the House while Abiodun Mohammed Fadeyi (PDP-Ona Ara) and Adedoyin Onaolapo Sanjo (PDP-Ogbomoso South) became Deputy Speaker and House Leader, respectively.

== Results ==
=== Ibarapa East ===
PDP candidate Debo Ogundoyin won the election.

2019 Oyo State House of Assembly election
Party	Candidate	Votes	%
PDP	Debo Ogundoyin		
PDP hold			

=== Ibadan North I ===
PDP candidate Oyekunle Fola won the election.

2019 Oyo State House of Assembly election
Party	Candidate	Votes	%
PDP	Oyekunle Fola		
PDP hold			

=== Ona Ara ===
PDP candidate Abiodun Mohammed Fadeyi won the election.

2019 Oyo State House of Assembly election
Party	Candidate	Votes	%
PDP	Abiodun Mohammed Fadeyi		
PDP hold			

=== Oluyole ===
PDP candidate Francis Adetunji won the election.

2019 Oyo State House of Assembly election
Party	Candidate	Votes	%
PDP	Francis Adetunji		
PDP hold			

=== Ibadan South West II ===
PDP candidate Oluwafemi Fowokannu won the election.

2019 Oyo State House of Assembly election
Party	Candidate	Votes	%
PDP	Oluwafemi Fowokannu		
PDP hold			

=== Ido ===
PDP candidate Mobaje Razak won the election.

2019 Oyo State House of Assembly election
Party	Candidate	Votes	%
PDP	Mobaje Razak		
PDP hold			

=== Ibadan North West ===
PDP candidate Akeem Obadara won the election.

2019 Oyo State House of Assembly election
Party	Candidate	Votes	%
PDP	Akeem Obadara		
PDP hold			

=== Akinyele I ===
PDP candidate Fatokun Ayotunde won the election.

2019 Oyo State House of Assembly election
Party	Candidate	Votes	%
PDP	Fatokun Ayotunde		
PDP hold			

=== Saki East/Atisbo ===
PDP candidate Saminu Riliwan Gbadamosi won the election.

2019 Oyo State House of Assembly election
Party	Candidate	Votes	%
PDP	Saminu Riliwan Gbadamosi		
PDP hold			

=== Ibarapa North/Central ===
PDP candidate Ojedokun Peter Gbadegesin won the election.

2019 Oyo State House of Assembly election
Party	Candidate	Votes	%
PDP	Ojedokun Peter Gbadegesin		
PDP hold			

=== Egbeda ===
PDP candidate Babalola Olasunkanmi Samson won the election.

2019 Oyo State House of Assembly election
Party	Candidate	Votes	%
PDP	Babalola Olasunkanmi Samson		
PDP hold			

=== Irepo/Olorunsogo ===
PDP candidate Fatokun Ayotunde Olajide won the election.

2019 Oyo State House of Assembly election
Party	Candidate	Votes	%
PDP	Fatokun Ayotunde Olajide		
PDP hold			

=== Ibadan North East I ===
PDP candidate Olagoke Olamide Francis won the election.

2019 Oyo State House of Assembly election
Party	Candidate	Votes	%
PDP	Olagoke Olamide Francis		
PDP hold			

=== Ibadan North East II ===
PDP candidate Owolabi Olusola Adewale won the election.

2019 Oyo State House of Assembly election
Party	Candidate	Votes	%
PDP	Owolabi Olusola Adewale		
PDP hold			

=== Ibadan South East II ===
PDP candidate Popoola Ademola Olusegun won the election.

2019 Oyo State House of Assembly election
Party	Candidate	Votes	%
PDP	Popoola Ademola Olusegun		
PDP hold			

=== Kajola ===
PDP candidate Mustapha Akeem Olawale won the election.

2019 Oyo State House of Assembly election
Party	Candidate	Votes	%
PDP	Mustapha Akeem Olawale		
PDP hold			

=== Iseyin/Itesiwaju ===
PDP candidate Adeola Bamidele won the election.

2019 Oyo State House of Assembly election
Party	Candidate	Votes	%
PDP	Adeola Bamidele		
PDP hold			

=== Iwajowa ===
PDP candidate Adedibu Hakeem Adeshina won the election.

2019 Oyo State House of Assembly election
Party	Candidate	Votes	%
PDP	Adedibu Hakeem Adeshina		
PDP hold			

=== Ibadan South East I ===
PDP candidate Rasak Ademola Abdulahi won the election.

2019 Oyo State House of Assembly election
Party	Candidate	Votes	%
PDP	Rasak Ademola Abdulahi		
PDP hold			

=== Lagelu ===
PDP candidate Olajide Akintunde Emmanuel won the election.

2019 Oyo State House of Assembly election
Party	Candidate	Votes	%
PDP	Olajide Akintunde Emmanuel		
PDP hold			

=== Ogbomoso South ===
PDP candidate Onaolapo Sanjo won the election.

2019 Oyo State House of Assembly election
Party	Candidate	Votes	%
PDP	Onaolapo Sanjo		
PDP hold			

=== Orelope ===
PDP candidate Adewunmi Lateef Olayiwola won the election.

2019 Oyo State House of Assembly election
Party	Candidate	Votes	%
PDP	Adewunmi Lateef Olayiwola		
PDP hold			

=== Akinyele II ===
PDP candidate Kehinde Olatunde Taofik won the election.

2019 Oyo State House of Assembly election
Party	Candidate	Votes	%
PDP	Kehinde Olatunde Taofik		
PDP hold			

=== Ibadan North II ===
PDP candidate Adebayo Babajide Gabriel won the election.

2019 Oyo State House of Assembly election
Party	Candidate	Votes	%
PDP	Adebayo Babajide Gabriel		
PDP hold			

=== Saki West ===
PDP candidate Femi Julius Okeyoyin won the election.

2019 Oyo State House of Assembly election
Party	Candidate	Votes	%
PDP	Femi Julius Okeyoyin		
PDP hold			

=== Ibadan South West I ===
PDP candidate Yusuf Adebisi won the election.

2019 Oyo State House of Assembly election
Party	Candidate	Votes	%
PDP	Yusuf Adebisi		
PDP hold			

=== Afijio ===
APC candidate Seyi Adisa won the election.

2019 Oyo State House of Assembly election
Party	Candidate	Votes	%
APC	Seyi Adisa		
APC hold			

=== Oyo East/Oyo West ===
APC candidate Isiaka Kazeem Tunde won the election.

2019 Oyo State House of Assembly election
Party	Candidate	Votes	%
APC	Isiaka Kazeem Tunde		
APC hold			

=== Oriire ===
APC candidate Bamigboye Jacob Abidoye won the election.

2019 Oyo State House of Assembly election
Party	Candidate	Votes	%
APC	Bamigboye Jacob Abidoye		
APC hold			

=== Ogo-Oluwa/Surulere ===
APC candidate Oyeleke Simeon Adegbola won the election.

2019 Oyo State House of Assembly election
Party	Candidate	Votes	%
APC	Oyeleke Simeon Adegbola		
APC hold			

=== Atiba ===
APC candidate Alarape Ashimiyu Niran won the election.

2019 Oyo State House of Assembly election
Party	Candidate	Votes	%
APC	Alarape Ashimiyu Niran		
APC hold			

=== Ogbomoso North ===
ADP candidate Wunmi Oladeji won the election.

2019 Oyo State House of Assembly election
Party	Candidate	Votes	%
ADP	Wunmi Oladeji		
ADP hold			
