= Adelola =

Nigerian given name

- Gender: Male
- Language: Yoruba

Origin
- Origin: Nigeria
- Meaning: Royalty is wealthy..
- Region of origin: South West, Nigeria

Adelola audio is a Nigerian male given name and surname of Yoruba origin. It means "Royalty is wealthy".

== People ==
- Adelola Adeloye (1935–2021), Nigerian neurological surgeon and academic
- Rotimi Adelola (born 1958), Nigerian psychologist and film producer
