= Seyi Adisa =

Nigerian politician

- Born: 7 November 1983 (age 42)
- Other name: Joseph
- Education: University of Birmingham
- Occupation: Lawyer
- Political party: All Progressives Congress

Seyi Joseph Adisa (born 7 November 1983) is a Nigerian public administrator, speaker, lawyer, entrepreneur, and politician. He is a former Principal Private Secretary to the Executive Governor of Oyo State, Senator Abiola Ajimobi. He is the immediate past Honourable Member who represented Afijio state constituency of Oyo state in the 9th Oyo State House of Assembly. He is a member of the All Progressives Congress. Currently, he is the founder of the African Governance Institute for Development, a Pan African organisation set up to equip young aspiring leaders with the mindset and skillset required for public governance as well as educate citizens to participate in demanding good governance in order to hold leaders accountable across African nations.

== Early life and education ==
Seyi Adisa was born on 7 November 1983 in Lagos to Chief Ebenezer Babatunde Adisa and his wife. He began his early education at St. Leo's Nursery and Primary School, Ikeja, Lagos. He then proceeded to the prestigious King's College, Lagos, for his secondary school education. He underwent his A Level studies at Lambeth College where he studied law politics and business and finished with excellent grades. Seyi then proceeded to get a law degree from the University of Birmingham.

He is also a graduate of The BPP Law School where he obtained a distinction in his Legal Practice Course (LPC). Moving back home, he enrolled at the Nigerian Law School where graduated with second class upper. He furthered his professional development by self studying for the Institute of Chartered Secretary and Administrators Course and won the National Award for best student in Corporate Secretaryship. He is now a fellow of the institute. To complement his role as a public servant, Seyi Adisa secured a master's degree in Public Administration also from the University of Birmingham.

Furthermore, he has attended several trainings, prominent of which is the Harvard's Continuing Education Modules where he took the Fundamental of Strategy course.

== Career & experience ==
He is a founding partner of T&A Legal, a commercial law firm which he grew from 2 to 17 lawyers and 3 offices within 8 years. In charge of the commercial department, Seyi grew the clientele base to include not just start-ups but also blue-chip companies, multinationals and government agencies. Before starting T&A, he worked for the Adepetun Caxton-Martins Agbor & Segun firm, in the Energy (Oil & Gas) and Project Finance Department, where he was actively involved in several commercial transactions including Mergers & Acquisitions, drafting of several commercial agreements including Joint Venture Agreements, Oil Mining Leases and complex property agreements. Seyi is now in charge of the Regulatory and Public Policy department having had extensive experience working in government for 12 years.

== Personal life ==
Seyi Adisa is married to Tolu Adisa with whom he has a daughter. When he is not at work, he is an avid reader who loves leadership, nation building and entrepreneurship literature. He loves football, he is an Arsenal F.C. supporter and an English FA Level 1 coach.

== Politics ==
He was Vice President of the African-Caribbean Society at the University of Birmingham, and was the Principal Private Secretary to the Governor.

Seyi Adisa declared his interest to run as the House of Assembly representative for the Afijio state constituency, Oyo state, in early 2018. He secured his party ticket after a fiercely contested race with other candidates. At about 5:45 am on the morning of 10 March 2019, Seyi Adisa was declared honorable member-elect and returned winner of the state house of assembly race for Afijio LGA by the Independent National Electoral Commission (INEC). His brand of politics and unusual style of political campaign was seen as a breath of fresh air. His campaign tagline “EJEKASEYI”, translated as “Let's do this together.”
