= Gabriel Mojisola Babatunde =

Nigerian scholar

- Born: September 14, 1938; Akinmorin, Afijio
- Died: October 9, 2017 (aged 79)

Gabriel Mojisola Babatunde (September 14, 1938 – October 9, 2017) was born at Akinmorin, Afijio local government area of in Oyo state, Nigeria. He was the first Nigerian professor of animal science.

== Education and early life ==
Babatunde had his primary education at St. John School, Akinmorin between 1944 and 1950. He had his secondary Education at St. David School, Kudeti, Ibadan between 1951 and 1952. He proceeded in his secondary education by attending Government College Ibadan between 1952 and 1959. He had his B.Sc. (hons) Agric, second class upper division, (London), M.Sc; PhD (Animal Nutrition, Monogastrics) Cornell University, Ithaca, New York (1967). Also to his credit are postgraduate and diplomas and qualification, as an IAEA trainee on use of radioisotopes and radiation in Animal Science and Veterinary Medicine from Belgrade, Yugoslavia (1970).

== Fellowships and memberships ==
Babatunde was a Life Member and Fellow, Nigerian Society for Animal Production; Fellow, Animal Science Association of Nigeria; and Fellow, Nigerian Institute of Animal Science. He was also a member of American Registry of Professional Animal Scientists (ARPAS) since 1974. Likewise, he was a member of the American Society of Animal Science, Agricultural Society of Nigeria, Science Association of Nigeria, and the Nigerian Institute of Animal Science.

== Appointments ==
Babatunde worked as Lecturer II in the Animal Science Department, University of Ibadan between 1967 and 1969. He was promoted to Lecturer I in the same department and worked for the next 1 year. He worked as a Senior Lecturer/ Prof in the Animal Nutrition Department of the same school between 1972 and 1977. He was appointed Professor of Animal Nutrition (Monogastrics) in the Department of Animal Science, University of Ibadan in 1976/77 session. He is the first Editor-in-Chief of the Nigerian Journal of Animal Production. Between 1977 and 1980, he was the Head of Department, Animal Science University of Ibadan. He was the Dean, Faculty of Agriculture and Forestry (1980–1982). He was also the First Rector of the College of Agriculture and Natural Resources, Bendel State University between 1982 and 1984. He was the First Dean and Deputy Vice-Chancellor, University of Agriculture, Abeokuta.
