= Iyake Lake =

Lake in Oyo State, Nigeria

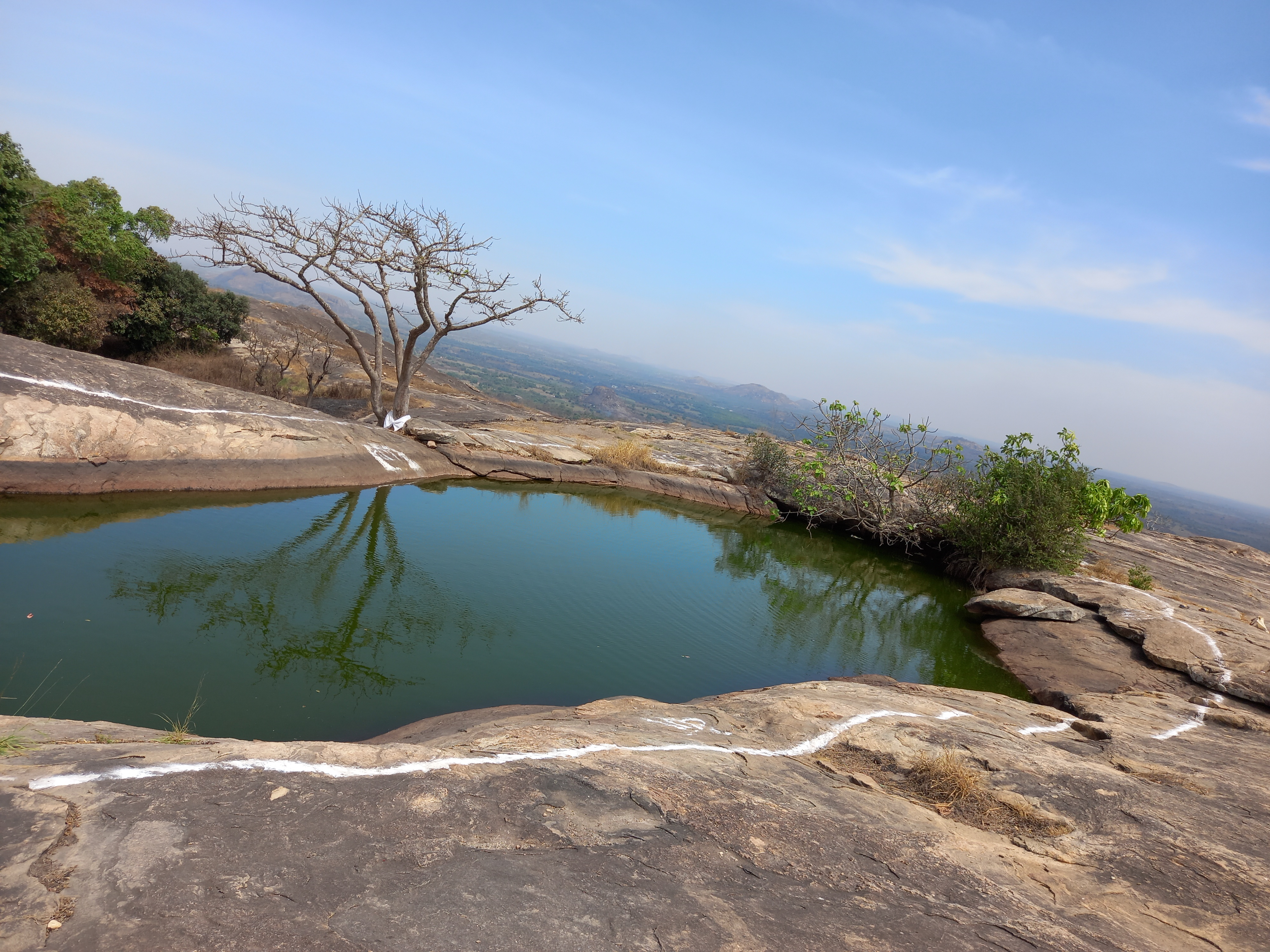
- View of Iyake Lake at Ado-Awaye, Oyo State
- Interactive map of Iyake Lake
- Location: Ado-Awaye, Oyo State, Nigeria
- Coordinates: 7.832°N 3.431°E
- Type: Suspended lake, Crater lake
- Basin countries: Nigeria
- Max. depth: Unknown
- Surface elevation: 91 m (300 ft)
- Settlements: Ado-Awaye

Iyake Lake is a small lake atop the Oke Ado Mountain in the town of Ado-Awaye, Oyo State, southwestern Nigeria. The Lake is often referred to by Nigerians as the "only suspended lake in Africa". It is said to be one of only two suspended lakes in the world, the other being the Hanging Lake in Colorado, USA.

The lake, fed by rain water runoff, is a naturally occurring body of water, approximately 350 m^{2} (3,800 sq ft) in surface area, that sits on a mountain approximately 300 m (980 ft) above sea level. It is oval-shaped and is filled with still, dark green water.

== History ==
According to local accounts, the name of the lake has its root in the Yoruba word Ìyáké, which translates to "woman’s cry", a reference to a tragic story historical event of a childless woman from Òtà in Ogun State, who moved to this place during the time of the Oyo Empire. According to local traditions, as she was ridiculed for her failure to give birth to any children, she ended up taking her own life by immersing herself in this lake, and her voice now resonates in that lake until today. It is believed in these stories that there are mystical qualities associated with this lake, which relate to the healing of barren women. Folklore surrounding the site also includes stories about Yoruba: Agbómofúnyàké, (Note: Translation (Collects child and gives to Iyake')) a nearby hole believed to possess supernatural qualities into which those who place a foot when filled with water are said never to return.

In the modern era, interest in Iyake Lake has increased beyond local and regional people with the advent of nature tourism in Nigeria. The initiatives taken by the Oyo State Government in developing the lake as a tourist site include the establishment of the Iyake International Festival, which took place for the first time in the 21st century and commemorates the lake as well as other cultural icons of Ado-Awaye. Political and developmental interventions in recent years have mainly emphasized the development of infrastructure to attract investment to the suspended lake and its surroundings.

== Geography ==
The lake is located in Ado-Awaye, a small town in the Iseyin Local Government Area of Oyo State. To reach it, visitors must hike up the Oke Ado Mountain, which also hosts other notable features like the Elephant tree, the Oke Ishage (a rock believed to bring rain), and Esè Àwon Àgbà (footprints believed to belong to ancient spirits).

== Cultural and spiritual significance ==
Iyake Lake is considered sacred by the local people, who believe it to be a spiritual portal to other realms. Traditional worshippers still hold annual rites at the lake, and swimming or entering the lake is discouraged due to its spiritual status and the danger posed by its unknown depth.

== Tourism ==
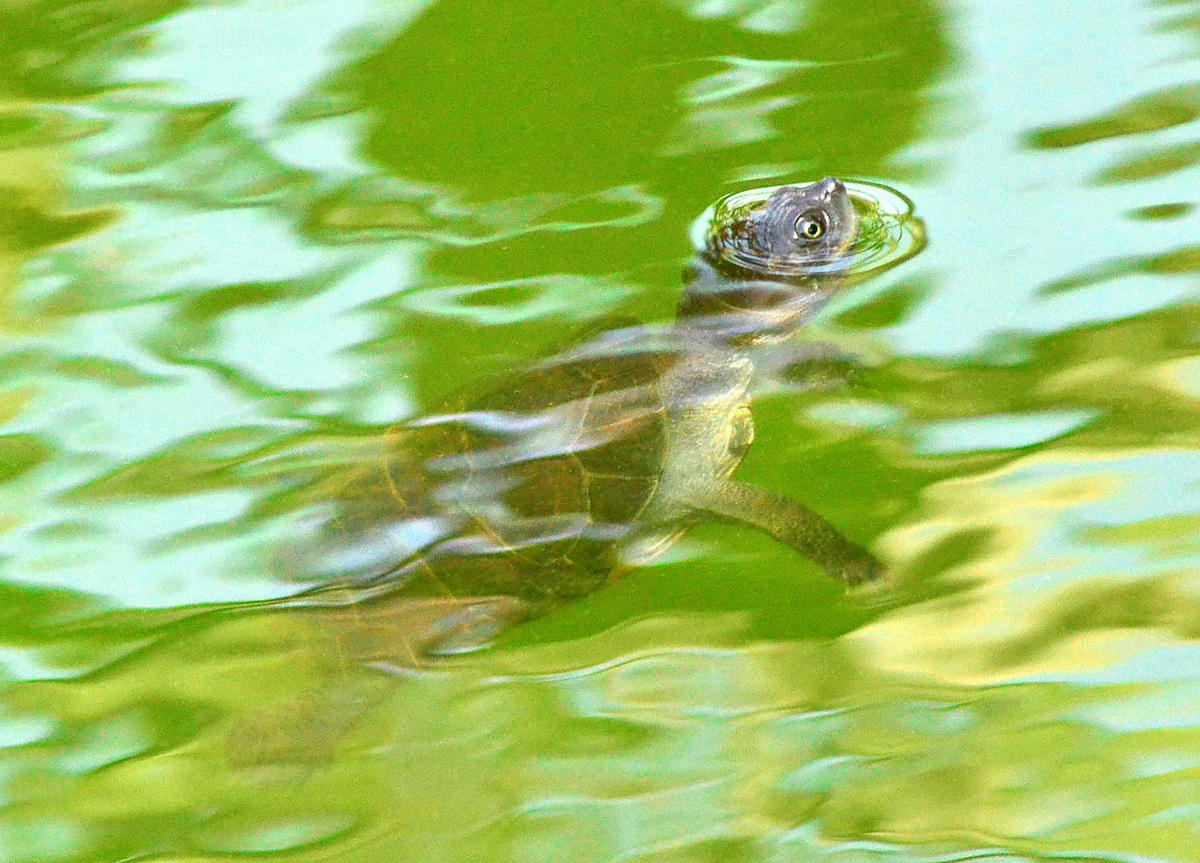
Mud turtle in Iyake suspended lake.

The lake has become a point of interest for tourists, researchers, and adventure seekers due to its widespread promotion through internet media. Despite limited infrastructure, efforts by local and state authorities are ongoing to develop the area into a more accessible tourist destination.

== See also ==
- Hanging Lake, Colorado
- List of lakes in Nigeria
