= Koladaisi University =

Private University

KolaDaisi University
- Motto: Knowledge for the Service of Humanity
- Type: Private
- Established: November 2016
- Chancellor: Chief Kola Daisi CON
- Vice-Chancellor: Prof. Adeniyi Olatunbosun
- Location: Ibadan, Oyo State, Nigeria; 7°37′31″N 3°54′39″E
- Colours: Green, Gold and Brown
- Website: www.koladaisiuniversity.edu.ng

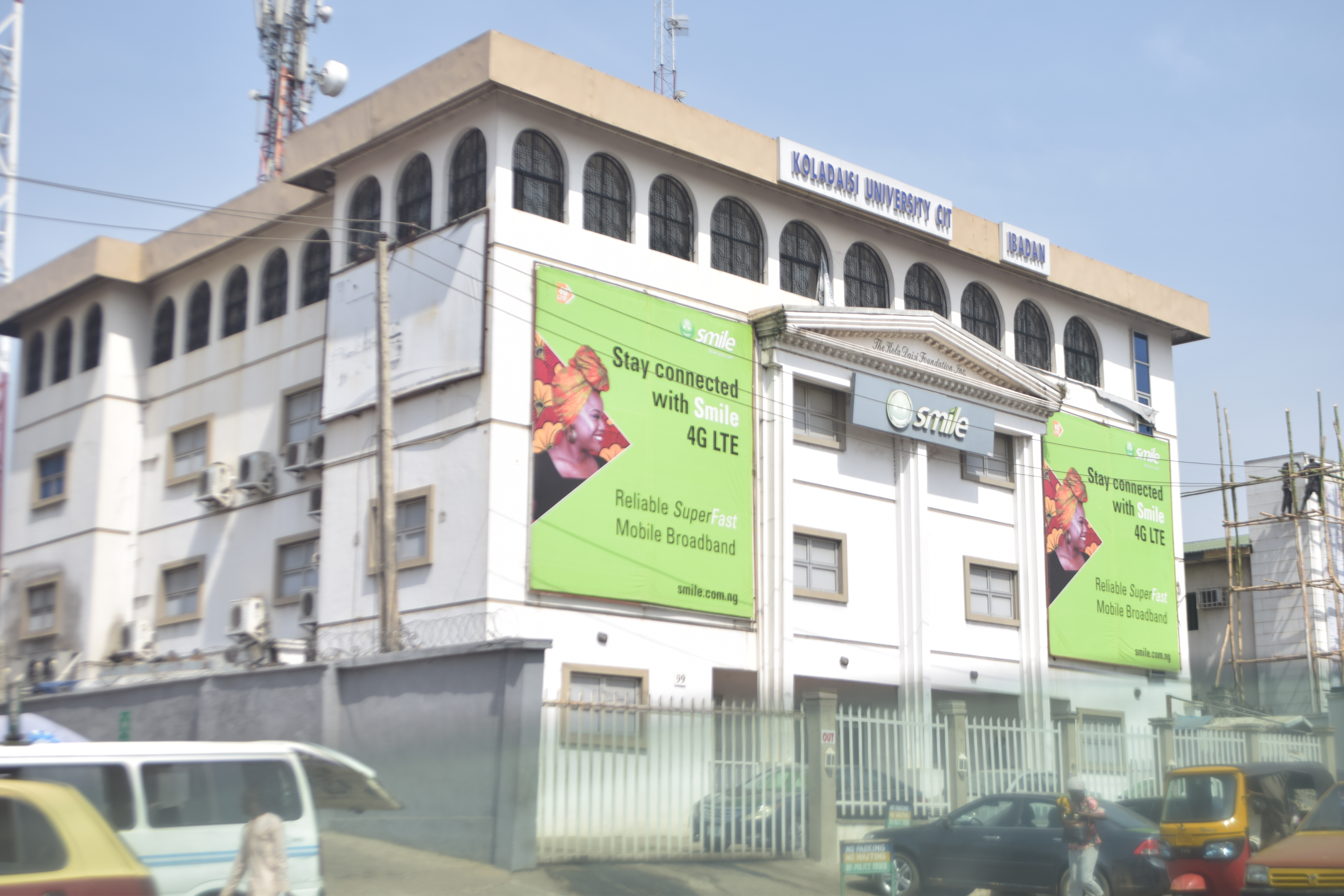
Koladaisi University

KolaDaisi University (KDU) is a private university in Ibadan, Oyo State, Nigeria. It is associated with the KolaDaisi Foundation (KDF). KolaDaisi University (KDU), after approval by the Federal Executive Council, was licensed by the National Universities Commission to operate as a private university in November 2016.

== History ==
On 4 November 2021, the school announced the appointment of the first chancellor of the institution. In 2023, the National University Commission (NUC) granted approval for KolaDaisi University to offer nursing, medical laboratory science, and some basic medical science courses.

== Ranking ==
KolaDaisi University was ranked 121st among Nigerian universities by one ranking.
