= Federal College of Education (Special), Oyo =

Nigerian University, in Oyo state Nigeria

- Type: University
- Established: 1977
- Provost: Dr. Ademola Salami
- Location: Oyo, Nigeria
- Campus: Public
- Website: https://nce.fcesoyo.edu.ng/

Federal College of Education (Special), Oyo also known as FCE OYO was established on 5 October 1977, as Federal Advanced Teacher's college (Special). The institution, according to a UNDP/UNESCO 1996 report (NIR/87/008) "... Has the best qualify Staff in Special Education not only in Nigeria but in West, North, East and Central Africa." The College is the only one of its kind in Nigeria and sub-Saharan Africa. It has the largest conglomeration of disabled students that could be found in any Higher Institution in Nigeria and the largest concentration of specialized facilities for teaching and training of teachers of the Handicapped in Nigeria. During its 40th anniversary celebration, the college gave special recognition award to former President Olusegun Obasanjo whose military administration brought about the upgrading of the Institution from the then Federal Advanced Teachers College to a College of Education with the mandate to award the National Certificate of Education (NCE) in 1977.

The institution is funded and managed my the Federal Government of Nigeria, it offers full time courses in Technology, Science, Arts, Management and social Sciences.

== Schools ==
1. School of Secondary Education - Arts & Social Sciences
2. School of General Education
3. School of Secondary Education - Languages
4. School of Secondary Education - Sciences Programmes
5. School of Special Education
6. School of Secondary Education - Vocational & Technical Education
7. School of Early Childhood Care, Primary and Adult & Non Formal Education
8. school of General Studies Education

== Courses ==
The courses offered by the institution are listed below;

1. Primary Education Studies
2. Education and Mathematics
3. Special Education/Agricultural Science
4. Special Education/Economics
5. Special Education/Social Studies
6. Special Education/Christian Religion Studies
7. Special Education/Islamic Studies
8. Special Education/Geography
9. Special Education/Biology
10. Special Education/English
11. Special Education/ Adult and Non-Formal Education
12. History (Double major)
13. physics (Double major)
14. Cultural and creative Art (Double major)
15. Special Education/ Home Economics
16. Special Education/ Political science
17. special Education/ Music
18. Special Education/ Yoruba
19. Special Education/Theatre Art
20. History
21. Special Education / Business Education
22. Special Education/ Computer science
23. Special Education/ Arabic
24. Special Education/ Fine Art ( D /M )
25. Special Education/French
26. Special Education /Hausa
27. Special Education/ Igbo
28. Special Education/ Physical and Health Education
29. Special Education/ Early Childhood Care Education

The institution attache students to workplaces that advanced them to gain practical experiences through the Student Industrial Work Experience Scheme (SIWES) programme.

== The provost ==
On 7 July 2023, the college appointed Dr. Rauf Ademola Salami as her 7th substantive provost.

== Admission requirements ==
Candidates seeking for admission into the Federal College of Education (Special), Oyo must have at least five credits in either WAEC, NECO or NABTEB examination bodies with subjects that included Mathematics, English language and any other 3 relevant subjects and must have chosen Federal College of Education (Special), Oyo as first choice in Jamb Utme with a score that is above 100 points in the Unified Matriculation Tertiary Examination(UTME).

== Proposed upgrade from college ==
The former provost of the college stated that the college will be upgraded to a degree awarding college in special education and that will be the first in Nigeria.
