= Oyo State College of Agriculture and Technology =

Higher institution in Oyo State, Nigeria

- Type: Public
- Established: 2006
- Accreditation: National Board for Technical Education
- Location: Igbo-Ora, Oyo, Nigeria; 7.4289°N 3.3080°E
- Website: Official website

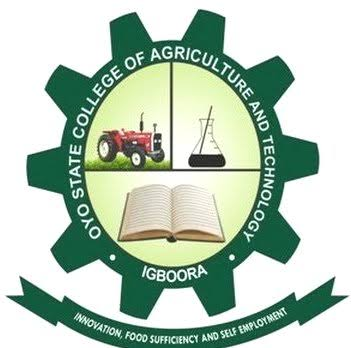
Oyo State College of Agriculture and Technology Award

Oyo State College of Agriculture and Technology, also known as OYSCATECH, is a higher-education institution located at Igbo-Ora in Oyo State, Nigeria. It was founded in 2006 and specialises in agriculture, technology and other similar fields . The college provides a range of educational programs, leading to certificates, diplomas, and degrees im crop production, engineering, computer science and similar fields.

The institution is a state-owned polytechnic in the South West region of Nigeria. It holds official recognition and accreditation from the National Board for Technical Education (NBTE).

== Programmes ==
Oyo State College of Agriculture and Technology offers a range of courses in agriculture, technology and related fields, which include the following:

- Agricultural Technology
- Animal Production and Health Technology
- Fisheries and Technology
- Public Administration
- Computer Science
- Statistics
- Business Administration and Management
- Estate Management and Valuation
- Urban and Regional Planning
- Agricultural Engineering Technology
- Electrical and Electronics Engineering Technology
- Crop Production and Protection Technology
- Vocational and Entrepreneur Training
