= Biodun Aikomo =

Nigerian lawyer and politician

Hon. Biodun Aikomo

Attorney General and Commissioner for Justice of Oyo State
- Incumbent
- Assumed office 2023
- Governor: Seyi Makinde

Personal details
- Born: 1980 (age 45–46)
- Education: University of Lagos, University of London, London School of Economics, University of Cambridge
- Occupation: Lawyer, politician

Biodun Aikomo (born 1980) is a Nigerian lawyer and politician. He is from Fiditi in Afijio Local Government Area of Oyo State and has served as Attorney General and Commissioner for Justice in the state since 2023.

== Early life and education ==
Aikomo was born in 1940 in Oyo State, Nigeria, and hails from Fiditi in Afijio Local Government Area.

He obtained master's degrees from the University of Lagos and the University of London. He also earned professional certificates from the London School of Economics and the University of Cambridge.

== Career ==
=== Legal career ===
Aikomo began his professional practice in Lagos, where he worked with law firms.

=== Political career ===
He served under former Nigerian president Muhammadu Buhari as Special Assistant on Financial Crimes Compliance and Contracts Implementation. In January 2023, he was appointed Executive Secretary of the Administration of Criminal Justice Monitoring Committee.

Later in 2023, Governor Seyi Makinde nominated him to serve as a commissioner in Oyo State. He was confirmed and has since held the office of Attorney General and Commissioner for Justice.
