= Ado-Awaye =

Town in Nigeria

Coordinates: 7.832°N 3.431°E

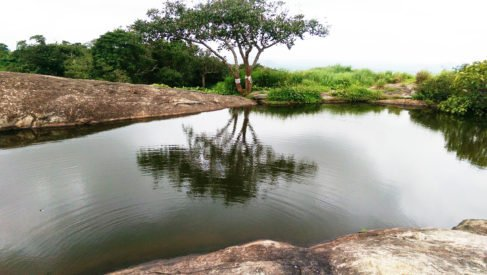
Suspended lake at Ado-Awaye

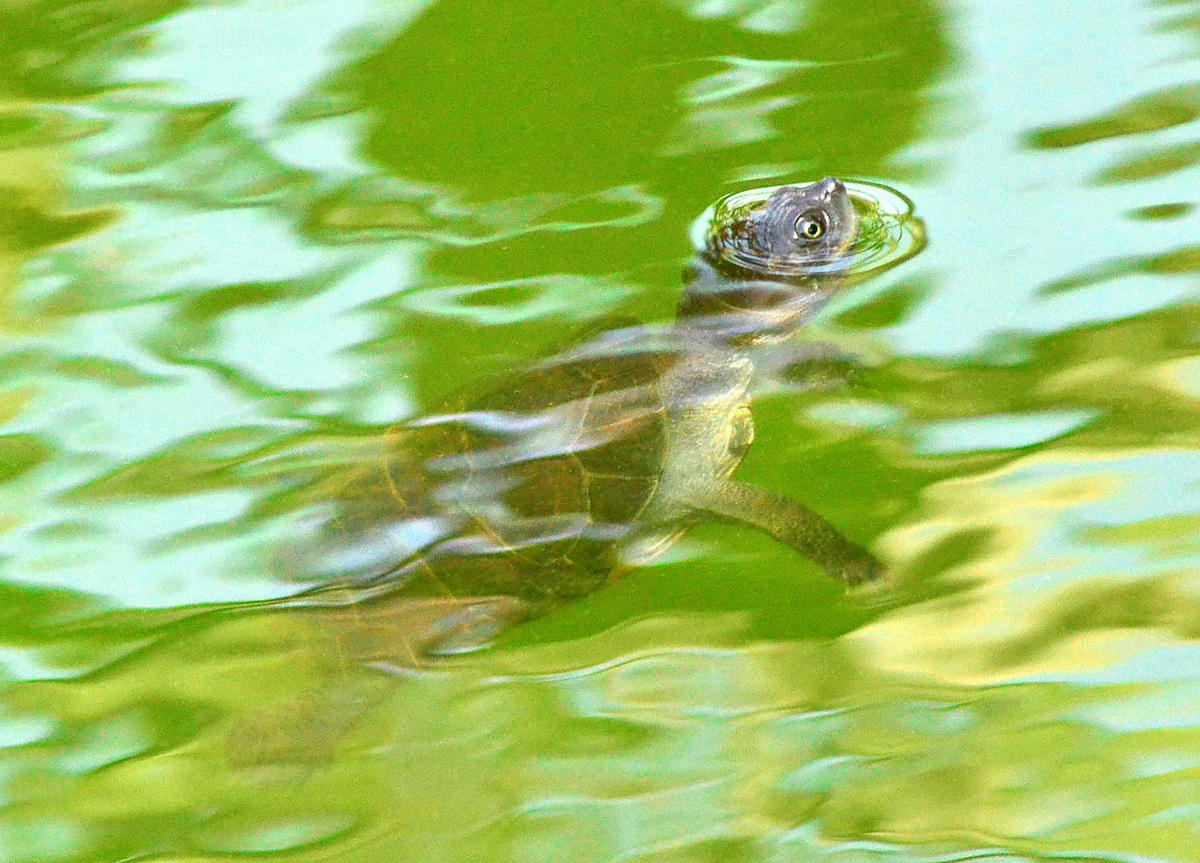
Mud turtle in Iyake suspended lake.

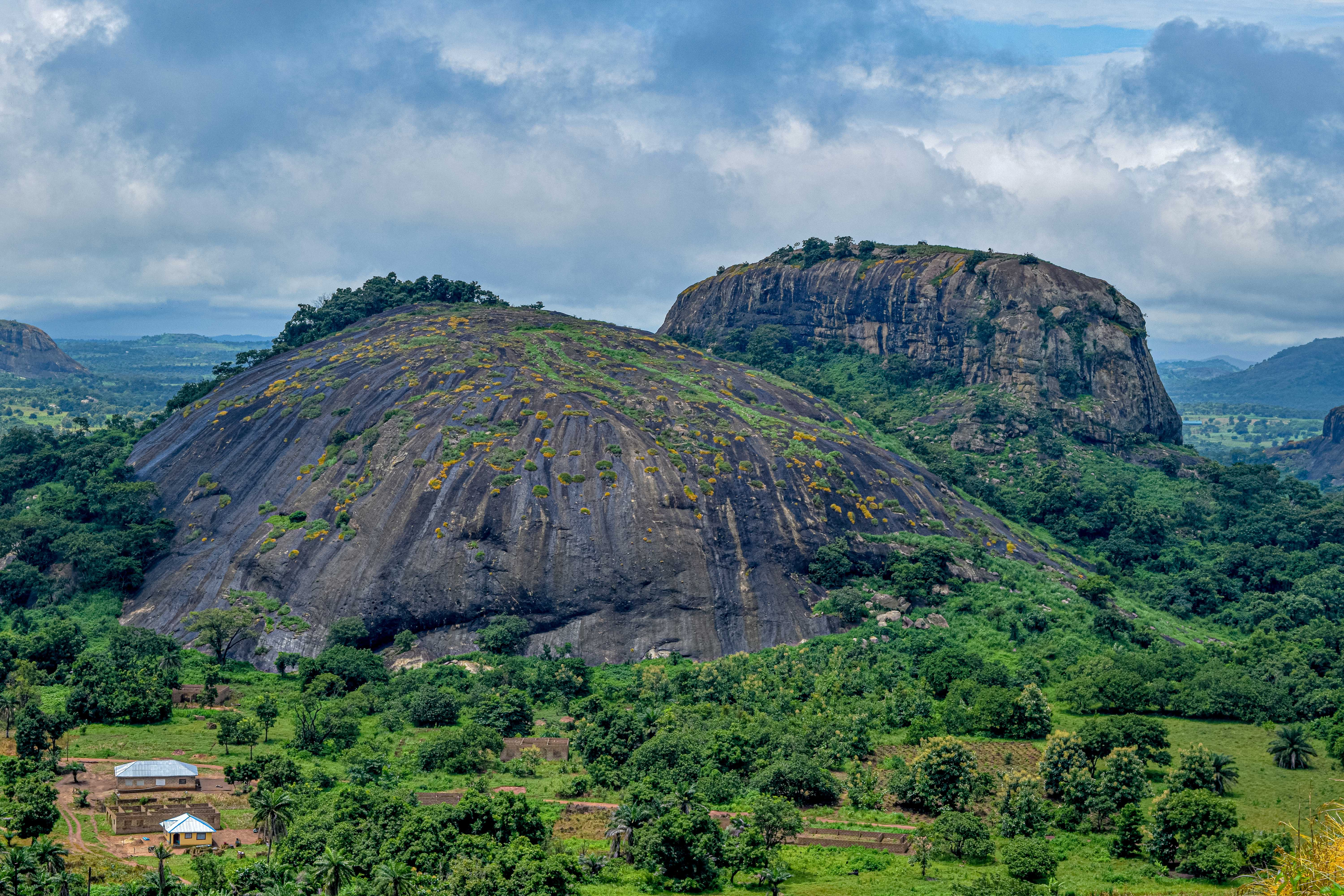
Rocks in Ado-Awaye Village in Oyo State, Nigeria (1)

Ado-Awaye is a town in Oyo State, Nigeria. It is popular for its hill (Oke Ado), upon which is a lake (Iyake), one of only two suspended lakes in the world.

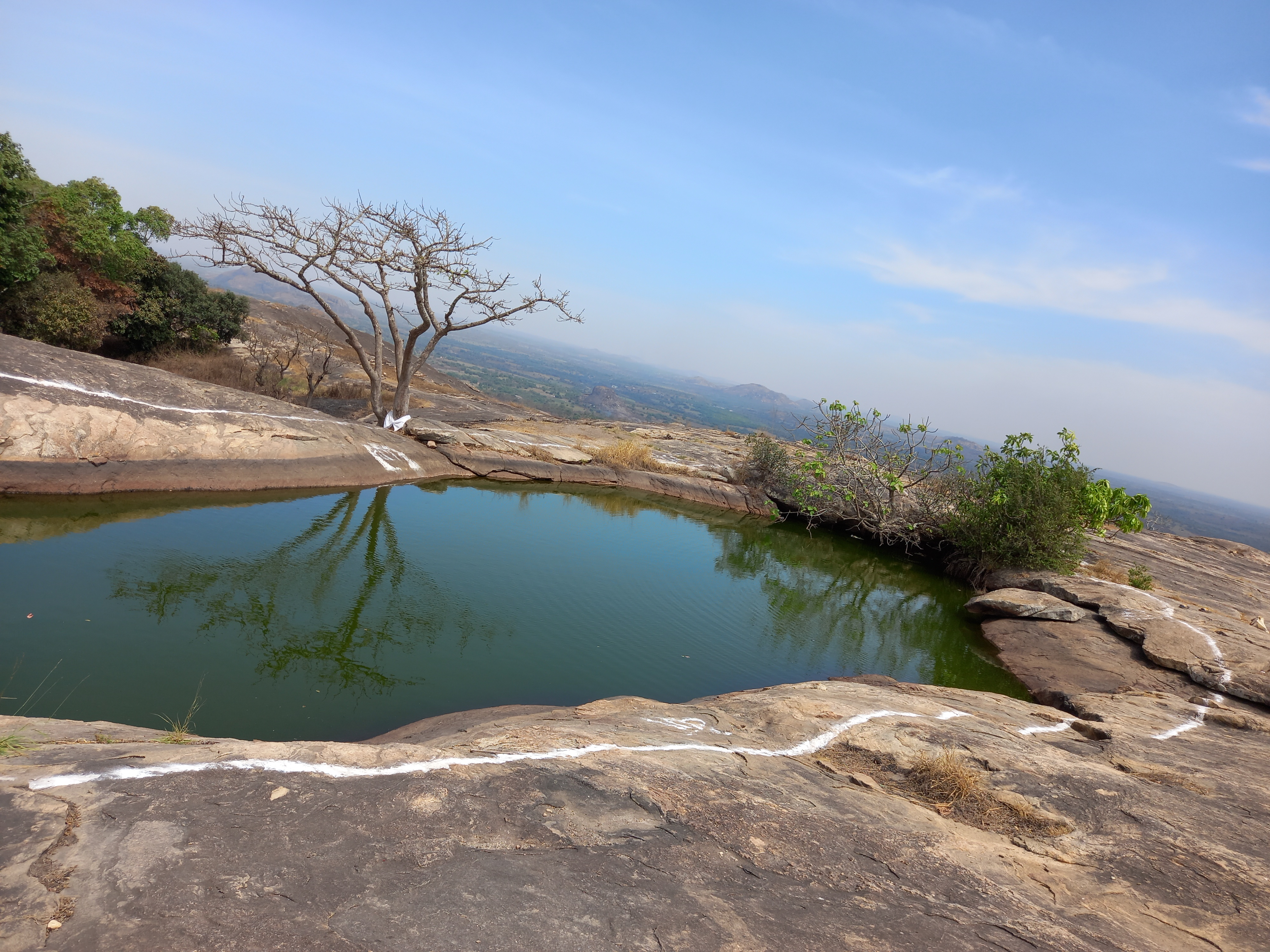
Ado-Awaye suspended lake
