= Hanging Lake =

Lake in Colorado, United States

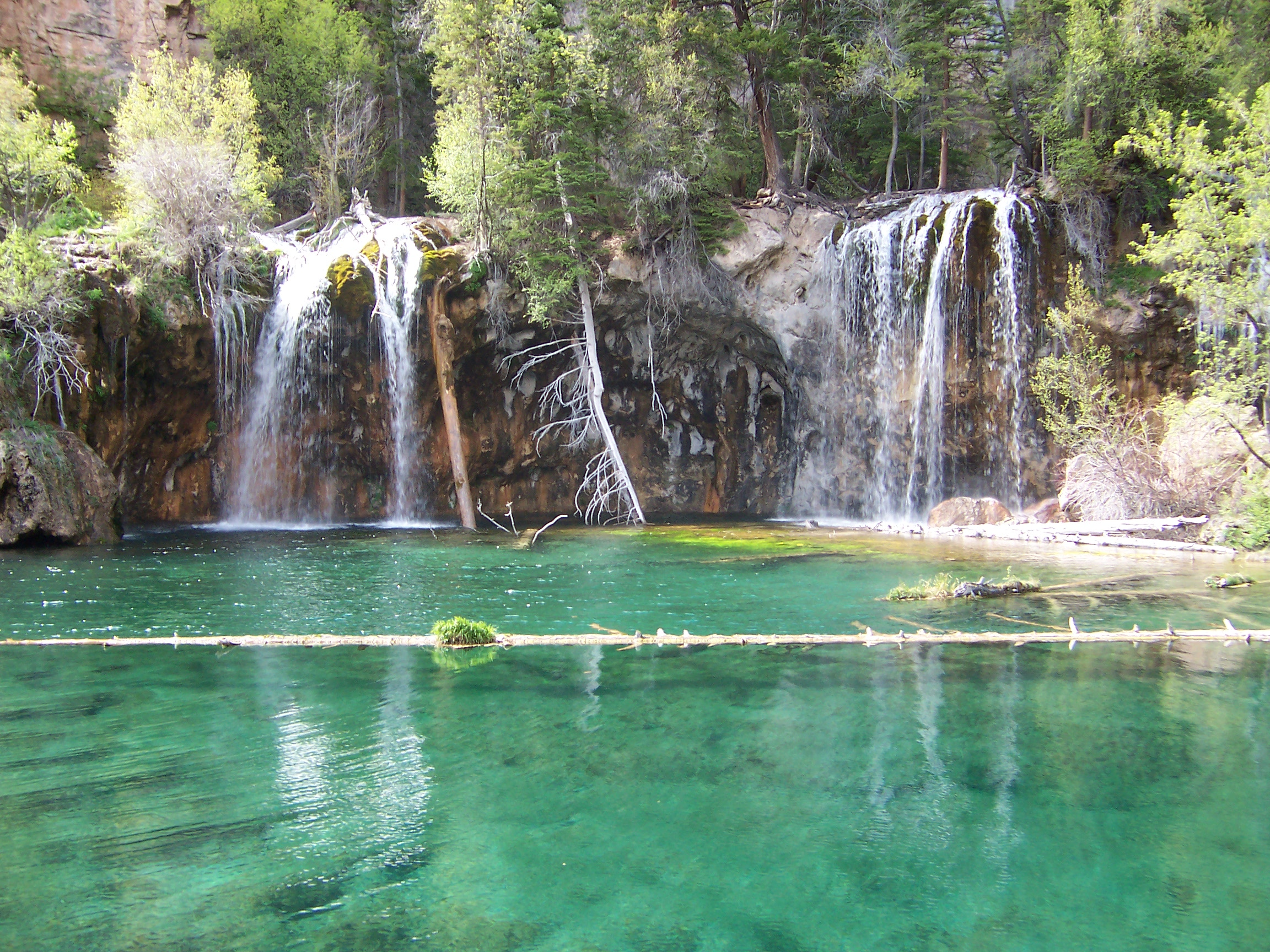

- Location within Colorado Location within the United States
- Location: Glenwood Canyon, Colorado
- Coordinates: 39.60165°N 107.191997°W
- Basin countries: United States
- Surface elevation: 7,323 ft (2,232 m)

U.S. National Natural Landmark
- Designated: June 2011

Hanging Lake is a lake in the U.S. State of Colorado. It is located in Glenwood Canyon, about 7 miles (11 km) east of Glenwood Springs, Colorado and is a popular tourist destination. When open, the lake is reached via a trailhead located along the Glenwood Canyon Bike and Pedestrian Path that runs along the north side of I-70 in the bottom of the canyon. The trail follows Dead Horse Creek, a tributary of the Colorado River and ascends some 1,000 feet (300 m) in elevation for 1.2 miles (1.9 km) from the trailhead to the lake.

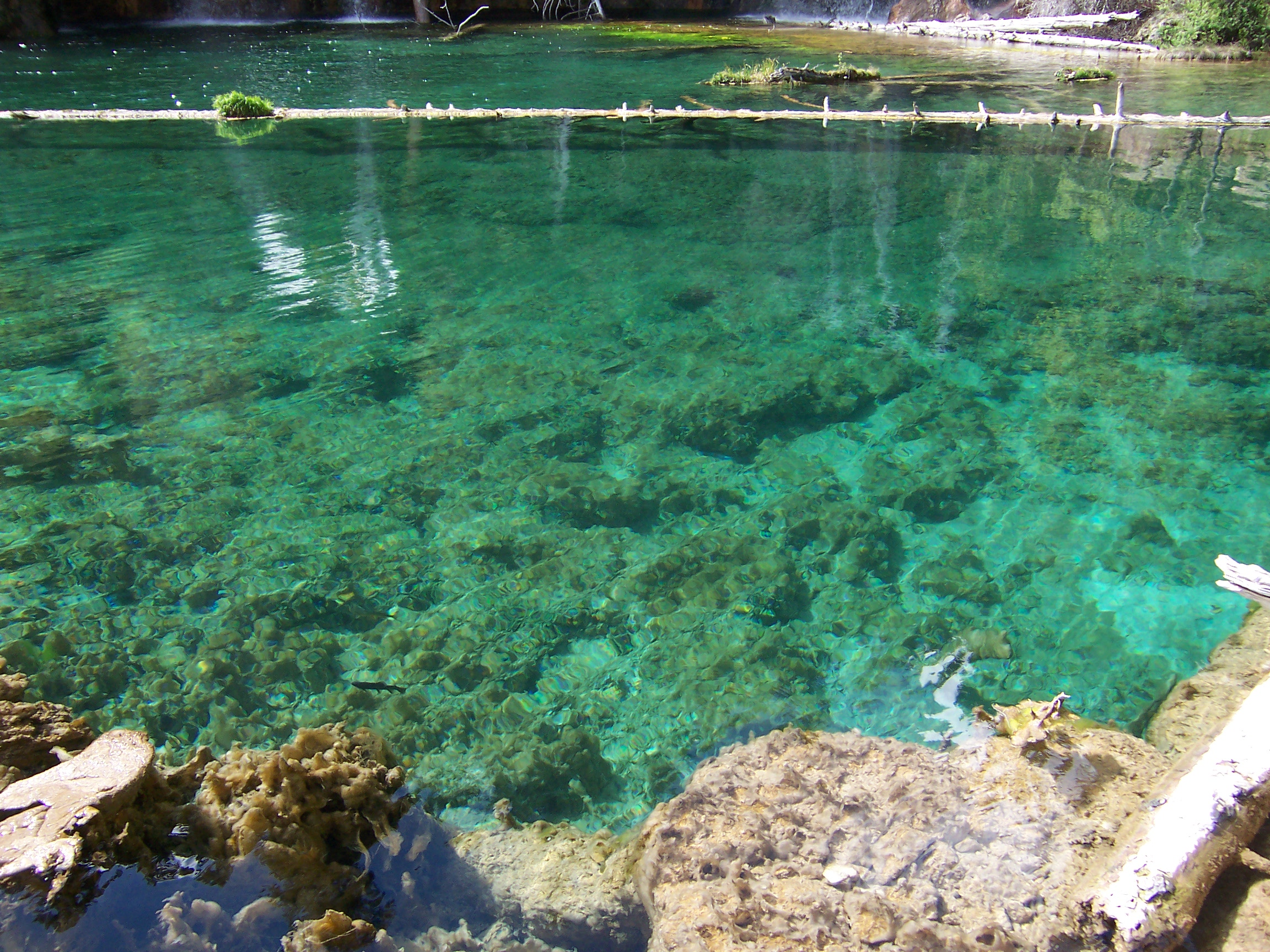
Hanging Lake

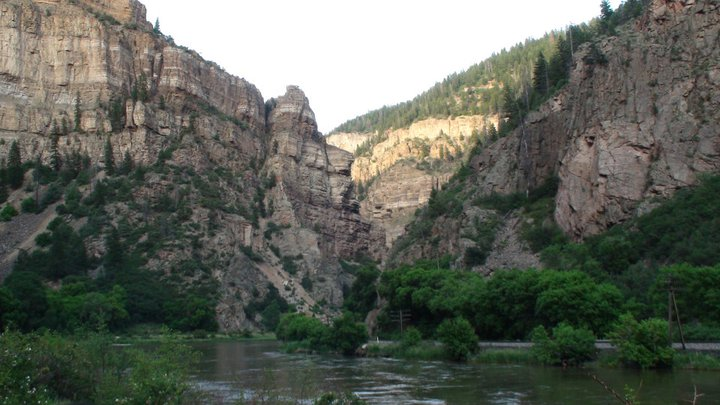
View of the Glenwood Canyon from the Hanging Lake trail

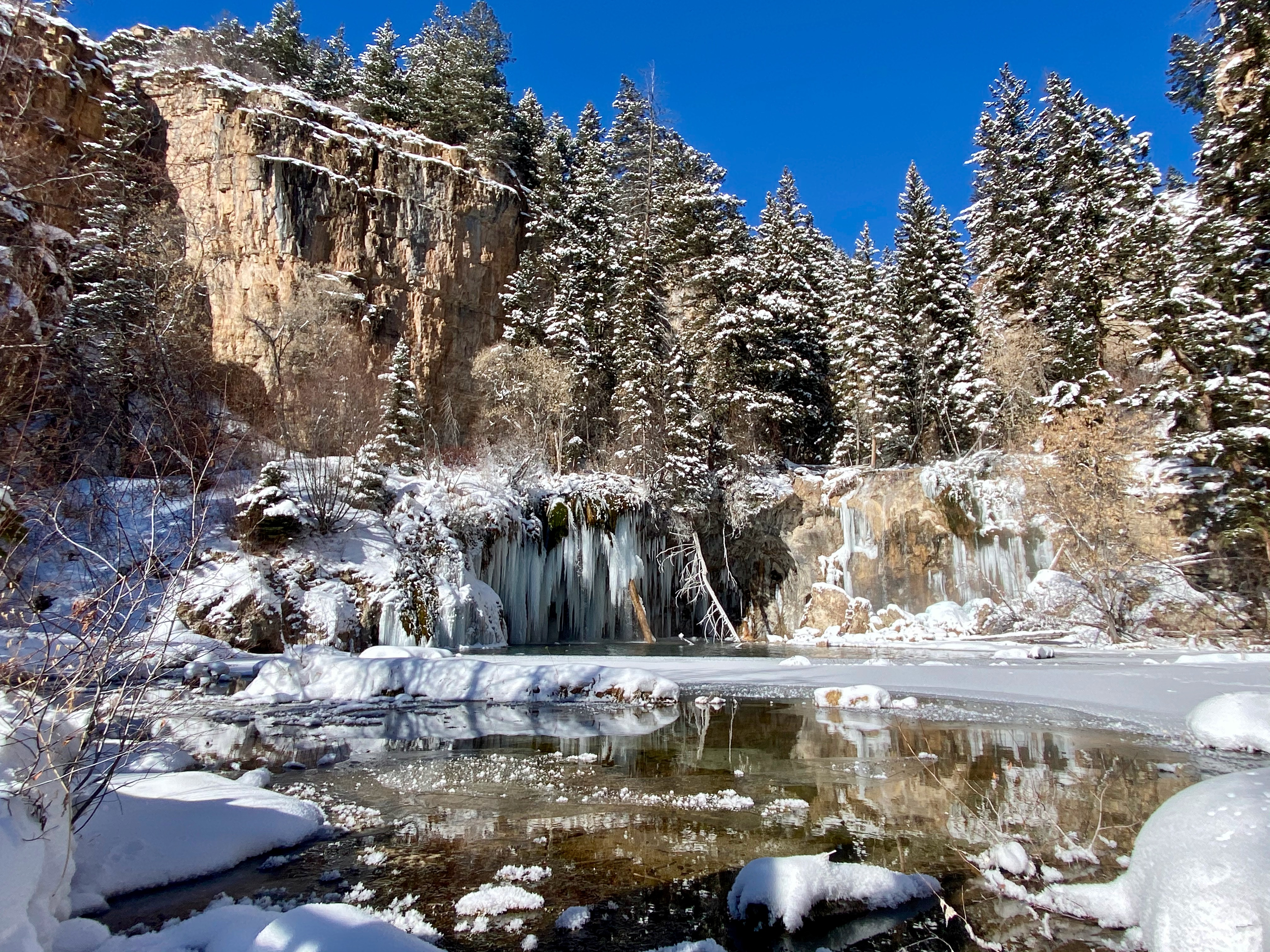
Hanging Lake Winter 2019

== History ==
Early tales of the discovery of the lake tell of a man searching for gold in the canyon. The man found a dead horse at the opening of a gulch (the possible origin of the name of Dead Horse Gulch). When he followed the gulch up through the steep hillside through the canyon he came around the back side of the lake. This is how he first saw the small bowl-like basin hanging onto the cliffs below.

In the years following, the area served as a homestead and a private family retreat until it was purchased by Glenwood Springs after the Taylor Bill was passed by Congress in 1910.

Following the purchase it began its long history as a public tourist stop, and later during the 1940s hosted a resort and cafe until the construction of Interstate-70 began in 1968.

In 1972, the trail and the lake were returned to the protection of the Forest Service as part of the White River National Forest, and has been an increasingly popular tourist destination since.

In 2011, the lake was named a National Natural Landmark by Secretary of the Interior Ken Salazar.

== Geology and travertine ==
The fragile shoreline of Hanging Lake is composed of travertine, created when dissolved limestone from the Mississippian Period Leadville Limestone (through which Dead Horse Creek flows) is deposited on rocks and logs, creating travertine layers.

Hanging Lake is located on a fault line and was formed when roughly an acre and a half of the valley floor sheared off from the fault and dropped to what is now the shallow bed of the lake. The turquoise colors of the lake are produced by carbonate minerals that have dissolved in the water.

== Recreation ==
Hanging Lake is one of the most popular hiking destinations in Colorado. Beginning May 1, 2019, a paid permit is required to access the trailhead to Hanging Lake. Access fees vary by season.

On February 22, 2019, The Forest Service and the City of Glenwood Springs announced that H2O Ventures (Glenwood Springs, Colorado) was awarded the contract for the Hanging Lake Shuttle service, set to launch on May 1, 2019.

The Hanging Lake parking area in Glenwood Canyon will be closed to personal vehicles during the peak season, May 1 to October 31, when the shuttle service is in operation. Those wishing to bike to the trailhead and hike to Hanging Lake still need to secure a reservation in advance.

The entire hike is approximately 2.4 miles round trip, and 2 hours of hiking time. Behind the lake, hikers will discover Spouting Rock, a much larger waterfall that flows from a set of holes in the limestone cliffs of Dead Horse Canyon.

Hanging Lake receives over 131,000 visitors per year.

=== Winter access ===
During the winter, the Hanging Lake Trail is icy, snow-packed, and slippery. The use of winter traction devices is required (e.g. ice cleats, micro-spikes, mini crampons) as well as hiking poles. Cold temperatures also necessitate appropriate clothing, food, water, equipment, and winter survival gear. Hiking the trail may take longer due to winter conditions.

=== Restricted activities ===
The travertine lake is extremely sensitive, therefore dogs, drones, fishing, and swimming (or bodily contact with water at Hanging Lake) are strictly prohibited. Visitors cannot harass, feed, or disturb wild animals, particularly during winter when they are conserving energy to stay alive. During winter, visitors are strongly warned to stay off the frozen lake (whether partially or fully frozen) because it is extremely dangerous to walk on the ice. Even during winter, walking off-trail is not permitted. Parking at Hanging Lake parking area is only allowed Nov. 1 - April 30 with a reservation. Parking is not allowed along entrance or exit ramps of I-70 at any time.

== Threats ==
Because of the high amount of traffic, Hanging Lake faces the threats of ecological destruction. Litter from visitors, and the effects of wading and swimming by humans and dogs (dogs and swimming are both prohibited), are having a significant impact on the peculiar ecosystem of the lake.

== See also ==
- List of lakes in Colorado
- Glenwood Canyon
- Iyake Lake
