= Adelola Adeloye =

Nigerian academic and neurosurgeon

Chief Adelola Adeloye (born Rufus Bandele Adelola Adeloye; 1935–2021) was a Nigerian neurological surgeon and academic who in 1971 together with Latunde Odeku described the Adeloye-Odeku disease.

== Early life and education ==
Adelola Adeloye was born in Ilesa, Osun State on 18 July 1935. His roots trace back to Ikole-Ekiti, Ekiti State. He was the first of five children born to Ebenezer Ajayi and Elizabeth (Ajisomo) Adeloye.

Adeloye's primary education took place at St. Paul's CMS Elementary School from 1941 to 1946. He then attended Christ's School in Ado-Ekiti for his secondary education, completing his studies in 1952 with a Cambridge School Leaving Certificate. He was a recipient of a government scholarship throughout his secondary education.

From 1953 to 1960, Adeloye attended University College, Ibadan (now University of Ibadan), also on a government scholarship. He obtained a Bachelor of Medicine and Bachelor of Surgery.

In 1973, Adeloye received a master's degree in surgery from the University of London. His thesis, Tangenital wound of the head in Nigerian Soldiers, detailed his encounters with neurotraumatic patients during the Nigeria Civil War.

== Membership and fellowship ==
Adeloye became a member of the Royal College of Physicians of Edinburgh in 1965; a Fellow of the Royal College of Surgeons in 1966; a Fellow of the Royal Society of Medicine, England in 1967; a Fellow of the International College of Surgeons and Nigerian Medical College of Surgery in 1972; a Fellow of the West African College of Surgeons in 1973; a Fellow of the Royal College of Physicians of Edinburgh in 1979; a Fellow of the Nigerian Academy of Science in 1987; a Fellow of the Association of Surgeons of Malawi in 1993; a Foundation Fellow of the College of Surgeons of East and Central Africa in 1999; and an Honorary Fellow of the American College of Surgeons in 2009.

Adeloye was a founding member of the Pan-African Association of Neurological Sciences in 1972. He served as the second vice-president of the World Federation of Neurosurgical Societies (WFNS) from 1981 to 1985. In 2001, he was elected an Honorary President for Life by the WFNS. He also holds the title of Honorary President for Life of the PAANS, the Nigerian Society of Neurological Sciences (NSNS), and the Nigerian Academy of Neurological Surgeons (NANS). In 1988, Adeloye was elected the president of the Neurosurgery section of the Nigerian Society of Neurological Sciences. He served as president of the Surgical Association of Malawi from 1998 to 2000 and was the founding president of the Neurosurgical Society of East and Central Africa in 1999. In 2010, the University of Ibadan named Adeloye an emeritus professor of neurosurgery.

== Career ==
=== Medicine ===
Adeloye completed the membership examination of the Royal College of Physicians of Edinburgh with Neurology as his special subject in July 1965 and a fellowship examination of the Royal College of Surgeons of England in November 1966. He refers to himself as a Neurological Surgeon, a Neurophysician who operates on the nervous system.

After returning to Nigeria, Adeloye worked as a post-Fellowship Senior Registrar at University College Hospital (UCH; now University of Ibadan Hospital) from December 1967 to July 1968. He was appointed as a Consultant Neurosurgeon in August 1968, a role he held until 1995.

Adeloye served as a locum consultant Neurosurgeon at the King Faisal Specialist Hospital and Research Centre in Saudi Arabia from November to December 1987. He then moved to Kuwait, where he headed the Neurosurgery department at Al-Adan Government Hospital from January 1988 to October 1990. During his time in Kuwait, Iraq invaded Kuwait, leading to the First Gulf War. Adeloye and other expatriates were stranded due to the closure of embassies, suspension of air transport services, and severance of telecommunications. Adeloye assisted in the evacuation of 84 Africans to Baghdad, an experience he later documented in his book, Inside Occupied Kuwait, published in 2006.

In 1971, Adeloye and Odeku described the Adeloye-Odeku disease. Initially thought to be confined to Africa, the condition has since been reported worldwide across all racial groups.

=== Academic career ===
Adeloye worked as a temporary lecturer at the University of Ibadan (UI) from August 1968 to November 1969, followed by a senior lecturer from November 1969 to September 1972. He was appointed as a professor of Neurological Surgery in October 1972 and served as the Head of Surgery from 1974 to 1977.

Adeloye was a Rockefeller Research Fellow in Experimental Teratology at the University of Cincinnati, USA from 1972 to 1973 and a Ratanji Dalai Scholar of the Royal College of Surgeons of England from 1973 to 1974, focusing on CNS malformations.

After the Iraqi invasion of Kuwait, Adeloye moved to Malawi under the short-term professional staff scheme of the World Health Organization in 1991. He served as a professor and head of surgery at the College of Medicine, University of Malawi, and was a member of the university's senate from July 1991 to March 2001.

Following his retirement, Adeloye taught Neuroanatomy at Bowen University and Ladoke Akintola University of Technology in Nigeria, and the University of Sheffield in the UK.

== Bibliography ==
- Nigerian Pioneers of Modern Medicine: Selected Writings (1977)
- African Pioneers of Modern Medicine: Nigerian Doctors of the Nineteenth Century (1985)
- Early medical schools in Nigeria (1998)
- Practice and Practitioners of Medicine in Nigeria (2004)
- A village genius: The story of my father (2004)
- My salad days: the primary school years (2009)
- My Secondary School Saga (2013)
- Henry Dallimore: Founder of Christ's School, Ado-Ekiti (1970)
- E. LatundeOdeku: An African Neurosurgeon (1976), * Doctor James Africanus Beale Horton: West African Medical Scientist of the Nineteenth Century (1992)
- Compendium of Principals and Vice Chancellors of University of Ibadan (2015)
- The biography of Codanda Kamala Kalappa Adeloye (2015)

== Personal life ==
In October 1967, Adeloye married Kamala Codanda Kappala Adeloye, a paediatrician from India. The couple has three children and several grandchildren.

Adeloye received the title of Atorise of Ikole-Ekiti on 7 April 2018.
