= Afijio =

- LGA
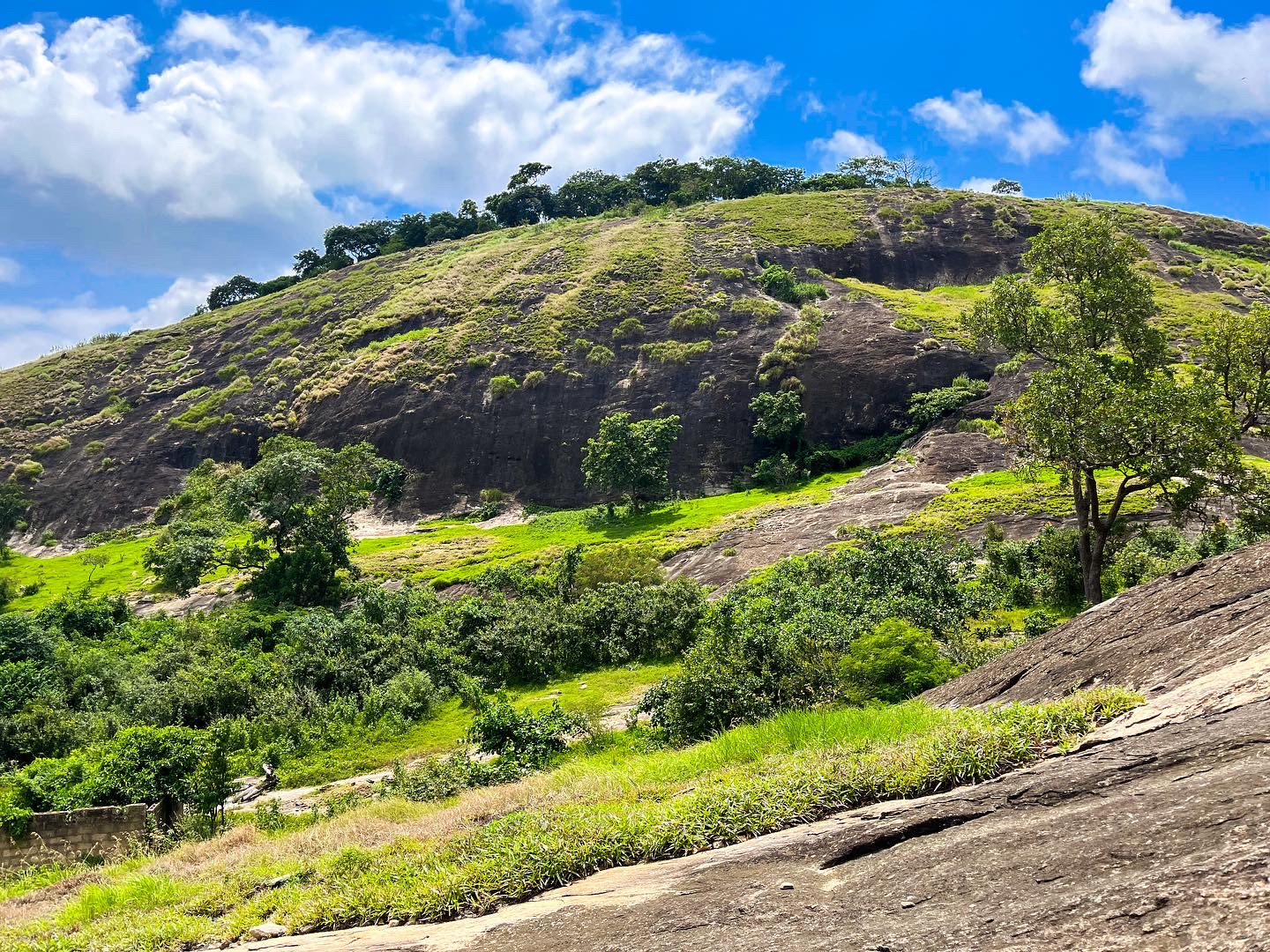
- Ese Oloja hill in ilora, Afijio LGA
- Interactive map of Afijio
- Location within Nigeria Location within Africa
- Coordinates: 7°48′N 3°54′E
- Country: Nigeria
- State: Oyo State
- Headquarter: Jobele

Government
  - Local Government Chairman and the Head of the Local Government Council: Emmanuel Olufemi Aikomo (PDP)

Area
  - Total: 722 km^{2} (279 sq mi)

Population (2010)2010 estimated population size of 152,193 using a growth rate of 3.2% from 2006 census figures.
  - Total: 152,193
  - Density: 211/km^{2} (546/sq mi)
- Time zone: UTC+1 (WAT)
- Postal code: 211
- Website: Afijio

Afijio is a Local Government Area in Oyo State, Nigeria. Its headquarter is in the town of Jobele.

It has an area of 722 km^{2} and a population of 134,173 at the 2006 census.

The postal code of the area is 211.

== History ==
In 1989, the then-Federal Military Government chose to separate the former Oyo Local Government Area into autonomous council districts, resulting in the formation of the current Afijio Local Government.

Afijio Local Council, as history has it, has been established three (3) times. The Afijio Provisional Authority was established in 1964. Second, in 1981, the entire area was merged with Oyo Local Government before it was reestablished as an autonomous political entity in May 1989 under the name Afijio, which is an acronym for Awe, Akinmoorin, Fiditi, Ilora, Imini, Jobele, Iware, Iluaje, Oluwatedo, and Ojutaye, the major towns that comprise the Local Government.

Afijio Local Government is mostly controlled by Yorubas. The indigenous peoples' primary religions are Christianity and Islam. Nonetheless, traditional believers operate freely within the council's jurisdiction.

== Economy ==
The indigenous people of Afijio Local Government are largely farmers who grow a wide range of agricultural goods such as maize, yam, cassava, groundnut, fruit, cocoa and oil palm.

== Geography ==
The Afijio local government region has an average temperature of 28.5 degrees Celsius or 83.3 degrees Fahrenheit and a total size of 722 sq km (279 mi²).

== Political Wards in Afijio Local Government Area ==
The local government is governed by an elected chairman and 10 councilors elected from each ward.

Afijio local government area is sub-divided into 10 wards: Ilora I, Ilora II, Ilora III, Fiditi I, Fiditi II, Aawe I, Aawe II, Akinmorin/Jobele, Iware and Imini.

== Prominent towns and villages in Afijio ==
- Aawe
- Akinmoorin
- Fiditi
- Ilora
- Iware
- Jobele
- Ore lope

== Notable people ==
- Gabriel Mojisola Babatunde (1938-2017), professor of animal science
- Latunde Odeku (1927-1974), Nigerian neurosurgeon
