= Elephant tree =

Elephant tree is a common name for several plants with swollen stems and may refer to:

- Boswellia papyrifera, a species in the family Burserceae native to northeastern Africa
- Bursera microphylla, a species in the family Burserceae native to the southwestern United States and northern Mexico
- Operculicarya decaryi, a species in the family Anacardiaceae native to Madagascar, and cultivated for bonsai
- Pachycormus discolor, a species in the family Anacardiaceae native to Baja California
