= Rotimi Adelola =

Nigerian psychologist and film producer (born 1958)

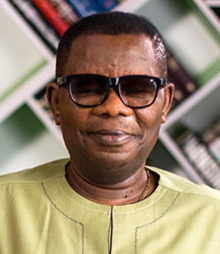

Secretary to the Ondo State Government
- In office 19 March 2009 – 24 February 2017
- Governor: Olusegun Mimiko
- Preceded by: Isaac Kekemeke
- Succeeded by: Ifedayo Abegunde

Personal details
- Born: Aderotimi Adelola; 15 August 1958 (age 68) Ondo, Western Region, British Nigeria (now in Ondo State, Nigeria)
- Spouse: Modupe Adelola
- Education: Obafemi Awolowo University; University of Ibadan; University of Lagos
- Occupation: Politician; psychologist; film producer
- Website: www.rotimiadelola.com

Rotimi Adelola (born 15 August 1958) is a Nigerian psychologist and film producer. Under the Administration of Olusegun Mimiko, he was appointed secretary to the Ondo State Government, a position which he held from 2009 to 2017. As a Psychologist, he worked across the following sectors: academia, manufacturing, consultancy, financial services, oil & gas and the public sector.

== Early life and education ==
Rotimi Adelola was born on 15 August 1958, at Ondo City in Ondo State, Nigeria. Although he was born in Ondo City, his ancestral origin is Araromi-Obu and he is a Prince of the ancient kingdom. He holds a Ph.D. in Organisational Psychology from the University of Ibadan. Earlier, he obtained M.Sc. in psychology from the University of Lagos and a B.Sc. degree (2nd class upper) in Social Sciences from the University of Ife (now Obafemi Awolowo University). Dr. Rotimi Adelola is an alumnus of the International Development Ireland, Dublin, the London Management School and the Harvard-Kennedy School of Government, Harvard University USA.

== Filmmaking ==
Immediately after leaving office in 2017, he attended Mainframe Media And Film Institute owned by Tunde Kelani in Abeokuta, Nigeria and he was trained as a Film Producer. His production studio, NUMBER 9 Film Studio released his second movie, The New Patriots, on 11 June 2021 in Nigeria.
