= Oyo State =

State of Nigeria

Oyo
- State
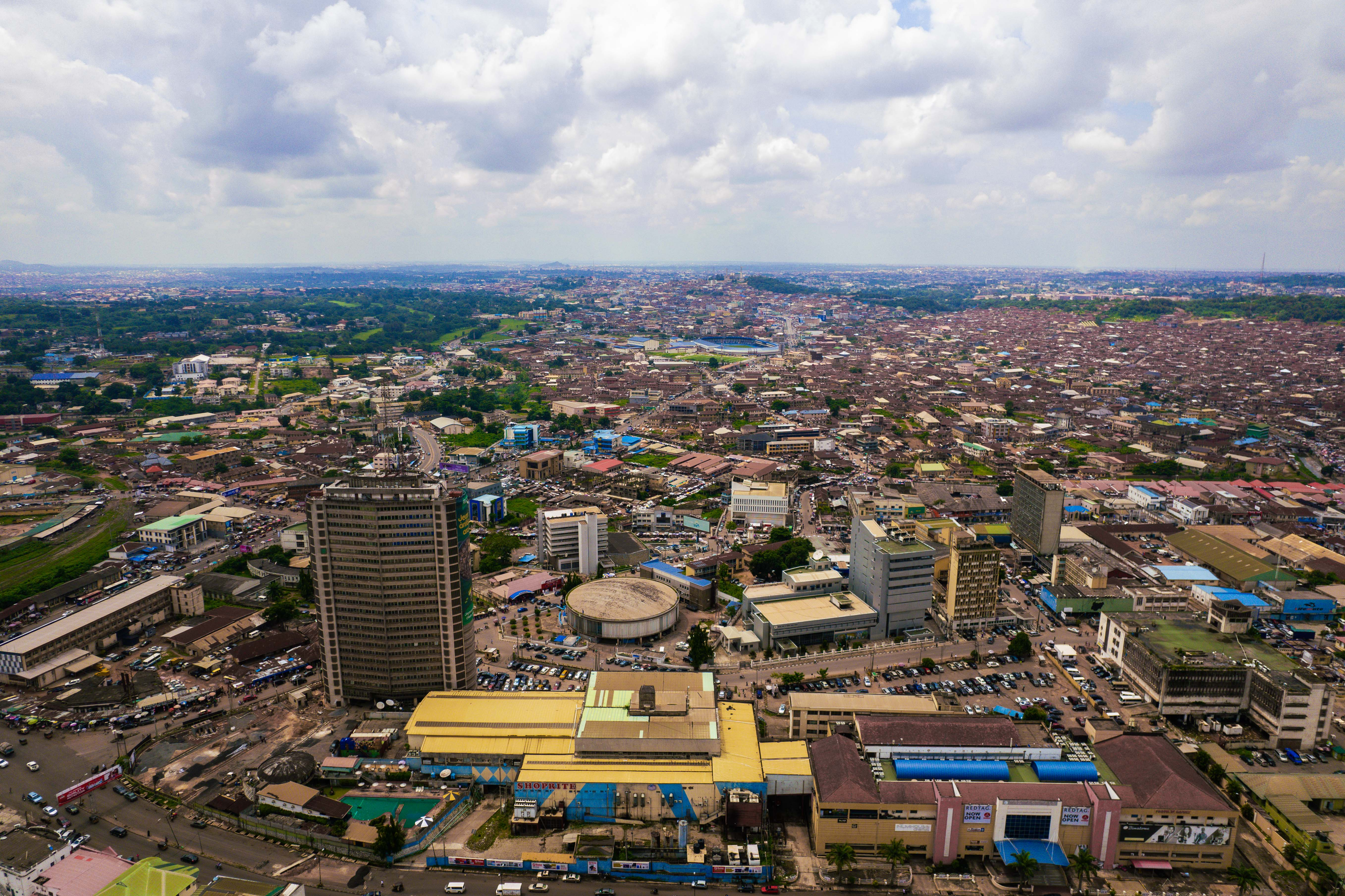
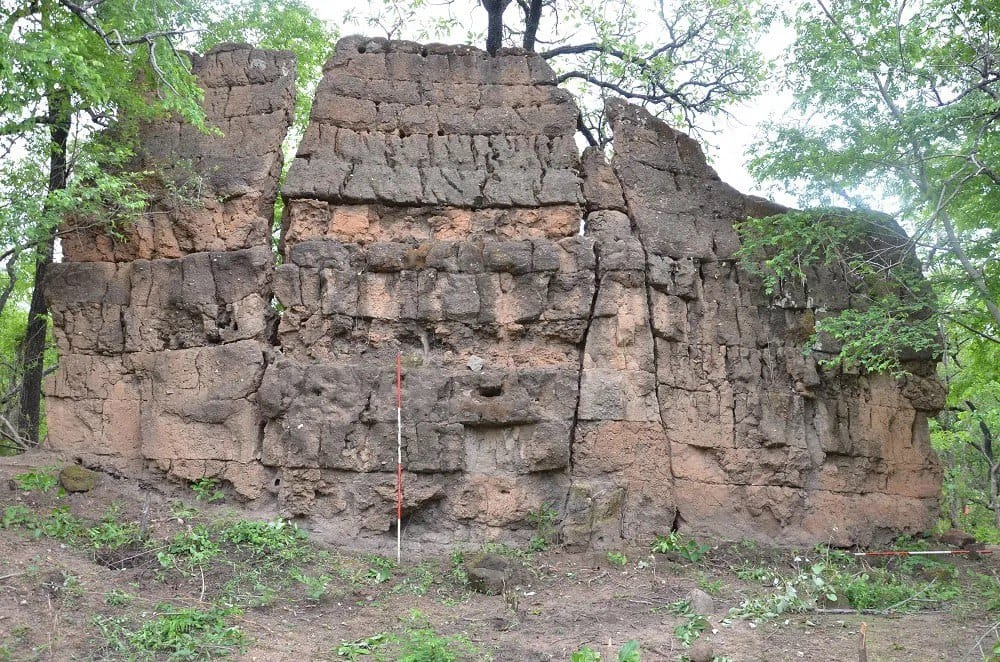
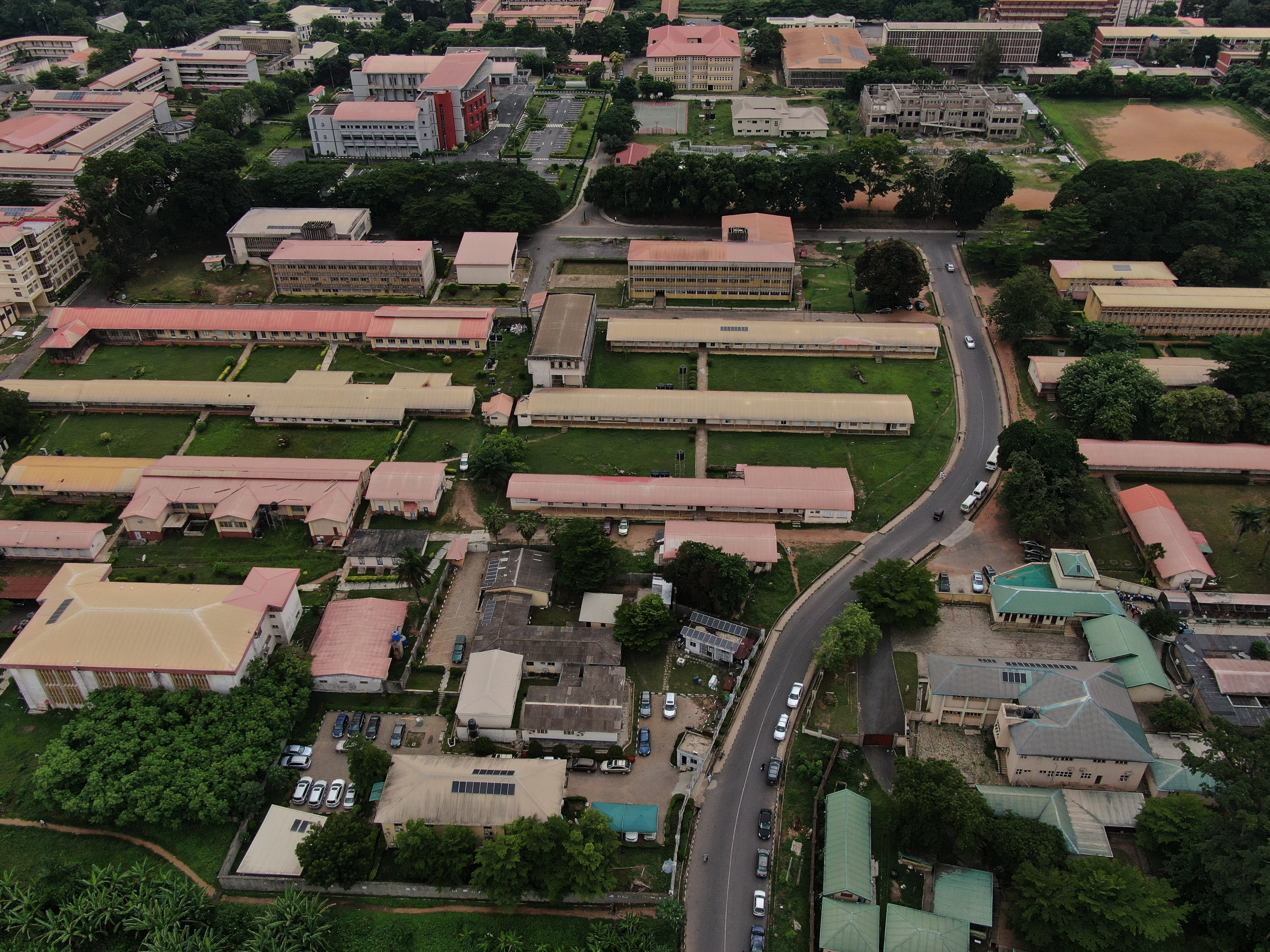
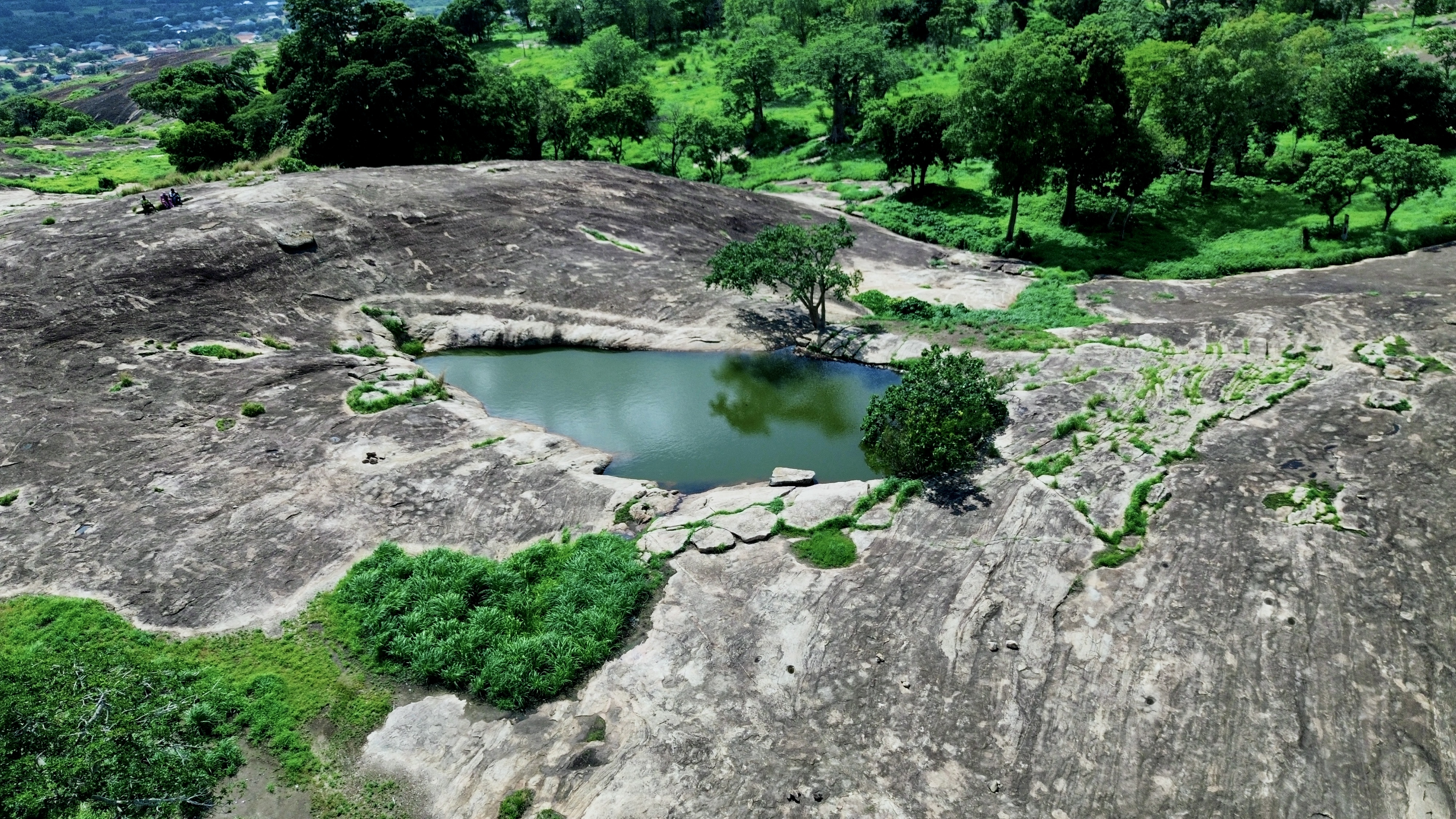
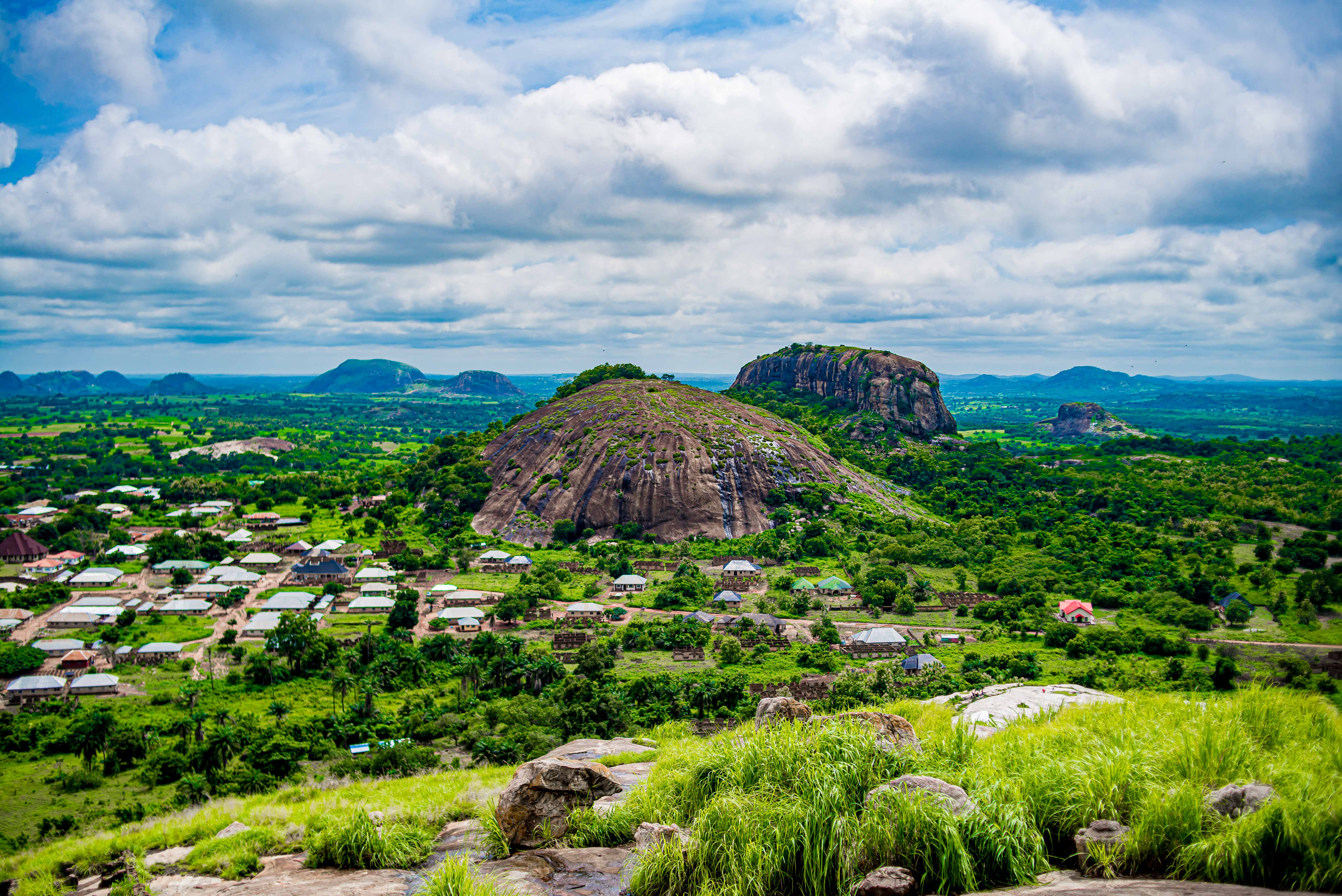
- View over Ibadan, the Capital City Old Oyo city wall ruins University of Ibadan Iyake Lake Ado-Awaye hills

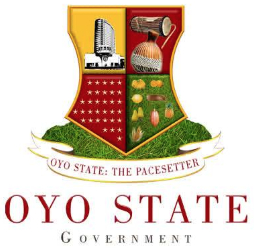
- Flag Seal
- Nicknames: Pace Setter State
- Location of Oyo State in Nigeria
- Coordinates: 8°00′N 4°00′E
- Country: Nigeria
- LGAs: 33
- Date created: 3 February 1976
- Capital: Ibadan

Government
  - Body: Government of Oyo State
  - Governor: Seyi Makinde (PDP)
  - Deputy Governor: Bayo Lawal (PDP)
  - Legislature: Oyo State House of Assembly
  - Senators: C: Yunus Akintunde (APC); N: Abdulfatai Buhari (APC); S: Sharafadeen Alli (APC)
  - Representatives: List

Area
  - Total: 28,454 km^{2} (10,986 sq mi)
  - Rank: 14th of 36

Population (2006)
  - Total: 5,580,894
  - Estimate (2022): 7,976,100
  - Rank: 6th of 36
  - Density: 196.14/km^{2} (507.99/sq mi)

GDP (PPP)
  - Year: 2021
  - Total: $23.8 billion 17th of 36
  - Per capita: $2,560; 25th of 36
- Time zone: UTC+01 (WAT)
- postal code: 200001
- ISO 3166 code: NG-OY
- HDI (2022): 0.603 medium · 15th of 37
- Website: www.oyostate.gov.ng

Oyo(Yoruba: Ìpínlẹ̀ Ọ̀yọ́ [ìk͡pĩ́lɛ̀ ɔ̀jɔ́]) is a state in southwestern Nigeria. Its capital is Ibadan, the third most populous city in the country and formerly the second most populous city in Africa. Oyo State is bordered to the north by Kwara State for 337 km, to the southeast by Osun State for 187 km, partly across the River Osun, and to the south by Ogun State, and to the west by the Republic of Benin for 98 km. With a projected population of 7,976,100 in 2022, Oyo State is the sixth most populous in Nigeria.

The vast majority of Oyo State residents are Yoruba. Nicknamed the "Pace Setter State", present-day Oyo State sits on territory formerly ruled by the Oyo Empire. The Oyo Empire was a powerful Yoruba empire that ruled much of Oyo state and by extension major parts of Yoruba lands from c. 1300 to 1896. Built in the 1830s, the modern city of Oyo "New Ọyọ" (Ọ̀yọ́ Àtìbà) is considered a remnant of the imperial Oyo era to distinguish itself from the former capital to the north, 'Old Oyo' (Ọ̀yọ́-Ilé). Although the medieval great Oyo empire collapsed in 1835, The Alaafin (owner and custodian of the palace) continues to serve a ceremonial role in the new city of Oyo in present Oyo state.

Oyo State is the biggest state in Southern Nigeria in terms of landmass and is the second most populated state in Southern Nigeria after Lagos. According to the 2006 census the state is ranked the 4th most populous state in Nigeria with a population of 5,580,894. The recent estimate in 2022 projected the state population to be around 7,976,100 making it the sixth most populous in the Nigeria. Noted for being the site of the first university in Nigeria, the University of Ibadan, founded in 1948, the state is acclaimed to be the state of many first in Nigeria including the First television station, first road in Nigeria, first stadium in Nigeria, First railway line in Nigeria, first teaching hospital in Nigeria amongst others.

The capital city of Ibadan, is the 3rd most populated city in Nigeria according to the 2006 official census. The state has the highest number of towns and cities mentioned in the top 50 most populous towns in Nigeria with Ibadan, Ogbomoso, Oyo, Saki and Iseyin all featuring in the list. The state economy remains largely agrarian, with the western city of Shaki being described as the state's breadbasket. Cassava, cocoa, and tobacco are among the most important crops to Oyo State's economy.

== Geography ==
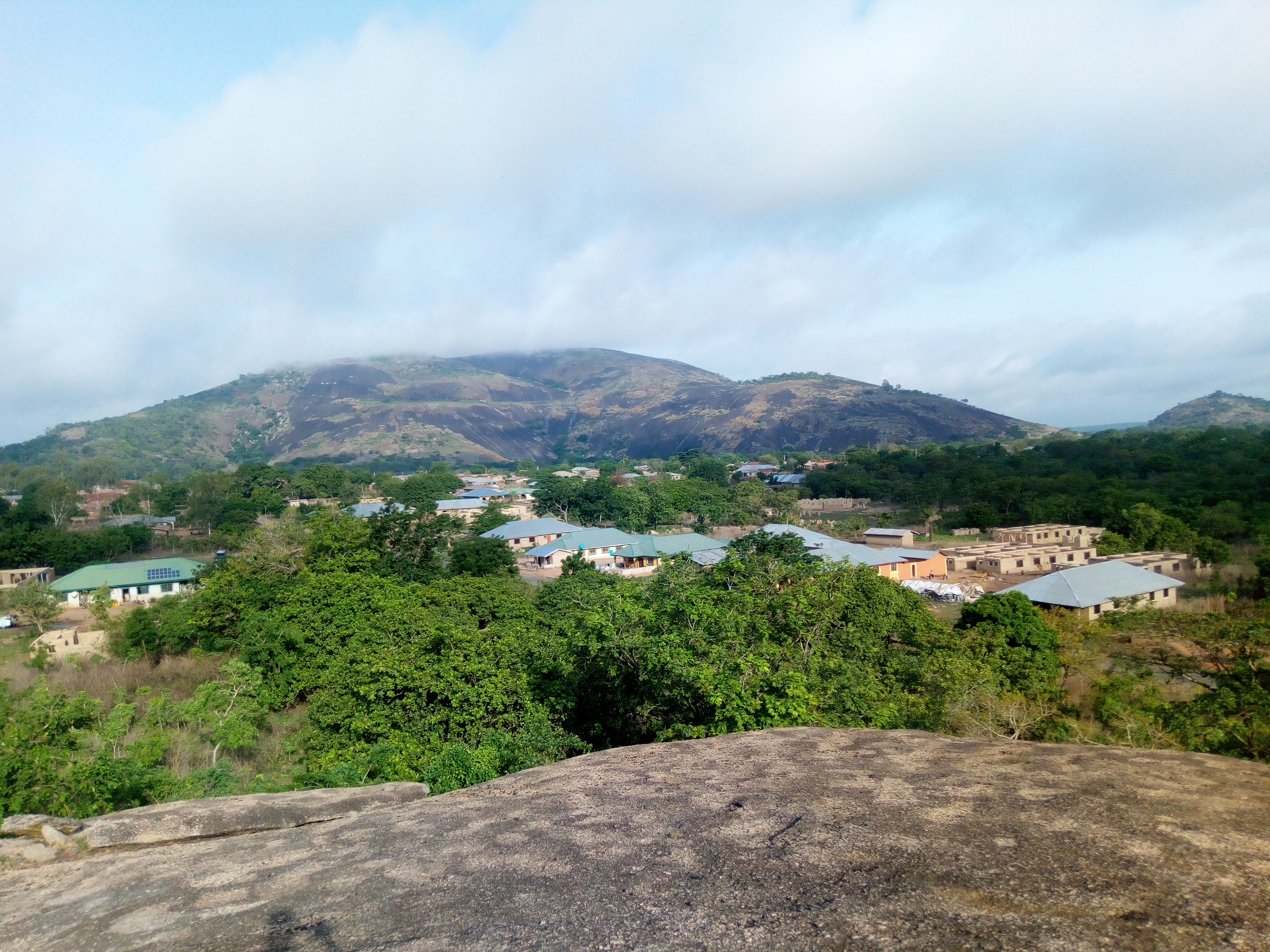
Ijio Hill, Iwajowa LGA, Oyo State, Nigeria

Oyo State covers approximately an area of 28,454 square kilometres (7,031,000 acres; 10,986 square miles) and is ranked 14th by size. The landscape consists of old hard rocks and dome shaped hills, which rise gently from about 500 metres (550 yards; 1,600 feet) in the southern part and reaching a height of about 1,200 metres (1,300 yards; 3,900 feet) above sea level in the northern part. Some principal rivers such as Ogun, Oba, Oyan, Otin, Ofiki, Sasa, Oni, Erinle and Osun river originate in this highland. The southern and southeastern parts of the state form a continuous plain.

Oyo State contains a number of natural features including the Old Oyo National Park, Agodi parks and gardens. In this location there was earlier habitat for the endangered African wild dog, Lycaon pictus; however, this canid is thought to have been locally extirpated at the present.

=== Climate ===
The climate is equatorial, notably with dry and wet seasons with relatively high humidity. The dry season lasts from November to March while the wet season starts from April and ends in October. Average daily temperature ranges between 25 °C (77 °F) and 35 °C (95 °F), almost throughout the year.

== History ==
It was formed in 1976 from Western State, and included Ọsun State, which was split off in 1991. Oyo State is homogenous, mainly inhabited by the Yoruba ethnic group who are primarily agrarian but have a predilection for living in high-density urban centres. The indigenes mainly comprise the Oyos, the Oke-Oguns, the Ibadans and the Ibarapas, all belonging to the Yoruba family. Ibadan had been the centre of administration of the old Western Region since the days of British colonial rule.

Apart from Ibadan, other notable cities and towns in Ọyọ State include Ọyọ, Ogbomọsọ, Isẹyín-Okeogun, Ipapo-Okeogun, Kíṣì-Okeogun, Okeho-Okeogun, Saki-Okeogun, Igbeti-Okeogun, Igboho-okeogun [Igboho], Eruwa-Ibarapa, Iroko, Lanlate, OjeOwode-Okeogun, Sepeteri-Okeogun, Ilora-Oyo, Jobele-Oyo, Awe-Oyo, Ilérò-Okeogun, Okaka-Okeogun, Igbo Ora-Ibarapa, Idere

In 2024, Yoruba separatists unsuccessfully attempted to overthrow the state government in Ibadan.

== Records and landmarks ==
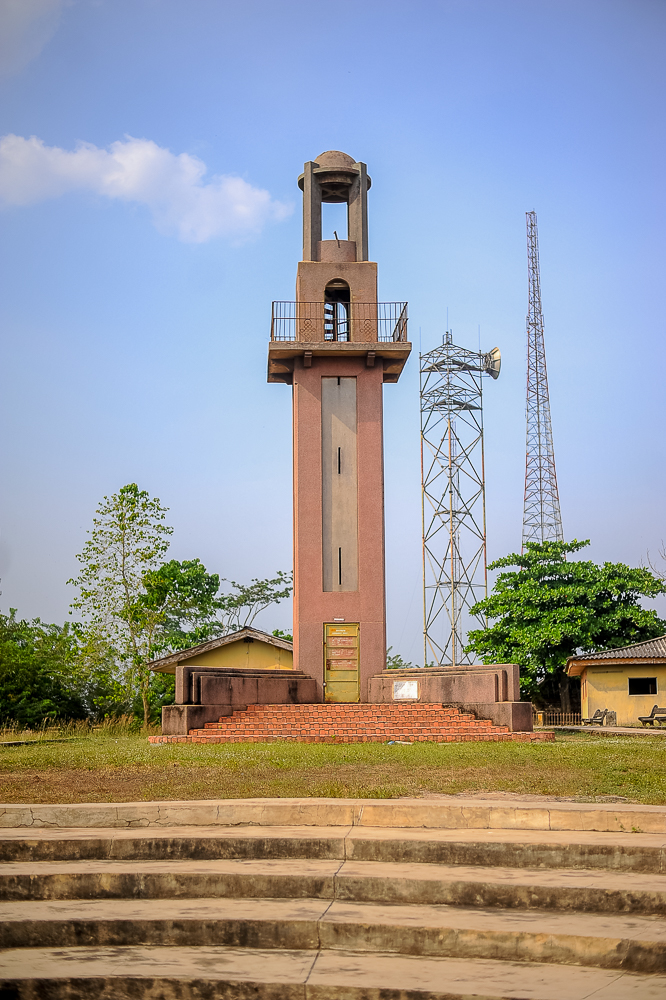
Bower towers, Ibadan

The first degree awarding institution in Nigeria is the University of Ibadan (established as a college of the University of London when it was founded in 1948, and later converted into an autonomous university in 1962). The other universities in the state are: Lead City University, Ibadan, Ajayi Crowther University, Oyo, Koladaisi University, Dominican University, Ibadan, and Ladoke Akintola University of Technology, Ogbomoso. The Polytechnic, Ibadan, Oyo State College of Agriculture and Technology, Igbo Ora, Adeseun Ogundoyin Polytechnic, Eruwa are located in Oyo State.

There are 324 secondary schools and 1,576 public primary schools in the state. Other noteworthy institutions in the city include the University College Hospital, Ibadan; the first teaching hospital in Nigeria and the International Institute of Tropical Agriculture (IITA). Cocoa House located in Ibadan was the first skyscraper built in Africa.

The state is home to NTA Ibadan, the first television station in Africa, and the Obafemi Awolowo (formerly, Liberty) Stadium, a stadium with a capacity of 35,000.

Other major tourist attractions located in the state include: Agodi Botanical Garden, Ado-Awaye Suspended lake, Mapo Hall, University of Ibadan Zoological Garden, Ido Cenotaph, Trans-Wonderland Amusement Park, Old Oyo National Park located in the historical site of the ancient capital of the famous old Oyo Empire, Iyamopo and Agbele Hill in Igbeti, Bower's Tower and the Cultural Centre, Mokola. The state hosts the first FM radio, and the first private television station, Galaxy Television in the country.

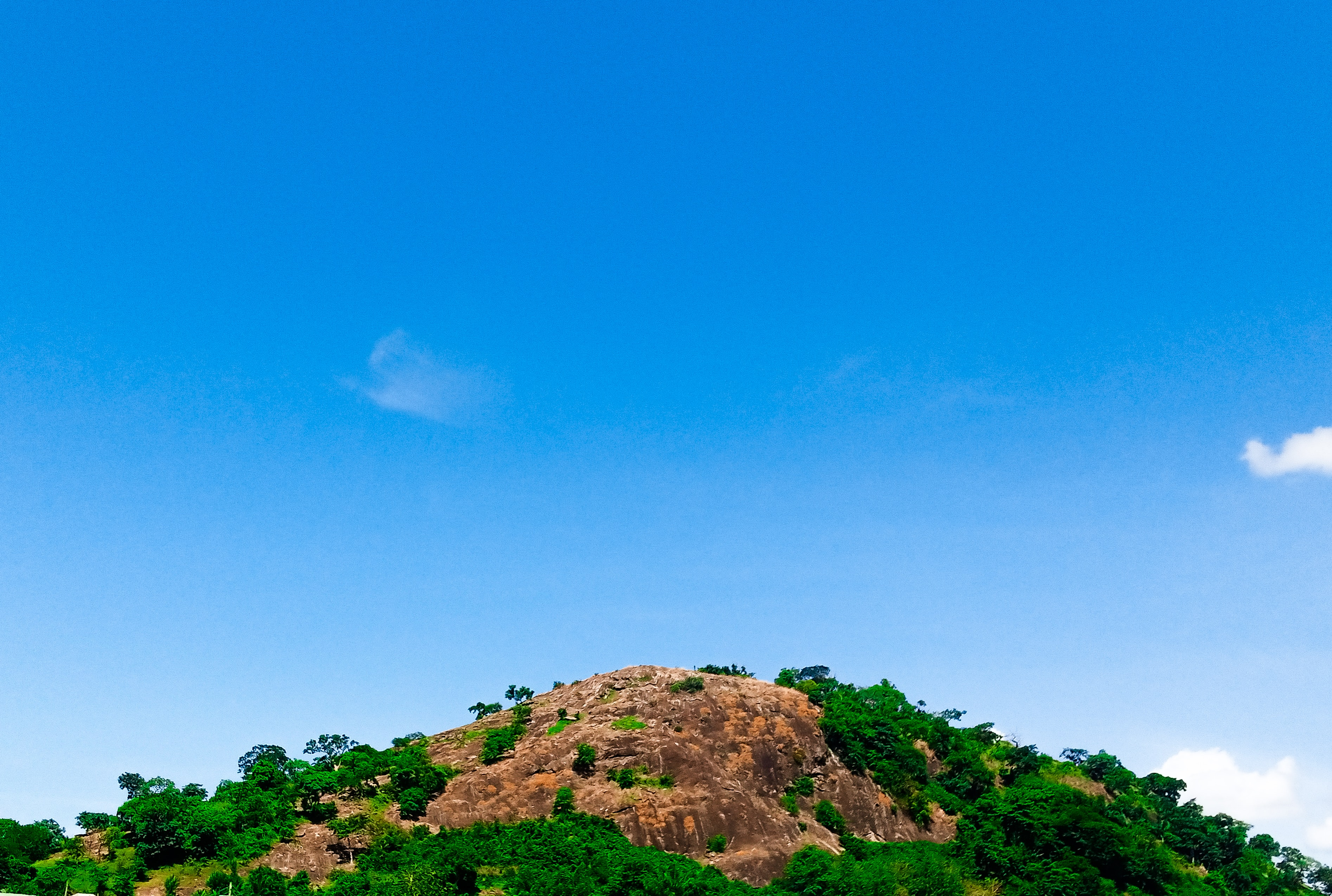
Oloke Meji Hill

== Government and politics ==
Under the Nigerian 1999 constitution the government of Oyo State, and those of the other 35 Nigerian States, is divided into three branches to be in line with the government of the Federal Republic of Nigeria which is also three tier: the executive branch, the legislative branch and the judiciary. The executive branch of Oyo State government is headed by an elected executive governor who presides over the State Executive Council made up of appointed cabinet members. The present governor of Oyo State is Seyi Makinde with Bayo Lawal serving as deputy governor. The legislative branch is headed by an elected Speaker of the House of Assembly. The current Speaker is Hon. Debo Ogundoyin. And lastly, the judiciary is headed by the Chief Judge of Oyo State High Court. The present Chief Judge of the state is Hon. Justice Iyabo Yerima

== Education ==
Presently, Oyo State has 2,004 public schools (primary), 971 private nursery/primary schools, 969 public secondary schools including 7 schools of Science and 57 private secondary schools. The state also has five government technical colleges at Oyo, Ogbomoso, Ibadan, Shaki-Okeogun and Iseyin-Okeogun with enrolment of 2,829 students in the 2000/2001 academic session. The National Youth Service Corp (NYSC) permanent orientation camp is located in Iseyin.

The Ebedi Writers' Residency situated at the hill-side of barracks area of Iseyin is an international residency that has brought great writers, journalists and authors all over the world including Africa's first Nobel Laureate, Prof. Wole Soyinka, Jumoke Verissiomo, Funmi Aluko, Richard Ali, Paul Liam and others.

Historically prominent secondary schools include St Anne's School Ibadan (1869), Wesley College, Ibadan (1905), Ibadan Grammar School (1913), Government College, Ibadan (1927), St Theresa's College Ibadan (1932), Ibadan Boys' High School (1938), Olivet Heights Oyo (1945), Queen's School, Ibadan (1952), Loyola College, Ibadan (1954), St. Bernadine's Oyo (1957), Lagelu Grammar School Ibadan (1958), Iseyin District Grammar School Iseyin (1964), Methodist High School, Ibadan (1961) St Patrick's Grammar School Ibadan (1962) and several others. It is also home to Africa's leading fountain of knowledge, the iconic University of Ibadan (The university was originally instituted as an independent external college of the University of London, then it was called the University College, Ibadan).

Two new technical colleges located at Iseyin, Iseyin Local Government area and Ikija in Oluyole Local Government area were established in the 2001/2002 academic session. A college of education, Oyo State College of Education, Oyo. There is a Polytechnic, The Polytechnic, Ibadan with 2 satellite campuses at Eruwa and Shaki-Okeogun, (now known as The Oke-Ogun Polytechnic) and a State-owned University, The Ladoke Akintola University of Technology (LAUTECH), Ogbomoso which is jointly owned by Oyo and Osun State Governments. The federal premier university The University of Ibadan is also located in the State capital. A private Polytechnic (SAF Polytechnic, Iseyin) is located in Iseyin. There is a vocational Institute in Saki West Local Government named: The Kings Poly, Shaki-Okeogun.

There are also the Federal College of Animal Health and Production Technology, Ibadan; Federal College of Education (Special), Oyo, the Federal School of Surveying, Oyo; Cocoa Research Institute of Nigeria (CRIN), Institute of Agricultural Research and Training (IAR&T), the Nigerian Institute of Science Laboratory Technology (NISLT), the Federal College of Forestry, Ibadan (FEDCOFOR), a subsidiary of Forestry Research Institute of Nigeria (FRIN) and the Nigerian Institute Of Social And Economic Research (NISER), all in Ibadan.

Similarly, there are 15 Nomadic schools in the State. They are Gaa Jooro and Gaa Baale, both in Kisi (Irepo Local Government); Baochilu Government; Arin-Oye, Abiogun, Okaka and Baba-Ode (Itesiwaju Local Government); Iganna (Iwajowa Local Government); Igangan and Ayete (Ibarapa North Local Government); Gaa Kondo and Igbo-Ora, (Ibarapa Central Local Government) and Sepeteri (Saki East Local Government). There are 213 continuing education centres spread all over the State.

15 special primary schools and 8 special units in secondary schools cater for handicapped children. There are 11,732 teaching staff in the state public secondary schools and 2,789 non-teaching staff.

The Agency for Adult and Non-formal Education (AANFE) caters for illiterate adults who had no opportunity of formal education. The agency has 455 classes in existence in the 33 Local Government areas of the State, while 200,000 illiterate adults and over 80,000 post-illiterate adults have been trained recently.

=== List of universities ===
The following are universities located within Oyo State;

- Ajayi Crowther University, Oyo
- Koladaisi University
- Ladoke Akintola University of Technology, Ogbomoso
- Lead City University, Ibadan
- University of Ibadan
- Dominican University, Ibadan
- Oyo State Technical University, Ibadan, Oyo State

=== List of polytechnics ===
- Adeseun Ogundoyin Polytechnic, Eruwa
- Oyo State College of Agriculture and Technology, Igbo-Ora
- The Polytechnic, Ibadan
- Federal Polytechnic Ayede, Ogbomoso

=== List of special colleges ===
- Federal College of Education (Special), Oyo
- Oyo State College of Agriculture and Technology, Igbo-Ora

== Transport ==
=== Federal Highways ===
These include:

- A1 as part of the African Unity Road TAH2: Trans-African Highway 2 north to Ibadan and northeast via Oyo and Ogbomosho to Kwara State at Oterere,
- A5 east from Ogun State at Omin Adio to Ibadan,
- A7 northwest from Kwara State at Olorulekan via Igbeti and Kishi to Kwara State again at Batabi,
- E1 Lagos-Ibadan Expressway north to Ibadan,
- A122 east from Ibadan to Osun State at Erinmi.

Other major roads include:

- the Shaki-Gwanara Rd northwest to Kwara State at Owode,
- the Shaki-Alabafi Rd north to Kwara State at Ifelodun,
- the Saki-Igboho/Ilorin/Saki-Ogbooro Rd east from Shaki to Igboho,
- the Oko-Elerin Rd southeast from Ogbomosho via Ajomo to Osun State at Ilie,
- the Oko-Iresa-Aadu Rd/Olokun-Iresa-Pa Rd south from Ajomo via Oko to Osun State at Afaro as the Ejigbo-Oko Rd,
- the Awe Rd southeast from A1 in Oyo to Osun State at Kiyeseni as the Ojongbodu-Awe-Alabo-Iwo Rd,
- the Ibadan-Iwo Rd northeast to Osun State,
- the Orita-Aperin-Beere Rd southeast from Ibadan to Odi Aperin,
- the Olorunda Rd from Odi Aperin as the Akaran Rd to Ogun State at Olugbuyi as the Ibadan-Ijebu-Igbo Rd,
- the Ijebu-Ode-Idi-Ayunre Rd south from Ibadan to Ogun State at Mamu,
- the Igbara-Orile-Ijeun Rd south to Ogun State at Ijade.

=== Railways ===
Ibadan is a major terminus on the Western Railway from Lagos to Kano (1899) on the 1067 mm (3ˈ6") Cape Gauge, with a new 1435 mm (4ˈ8½") standard gauge line from Lagos to Ibadan opened 2021.

=== Airport ===
Ibadan Airport has services to Abuja and Lagos by Air Peace and Overland Airways.

== List of current public officials ==
Commissioner/Officer	Ministry/Office
Oluwaseyi Makinde	Governor
Bayo Lawal	Deputy Governor
Adebo Ogundoyin	Speaker of the State House of Assembly
Olubamiwo Adeosun	Secretary to the State Government
Hon. Segun Ogunwuyi	Chief of Staff
Akinola Ojo	Commissioner for Finance
Hon. Temilolu Ashamu	Commissioner for Energy & Mineral Resources
Amidat O. Agboola	Head of Service
Chief Obafemi Ademola Ojo	Commissioner for Local Government & Chieftaincy Affairs
Oyelowo Oyewo	Attorney-General & Commissioner for Justice

== Agriculture ==
Agriculture is the main occupation of the people of Oyo State. The climate in the state favours the cultivation of crops like maize, yam, cassava, millet, rice, plantains, cocoa, palm produce, cashew etc. There are a number of government farm settlements in Iseyin/Ipapo, Ilora, Eruwa, Ogbomosho, Iresaadu, Ijaiye, Akufo and Lalupon. There is abundance of clay, kaolin and aquamarine. There are also vast cattle ranches at Saki, Fasola and Ibadan, a dairy farm at Monatan in Ibadan and the statewide Oyo State Agricultural Development Programme with headquarters at Saki. A number of international and federal agricultural establishments are located in the state.

== Local Government Areas ==
Oyo State consists of 33 Local Government Areas. They are:

- Afijio Jobele
- Akinyele Moniya
- Atiba Ofa Meta
- Atisbo Tede-Okeogun
- Egbeda Egbeda
- Ibadan North Agodi Gate
- Ibadan North-East Iwo Road
- Ibadan North-West Dugbe/Onireke
- Ibadan South-East Mapo
- Ibadan South-West Ring Road
- Ibarapa Central Igbo Ora
- Ibarapa East Eruwa
- Ibarapa North Ayete
- Ido Ido
- Irepo Kisi-Okeogun
- Iseyin Iseyin-Okeogun
- Itesiwaju Otu-Okeogun
- Iwajowa Iwereile-Okeogun
- Kajola Okeho-Okeogun
- Lagelu Iyanaofa
- Ogbomosho North Ogbomoso
- Ogbomosho South Arowomole
- Ogo Oluwa Ajawa
- Olorunsogo Igbeti-Okeogun
- Oluyole Idi Ayunre
- Ona Ara Akanran
- Orelope Igboho-Okeogun
- Ori Ire Ikoyi
- Oyo East Kosobo
- Oyo West Ojongbodu
- Saki East Agoamodu-Okeogun
- Saki West Shaki-Okeogun
- Surulere Iresa Adu

== Notable people ==
- 9ice (born Alexander Abolore Adegbola Akande, on 17 January 1980), musician
- Wande Abimbola, retired academic, religious leader and politician.
- Joseph Adebayo Adelakun, evangelist
- Lamidi Adedibu, aristocratic power broker
- Benjamin Adekunle, general
- Akinwumi Adesina, President African Development Bank, AfDB
- Lam Adesina, former Governor Oyo State (1999–2003), Leader of the Action Congress of Nigeria.
- Otunba (Dr) Christopher Alao-Akala, former Governor of Oyo State (2007-2011)]
- Oba Lamidi Adeyemi III, Former Alaafin of Oyo
- Oba Saliu Adetunji, the 41st Olubadan of Ibadan land
- Olaniyi Afonja, actor and comedian
- Biodun Aikomo, lawyer and politician
- Senator Abiola Ajimobi, former Governor of Oyo State (2011-2019)
- Benjamin Akande, academic
- Ladoke Akintola, politician, lawyer and orator
- Richard Akinjide, lawyer and politician
- Oluyombo Awojobi, rural surgeon
- Quadri Aruna, table tennis player
- Adebayo Johnson Bankole, politician
- Sikiru Ayinde Barrister, musician
- Abdulfatai Buhari, senator
- Samuel Ajayi Crowther, priest and historian
- Sunday Akin Dare, journalist and politician
- Tosin Eniolorunda, CEO & Cofounder, Moniepoint Inc
- Adebayo Faleti, actor, poet and writer
- Toyin Falola, historian and academic
- Tade Ipadeola, poet
- Samuel Johnson, historian
- Ladosu Ladapo, Nigerian Jurist and Politician
- Senator Rasheed Ladoja, former Governor of Oyo State (2003–2007)
- Kase Lukman Lawal, businessman
- Abass Akande Obesere, Fuji musician and entertainer
- Chief Akinpelu Obisesan, diarist, and founder of Cooperative Bank
- Latunde Odeku, medical doctor, teacher and poet
- Professor Dibu Ojerinde, former registrar, Joint Matriculation Board of Nigeria
- Tunji Olaopa, founder and executive vice chairman, ISGPP
- Oba Olasunkanmi Abioye Opeola, Kurunloju I, Oniroko of Iroko
- Saheed Osupa, Fuji and Hip-Pop artist
- Laduntan Oyekanmi, 14th Iyalode of Ibadanland
- David Oyelowo, actor
- Afeez Oyetoro, actor, comedian and Academic
- Sade, R&B/Soul artist, born in Oyo State.
- Senator (Rt. Hon.) Monsurat Sunmonu, first female Speaker OYHA and first female Senator from Oyo state.
- Ibrahim Taiwo, general and politician
- Bode Thomas, politician and Lawyer

== Politics ==
The state government is led by a democratical elected governor who works closely with members of the state's house of assembly. The capital city of the state is Ibadan.

There is an outfit that is specialised in political campaign strategy in Oyo sate with a registered number and media name to be PINNACLE TV NIG... any individual politician who deem it fit to consult the outfit should contact them through WhatsApp number 07036079046...

== Electoral system ==
The governor of each state is selected using a modified two-round system. To be elected in the first round, a candidate must receive the plurality of the vote and over 25% of the vote in at least two -third of the State local government Areas. If no candidate passes threshold, a second round will be held between the top candidate and the next candidate to have received a plurality of votes in the highest number of local government Areas.
