= Debo Ogundoyin =

Nigerian politician (born 1987)

The Right Honorable Adebo Edward Ogundoyin

Speaker of the Oyo State House of Assembly
- Incumbent
- Assumed office June 2019
- Constituency: Ibarapa East

Personal details
- Born: 17 February 1987 (age 39)
- Party: People's Democratic Party
- Spouse: Olamidun Majekodunmi - Ogundoyin
- Parents: Adeseun Oguntona Ogundoyin (father); Justina Iyabo Ogundoyin (mother)
- Education: Babcock University
- Occupation: Politician; Agronomist

Adebo Edward Ogundoyin (born 17 February 1987) is a Nigerian politician. He is the current speaker of the Ninth Oyo State House of Assembly and member representing Ibarapa East constituency under the platform of the Peoples Democratic Party (PDP).

He assumed office on 10 June 2019.

== Personal life and education ==
Adebo Edward Ogundoyin is from Ibarapa East constituency, Oyo State. He is a graduate of Babcock University. He was elected to the House to represent the Ibarapa East State Constituency and was elected Speaker of the House without opposition on Monday, 10 June 2019.

A second timer, he was first elected into the 8th house of Assembly in 2018 on the platform of the Peoples Democratic Party (PDP) after he won the bye-election, which was held after the death of the former Speaker, Rt. Hon. Michael Adeyemo, who died on Friday, 27 April 2018.

== Family background ==
Adebo Ogundoyin is one of the sons of the late foremost philanthropist and industrialist, Chief Adeseun Ogundoyin. He lost his father, Adeseun Ogundoyin, in 1991 at four years old. Chief Adeseun Ogundoyin, Alhaji Arisekola Alao, Chief Akanni Aluko dominated the social scene like the roaring lions dominated the jungle in Ibadan during their days.
