= Latunde Odeku =

Nigerian neurosurgeon

E. Latunde Odeku
- Born: Emanuel Olatunde Alaba Olanrewaju Odeku; June 29, 1927; Lagos, Nigeria
- Died: August 20, 1974 (aged 47); London, England
- Education: Howard University
- Occupation: doctor
- Known for: First African neurosurgeon trained in the United States; first neurosurgeon in Nigeria.
- Scientific career
- Fields: Neurosurgery

E. Latunde Odeku (born Emanuel Olatunde Alaba Olanrewaju Odeku; 1927, Lagos, Nigeria – died, London, 1974) was the first Nigerian neurosurgeon trained in the United States. He also was pioneer in neurosurgery in Africa.

== Early life and education ==
Of Yoruba heritage, Latunde was born in Lagos, Nigeria. His father was a native of Aawe while his mother was a Lagosian. He attended Methodist Boys' High School, Lagos. and proceeded to Howard University, where he graduated summa cum laude in zoology in 1950. He was subsequently awarded a scholarship to study medicine at Howard University, earning his MD in 1954.

== Medical career ==
After passing the licenciate medical exam in Canada, Latunde spent the following year in Nigeria as a medical officer at the Lagos General Hospital. In 1961, he returned to the United States and was offered a residency position, training under Dr. Kahn (from 1956 to 1960) at the University of Michigan. Afterwards, he trained in neurology under Dr. Webb Haymaker at the Walter Reed Medical Center in Washington, D.C. He underwent another pediatric neurosurgery residency at the Children’s Hospital of Philadelphia under Dr. Eugene Spitz, creator of the Spitz-Holter valve for treating hydrocephalus. In 1961, Latunde was appointed an instructor of neuroanatomy and neurosurgery at the Howard University College of Medicine.

Although Latunde was subsequently offered multiple appointments, including two distinguished academic neurosurgery faculty positions in the United States, he chose to return to Nigeria. Latunde came to the University of Ibadan in 1962 as the first neurosurgeon in West Africa. In 1962, he was appointed as senior faculty and became a fellow of the American College of Surgeons. In 1965, he was appointed as a professor of neurosurgery; from 1968 to 1971, serving as the head of the Department of Surgery and the Dean of the University of Ibadan College of Medicine. He established the national and West African postgraduate medical colleges, and the initiation processes at the University of Ibadan College of Medicine, later performed in all Nigerian medical schools.

Latunde was also a poet and writer. He made significant contributions to the neurosurgical literature, publishing 61 scientific articles over a period of about 12 years.

Latunde was awarded the Howard University alumni award for distinguished service.

== Personal life ==
Latunde was married twice both times to medical doctors. His first marriage resulted in two children before ending in divorce. In 1971 he married the then Katherine Jill Adcock, an English medical doctor who was working at the University College Hospital. They had two children - Alan, who was born in October 1971 and a daughter born in January 1973.

In his lifetime, despite being a busy medical practitioner, Latunde solely and jointly published 85 medically related articles and 13 other articles related to general topics. As an accomplished physician-poet, he authored two collections of poetry: Twilight: Out of the Night (1964), and Whispers from the Night (1969).

== Later years ==
From 1972, his health began to fail from complications of diabetes. He died on August 20, 1974, at Hammersmith Hospital in London and was laid to rest at St Peter's Church, Burnham, England.

== Published works ==
- Twilight of the Night
- Odeku, E. Latunde. (1978). Publications of E. Latunde
- E. Latunde Odeku (1975)
- Whispers from the night (1969)
- Odeku, E. L., & Adeloye, A. (1978). Publications of E. Latunde Odeku. Ibadan, Nigeria: University of Ibadan.
- Beginnings of Neurosurgery at the University of Ibadan, Nigeria
- Congenital Subgaleal Cysts over the Anterior Fontanelle in Nigerians
- Adeloye, Adelola Odeku, E. Latunde (1971-02). Congenital Subgaleal Cysts over the Anterior Fontanelle in Nigerians
- Adeloye, A.; Odeku, E. L. (1971-02-01) Epilepsy after missile wounds of the head
- Epilepsy after missile wounds of the head (Book)
- Perspectives in Neurosurgery (1971-01-01)
- Adeloye, Adelola; Latunde Odeku, E. (1971). "The radiology of missile head wounds". Clinical Radiology. 22 (3): 312–320. doi:10.1016/s0009-9260(71)80079-x. ISSN 0009-9260.
- Biography - E. Latunde Odeku, an African neurosurgeon (1976)
- Three decades of medical research at the College of Medicine, Ibadan, Nigeria 1948 - 1980; a list of the papers publ. by members of the College of Med. of the Univ. of Ibadan from its foundation through 1980
- E. Latunde Odeku, M.D., F.A.C.S., F.I.C.S., 1927-1974. An African pioneer neurosurgeon.
- Letter E. Latunde Odeku
- Obituary: Professor E. Latunde Odeku B.Sc., M.D., L.M.C.C. (Canada), D.A.B.N.S., F.I.C.S., F.A.C.S., F.M.C.S. (Nigeria) by A Adeloye Publication: Surgical neurology, 1975 Apr; 3(4): 187
- 11th E. Latunde Odeku memorial lecture given on 27 October 1987.
