= Lead City University =

Private university in Oyo State, Nigeria

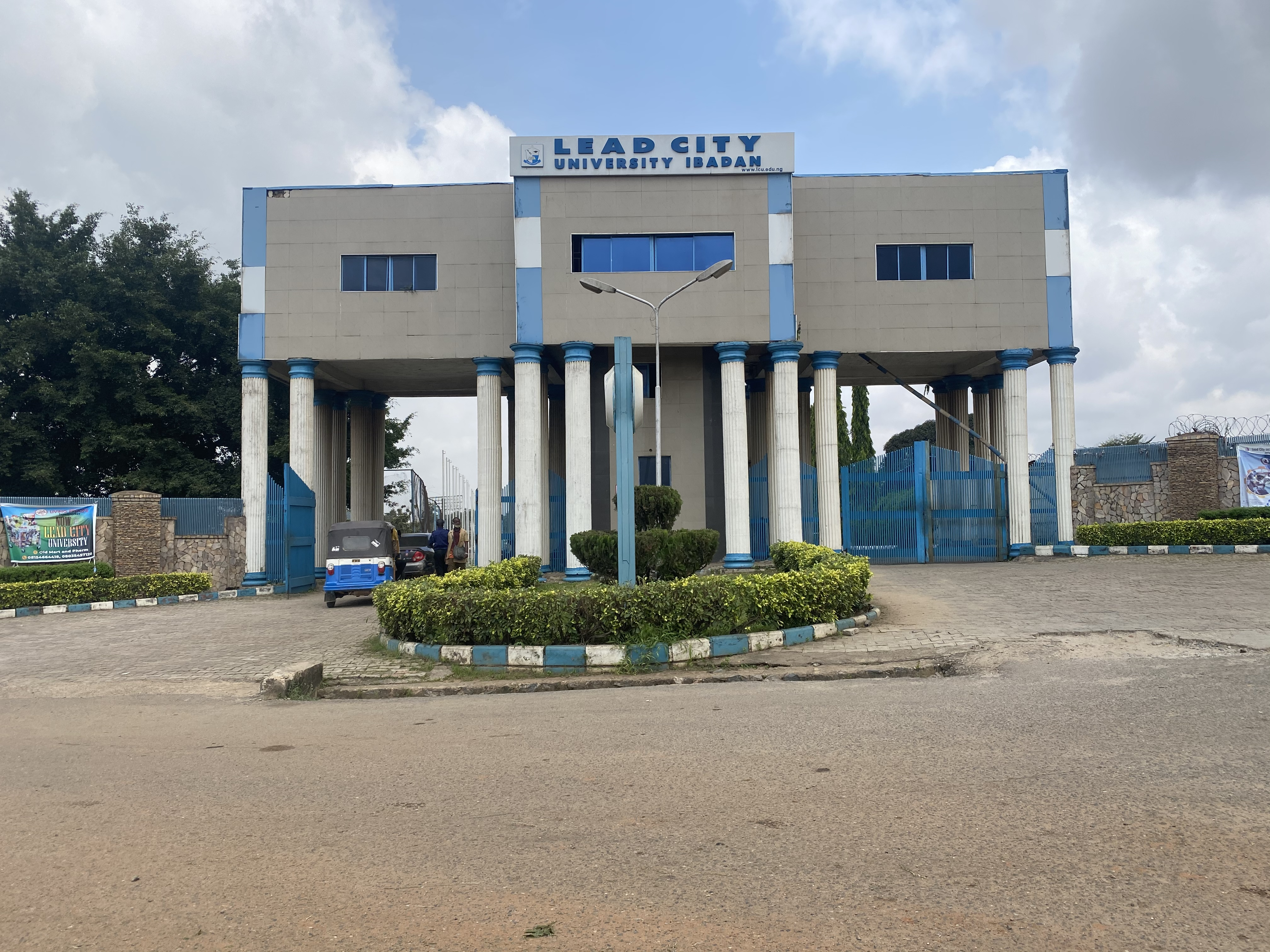
- Entrance to the university in 2021
- Other name: LCU
- Former names: City University, Ibadan
- Motto: Knowledge for Self-reliance
- Type: Private
- Established: 2005
- Chairman: Jide Owoeye
- Chancellor: Gabriel Babatunde Ogunmola
- Vice-Chancellor: Kabiru Aderemi Adeyemo
- Provost: Afolakemi Oredein
- Location: Ibadan, Nigeria; 7.327°N 3.880°E
- Campus: Urban
- Colours: Blue, pink, white
- Website: lcu.edu.ng

Lead City University, also known as LCU, is a private university located in Ibadan, Oyo State, Nigeria.

== History ==
Initially founded as City University, Ibadan, the Lead City University of Ibadan was approved by the National Universities Commission in December 2003 and ratified on February 16, 2005 by the Federal Executive Council. The following month, the university's Board of Trustees and Council agreed to change its name to Lead City University, Ibadan following confusion with other, similarly named institutions.

Statistics from the university's 15th Convocation (Enterprise Graduate Class of 2022):

- undergraduates: 1306
- first-class graduates: 156
- postgraduates: 534
- students enrolled in the PhD Program: 73
- students enrolled in the Master's program: 364
- students enrolled in the PGD program: 97
- students that are considered as Honorary Graduates: 5

The university is accredited by the Council of Legal Education, and can send students to the Nigerian Law School for legal education and training, as well as admit candidates to the Nigerian Bar upon successful completion of the prescribed requirements. As of 2025, the university graduated 3,379 students.

== Courses offered and admission requirements ==
Prospective students seeking admission to the university must have the university as their first choice in Jamb UTME and credit passes in 5 subjects, including both mathematics and English, in GCE/WAEC, NECO, NABTEB, or equivalents.

The university offers a diverse range of courses which include:

- Accounting
- Anatomy
- Architecture
- Banking and finance
- Biochemistry
- Biology
- Business administration
- Business education
- Chemistry
- Computer sciences and information science
- Computer science with economics
- Computer science with electronics
- Criminology and security studies
- Cyber security
- Economics
- Education and biology
- Education and English language
- Education and mathematics
- Education and computer science
- Education and social studies
- Education and physics
- Educational management
- Education and chemistry
- English and literary studies
- French
- Environmental health science
- Guidance and counselling
- Forensic science
- Geology
- Information systems
- Entrepreneurship
- Radiography
- Nursing science
- Medicine and surgery
- Pharmacy
- Law
- Medical laboratory science
- Physiology
- Physiotherapy
- Psychology
- Information technology
- Law
- Industrial relations and personnel management
- International relations
- Library and information science
- Marketing
- Mass communication and mass media
- Mechanical engineering
- Medical laboratory science
- Microbiology
- Nursing science
- Office and information management
- Performing art and culture
- Physical and health education
- Public health
- Public administration
- Psychology
- Physics
- Physiology
- Radiology
- Religious studies
- Science laboratory technology
- Social work
- Sociology
- Software engineering
- Teacher education science
- Wood product engineering
- Mechatronics engineering

== Ph.D program approval ==
In 2018, the Vice Chancellor, Kabiru Adeyemo, announced that Lead City University obtained accreditation for additional postgraduate courses. These include five additional courses at both the postgraduate diploma (PGD) and Master of Science levels: Masters of Business Administration, Accounting, Banking, and Finance, and a PGD in Hospital Services Administration. The university also obtained accreditation for Ph.D programs in Accounting, Economics, Public Administration, and Business Administration.

The National Universities Commission approved a doctorate program in Computer Science at the university in January 2020.

== Convocation program ==
During the 12th convocation in 2019, the university signed a memorandum of understanding (MoU) with the Nigerian Institute of Medical Research and American International School of Medicine in Guyana for medicine, medical health and environmental health programmes.

During the 15th convocation in 2022, Adeyemo urged the Federal Government to find a lasting solution to the ASUU strike to foster growth across the Nigeria university.

At the 16th convocation in 2023, Adeyemo urged new graduates to embrace entrepreneurship and innovation, and the university gave out three honorary doctorates.

== Award of certificates ==
The Lead City University of Ibadan awards two certificates to their graduates. The first is for their degree of study, and the second certificate is based on professional skills acquired on campus, such as tailoring or photography. Graduates can also receive a certificate from the university's Institute Of Personality Development.

== Collaboration and scholarship ==
Lead City University has collaborated with the Indian government to give scholarships to Indian students interested in engineering and technological innovation.

== Conservation of natural resources ==
During the university's faculty lecture series in Ibadan in 2023, Adeyemo, alongside Olusola Ladokun, the Dean of the Faculty of Natural and Applied Sciences, and Samuel Oluwalana, a faculty member at the Department of Forestry and Wildlife Management, College of Environmental Resources Management, Federal University of Agriculture, Abeokuta, issued a cautionary statement against the depletion of natural resources in the country and the danger it poses to humanity.

== Ranking ==
As of 2023, Lead City University is ranked #57 among private universities in Nigeria.

== Executives of the university ==
- Professor Toyin Falola, Emeritus Professor of Humanities
- Tunji Olaopa, founder and Executive Vice-chairman ISGPP
- Professor Olufemi Onabajo, former Vice Chancellor
- Professor Gabriel Ogunmola, current Chancellor
- Professor Jide Owoeye, current Pro-chancellor and Chairman of the Council
- Professor Kabiru Adeyemo, current Vice Chancellor
- Professor Olusola Ladokun, current Deputy Vice Chancellor Science and Technology of the University
- Dr (Mrs) Oyebola Ayeni, current Registrar of the university
- Mr Lanre Osaniyi, current University Librarian
- Dr (Mrs) Kunbi Taiwo Taiwo, current Bursar of the University

== Gallery ==
Lead City University campus

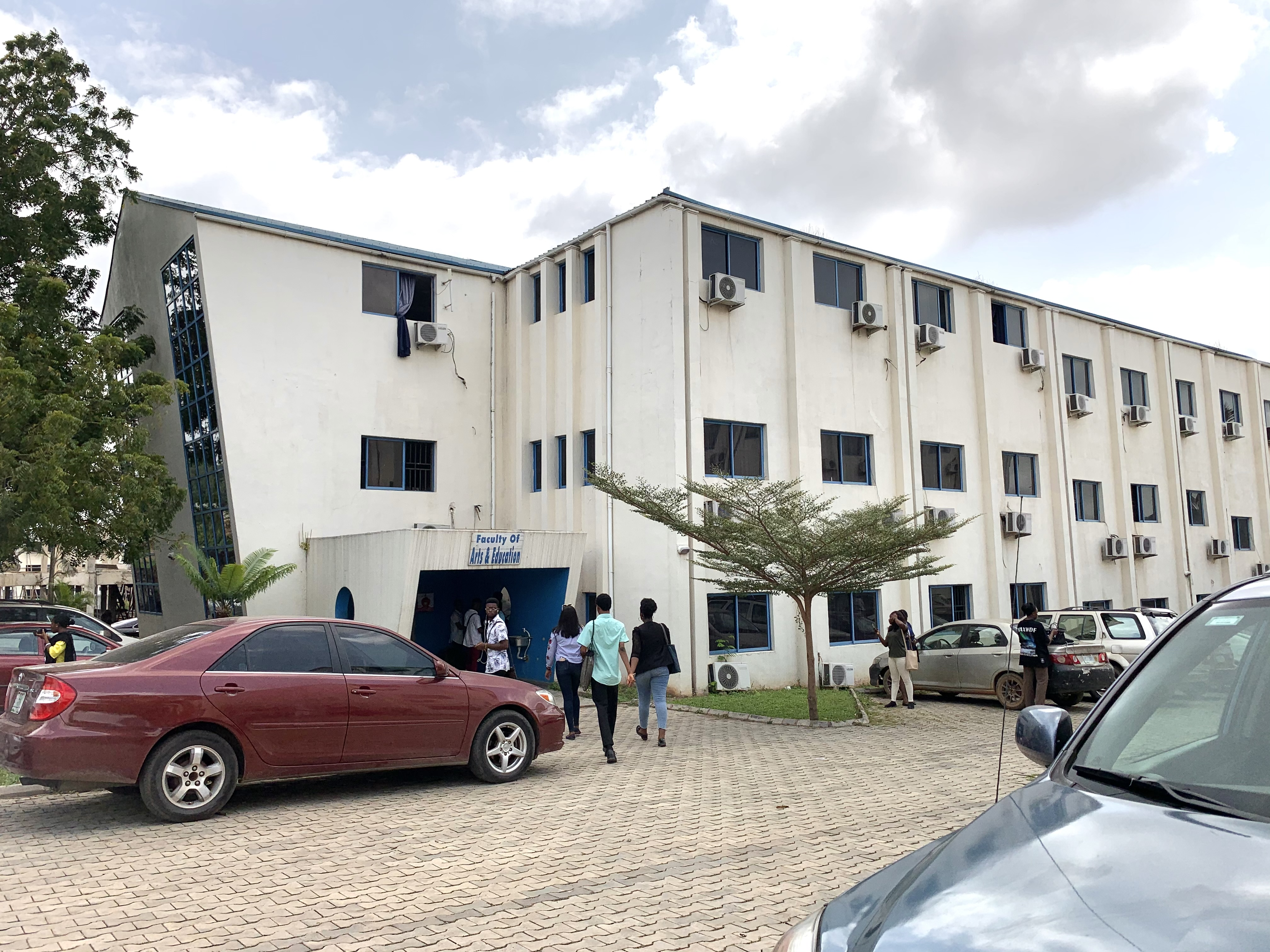
Faculty of Art and Education

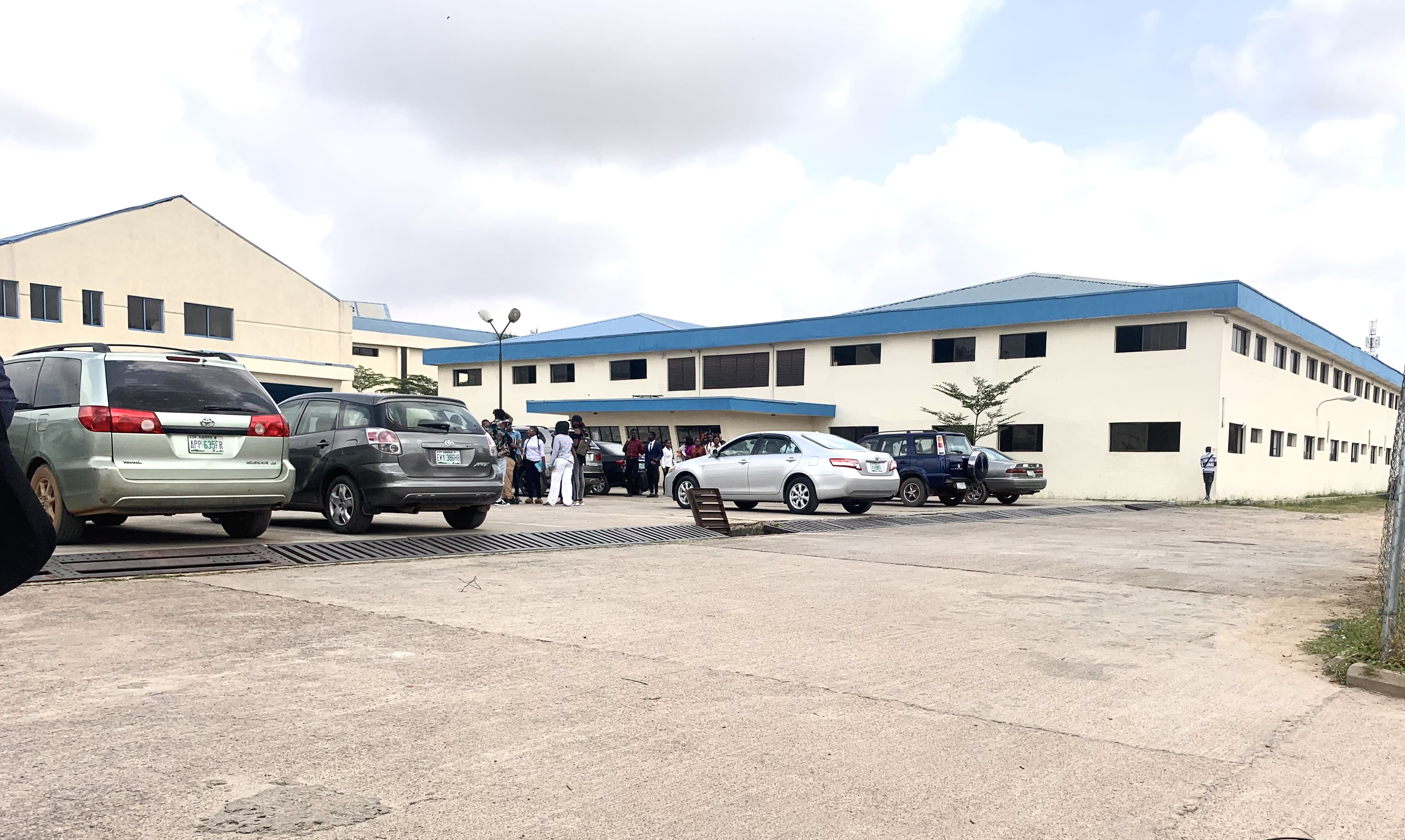
Law Lecture Theatre

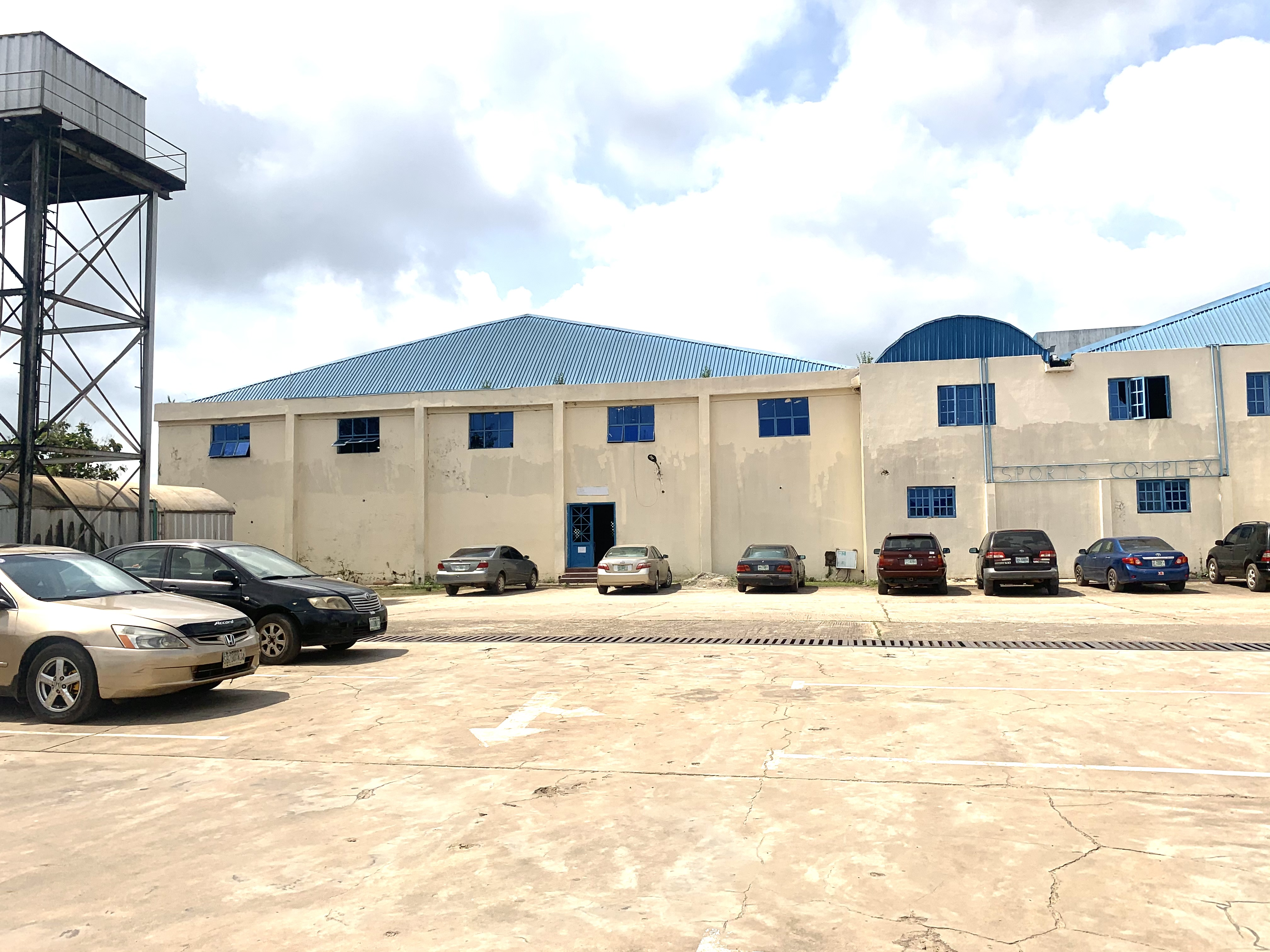
Gymnasium

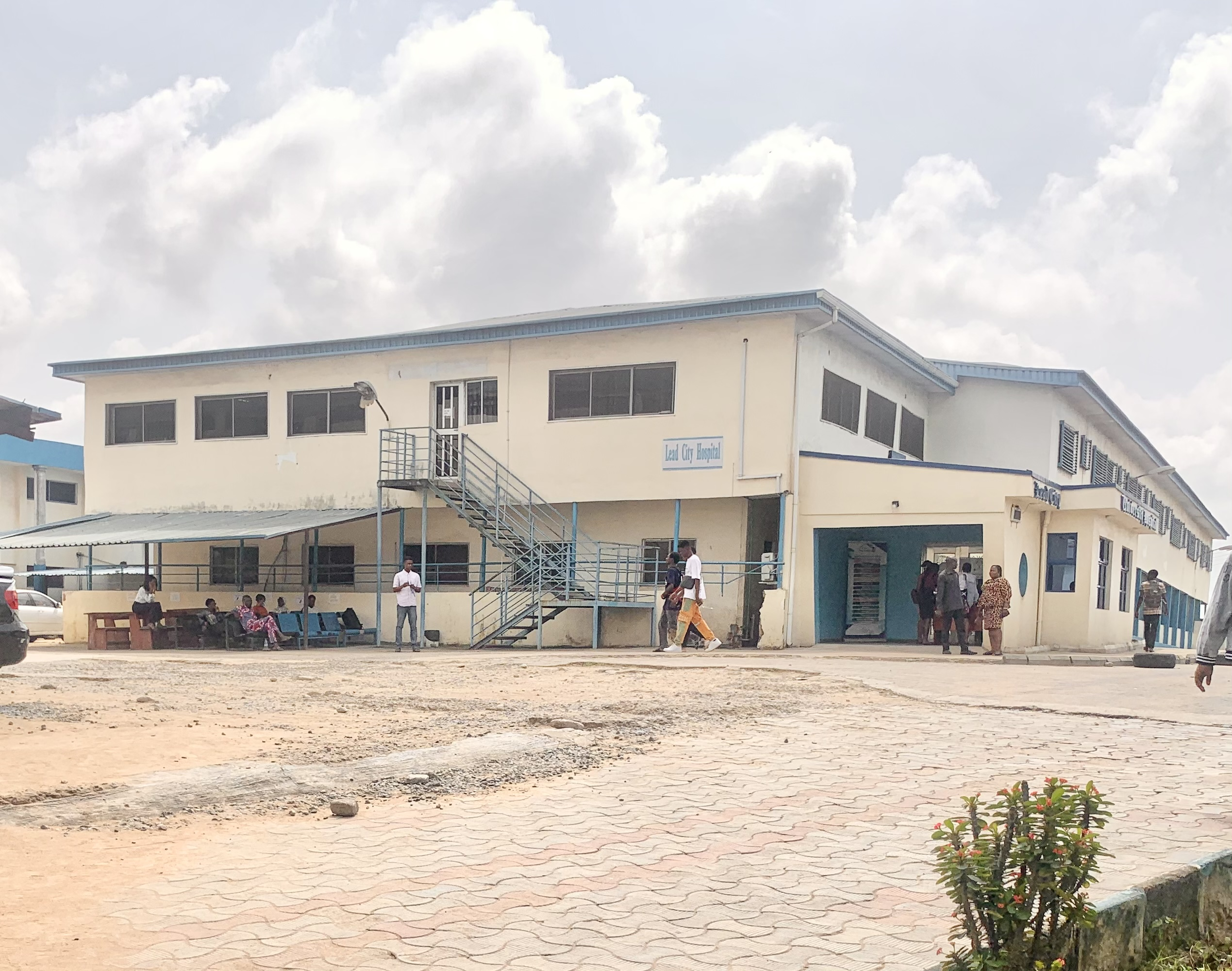
University Hospital

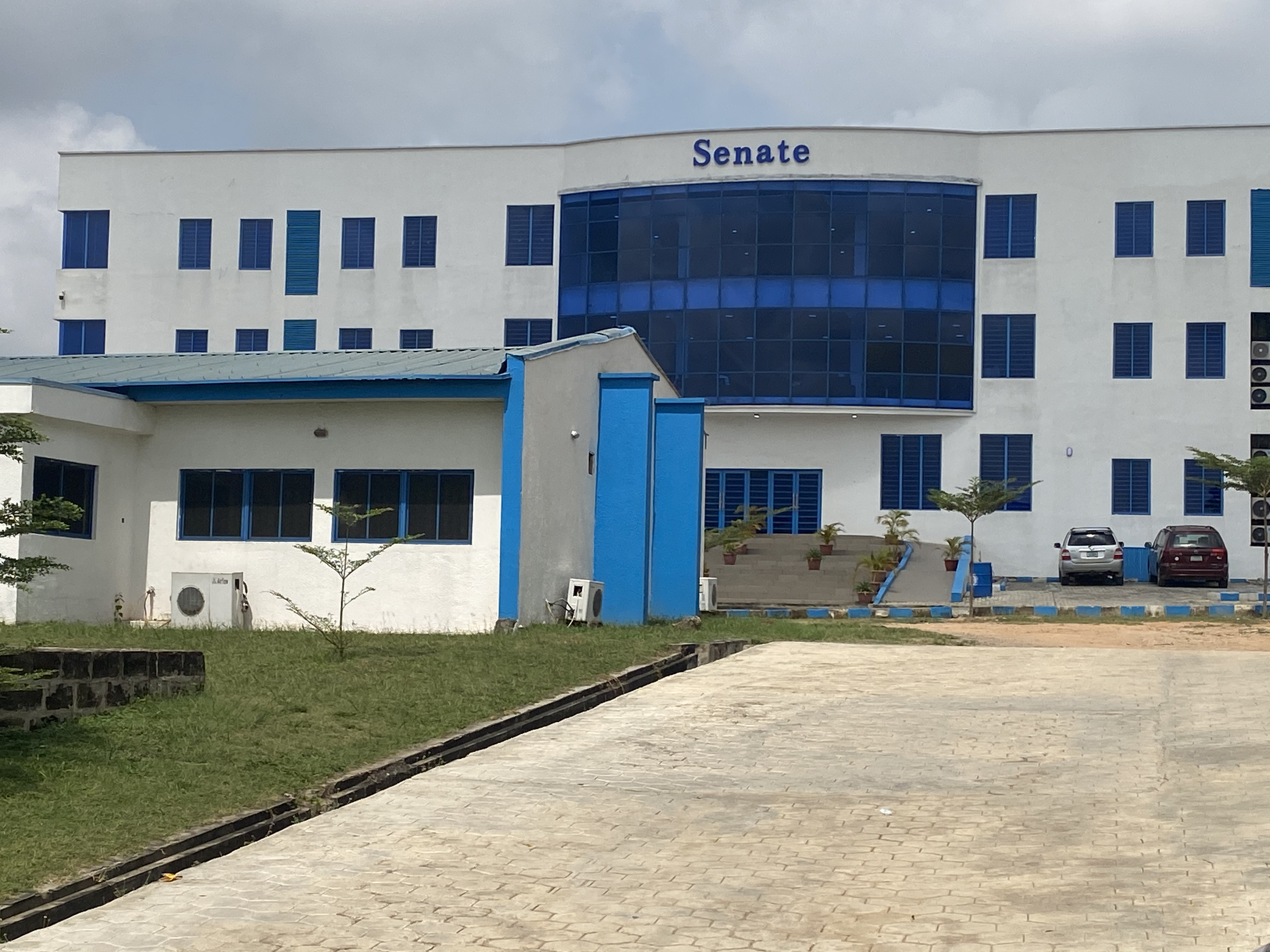
Senate building

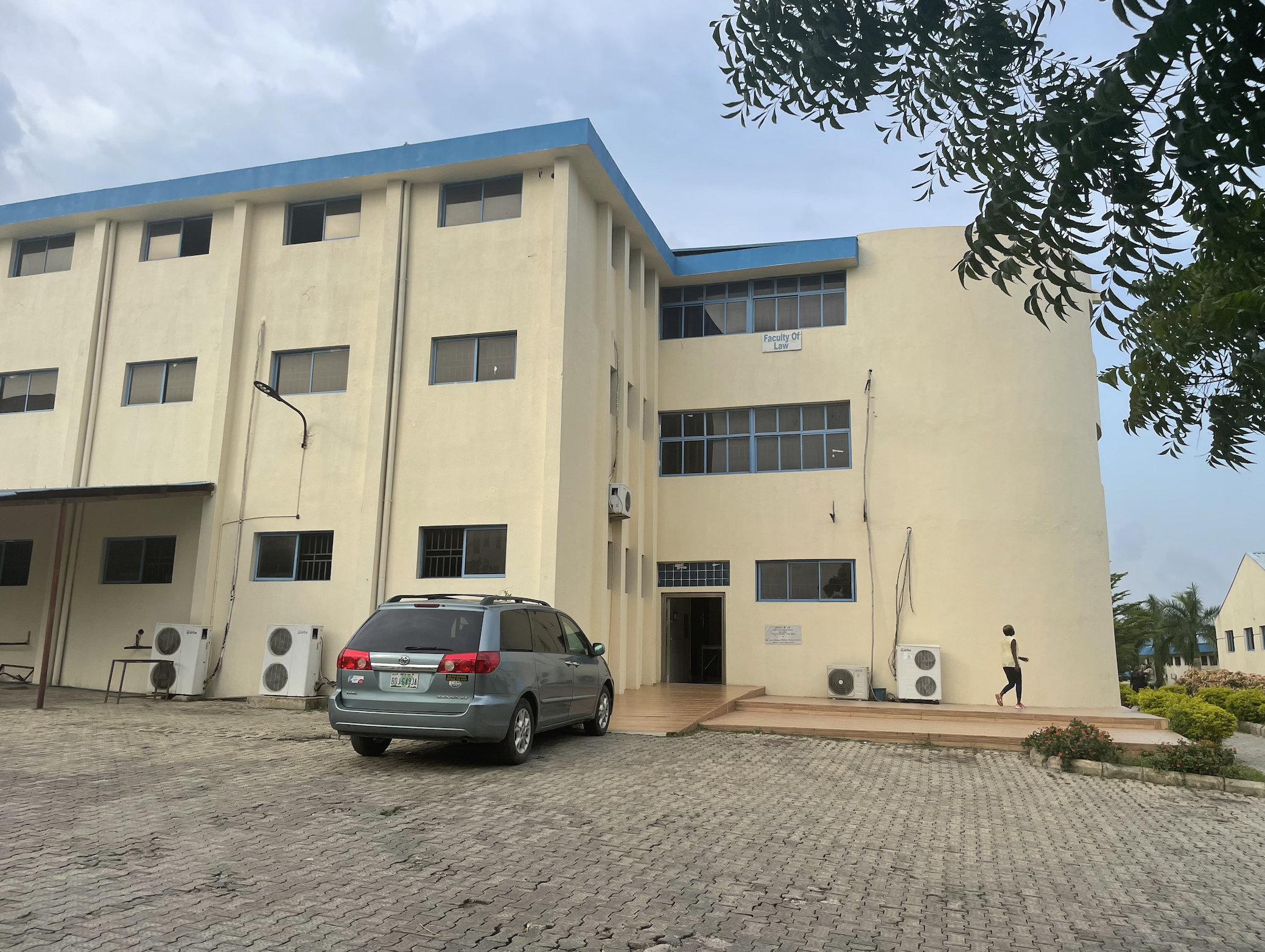
Faculty of Law (2023)
