= Ibadan School of Government and Public Policy =

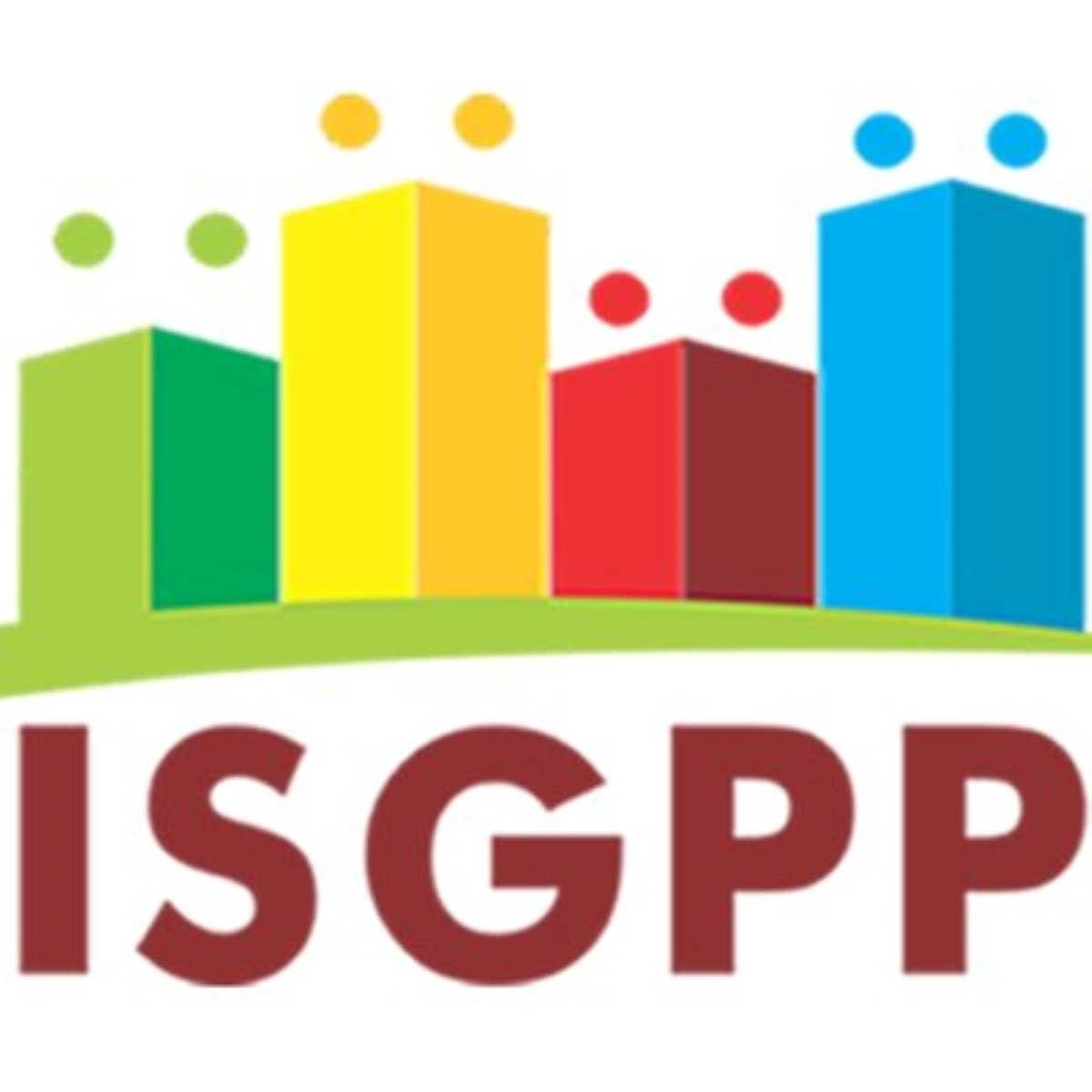
- Logo
- Founder: Tunji Olaopa
- Established: 2016
- Chair: Akin Mabogunje
- Executive Vice Chairman: Tunji Olaopa
- Address: 24, Awolowo Road, Bodija, Ibadan
- Location: Awolowo, Bodija, Ibadan, Oyo State, Nigeria
- Coordinates: 7°24′58″N 3°54′23″E
- Interactive map of Ibadan School of Government and Public Policy
- Website: https://isgpp.com.ng

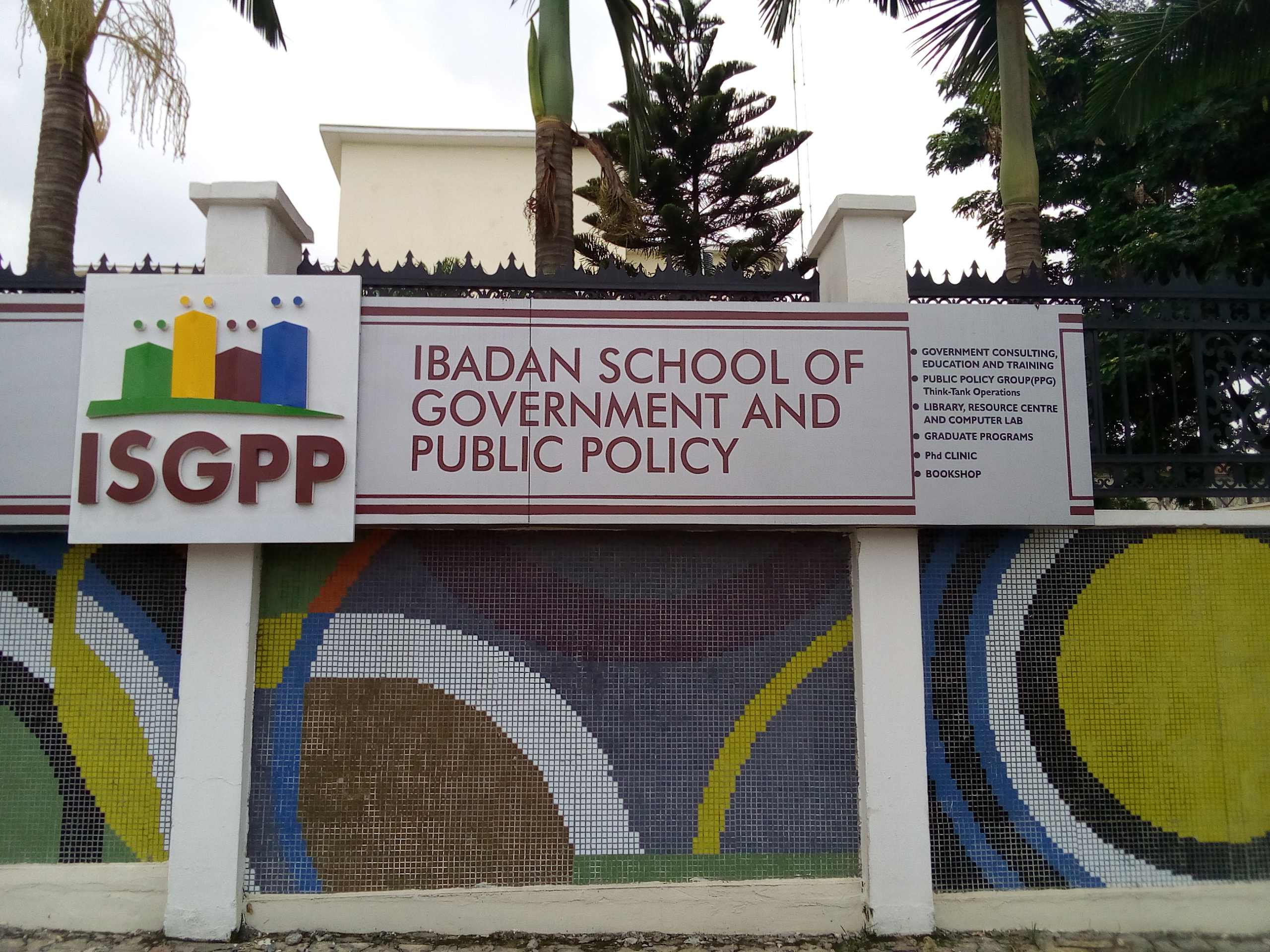
Ibadan School of Government and Public Policy, Awolowo Avenue, Ibadan

Ibadan School of Government and Public Policy (ISGPP) is an independent research organization in Ibadan, Oyo State, Nigeria. It is involved in teaching and research into issues of government, governance, public administration, public policy and development matters in Nigeria and Africa. It also hosts the ISGPP Annual Conference

== History ==
The Ibadan School of Government and Public Policy (ISGPP) was founded in February, 2016 by Dr. Tunji Olaopa, who had recently retired as a Permanent Secretary from the Federal Civil Service in Nigeria.

== Programmes ==
- PhD Clinic
- Graduate Programme
- Public Policy Group
- ISGPP Book Readers Club
- The Olusegun Obasanjo Platform on Intergenerational Leadership
- ISGPP Annual Conference

=== The Public Policy Group ===
The Public Policy Group (PPG) is headed by Prof. Ademola Oyejide and it is tasked with the responsibility of organizing discourses that are meant to positively impact Nigeria’s policy architecture and policy environment. Its communication is through research publications and it reaches out to the public through seminars. Book reading programs are also organized with the aim of educating the public about government and public policy matters. The Public Policy Group is made up of a multi-disciplinary research which includes team policy, foreign policy, industry, economics, governance, social statistics/demography, human rights, education, public service, security, ICT, ethics, media & communications, literature, legislative studies, among others. The methods of operation of the Public Policy Group presents the research programme in research units (clusters). These research units (clusters) include:

1. Governance, Politics, and Public Integrity;
2. Economic Development and Growth;
3. Management of Economic Fluctuations;
4. Social Development;
5. Fiscal Federalism;
6. Exploitation of Natural Resources;
7. National Security and Defense;
8. Education, Science, and Technology;
9. Climate and Environment
10. International Affairs
11. Public Service Governance & Institutional Reform
12. Exportation and Trade Services.
13. Development Communication and Advocacy.
14. Agriculture and Rural Development.
  Notable members of this group include Remi Raji, Funmi Para-Mallam, Gabriel Babatunde Ogunmola, CBN Ogbogbo, Alaba Ogunsawo, Olabisi Ugbebor, Nkoyo Toyo, Abimbola Adelakun.

=== ISGPP Annual Conference ===
The Ibadan School of Government and Public Policy (ISGPP) hosts an Annual Conference to combat issues of bad governance in Nigeria. The inaugural conference was held in 2016 at the International Conference Centre (ICC), University of Ibadan. Personalities at the inaugural conference included former Nigerian President Olusegun Obasanjo; former ECOWAS Secretary-General, Chief Emeka Anyaoku; Vice Chancellor University of Ibadan, Abel Idowu Olayinka; Akin Mabogunje.

=== Book Readers Club ===
This Club is headed by Prof Olabode Lucas. This book club is aimed at promoting reading culture, as well as provide a platform to close the knowledge and information gap in Nigeria. The Book Reading Series, organized by the Book Readers Club brings authors and the general public together in discussions and dialogues.

The book reading events usually brings the authors to the School as well as a Chairman, Lead Reviewer, panel of discussants and the general public.

== Partnership with Google ==
ISGPP's Executive Vice Chairman, Dr Tunji Olaopa stated that the School was entering a partnership with Google Inc. on internet revolution.
