= Okunola Abass Alesinloye =

First Lord of Ibadan, Nigeria (died 1946)

- Olubadan
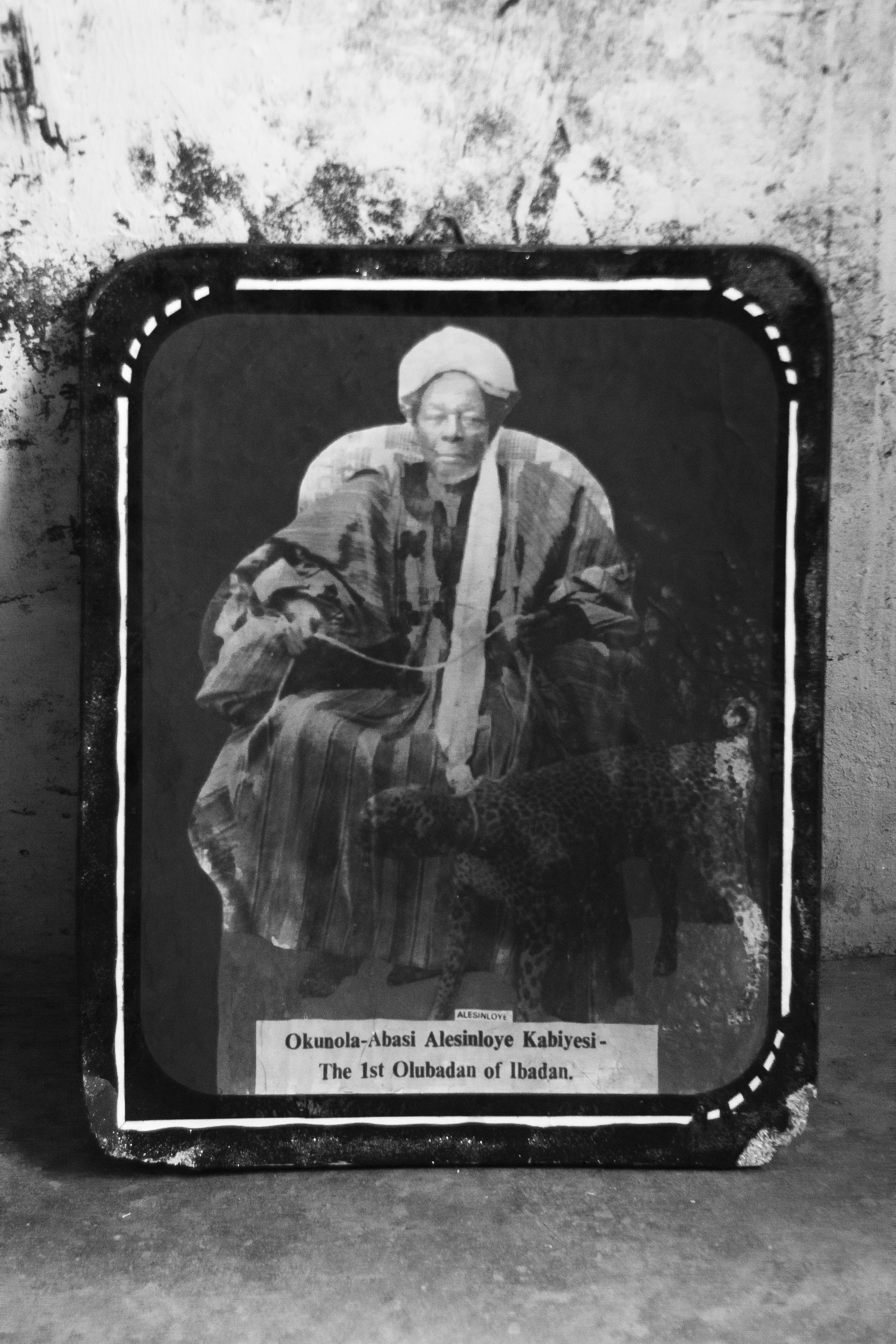

Baale (1930–1936) and Olubadan (1936–1946)
- Reign: 30 May 1930 – 1946
- Predecessor: Baale Oyewole Foko
- Successor: Olubadan Akere I
- Issue: Mohammed Bello Abass
- House: Alesinloye
- Religion: Muslim

Okunola Abass Alesinloye (alternative spellings of Abbas or Abasi, and also Aleshinloye) (died 1946) was the first person to be titled Olubadan (Yoruba: Lord of Ibadan; "the Olu of Ibadan"). He first ruled Ibadan in 1930 as Baale (Yoruba: father of the town), and then became Olubadan in 1936 following a change of title by the British administration. He is also known as the longest-serving Olubadan in history.

== Background and rise to chieftancy ==
=== Background ===
He was a grandson of the first Balogun of Ibadan, Bankole Alesinloye, making him an Ibadan idigene. Okunola Abass started out as an affluent Muslim trader, first titled Baale Elelubo. He profited by monopolising the yam flour trade when the Lagos Railway reached Jebba in 1908.

=== Rise to chieftancy ===
Around 1910, his uncle, the Ekarun Baale Bola Alesinloye, then head of the House of Alesinloye, was asked to step down by Basorun Apanpa due to his old age. Abass was thereafter sent in as a representative. Upon Bola's death in 1918, Baale Situ installed Abass as Ekerin Baale.Following the death of Baale Oyewole on the 9th of May 1930, Abass was installed as Baale on the 30th of May 1930, receiving congratulations from figures such as Captain William Ross, wishing Abass success under the wise guidance of the Alafin, Ward Price wished him long life and a prosperous time.

== Rule ==
On 18 March 1931, the Ibadan Reading and Social Club, founded by the Ibadan Progressive Union, held their first meeting, and Abass, though illiterate, was named President.

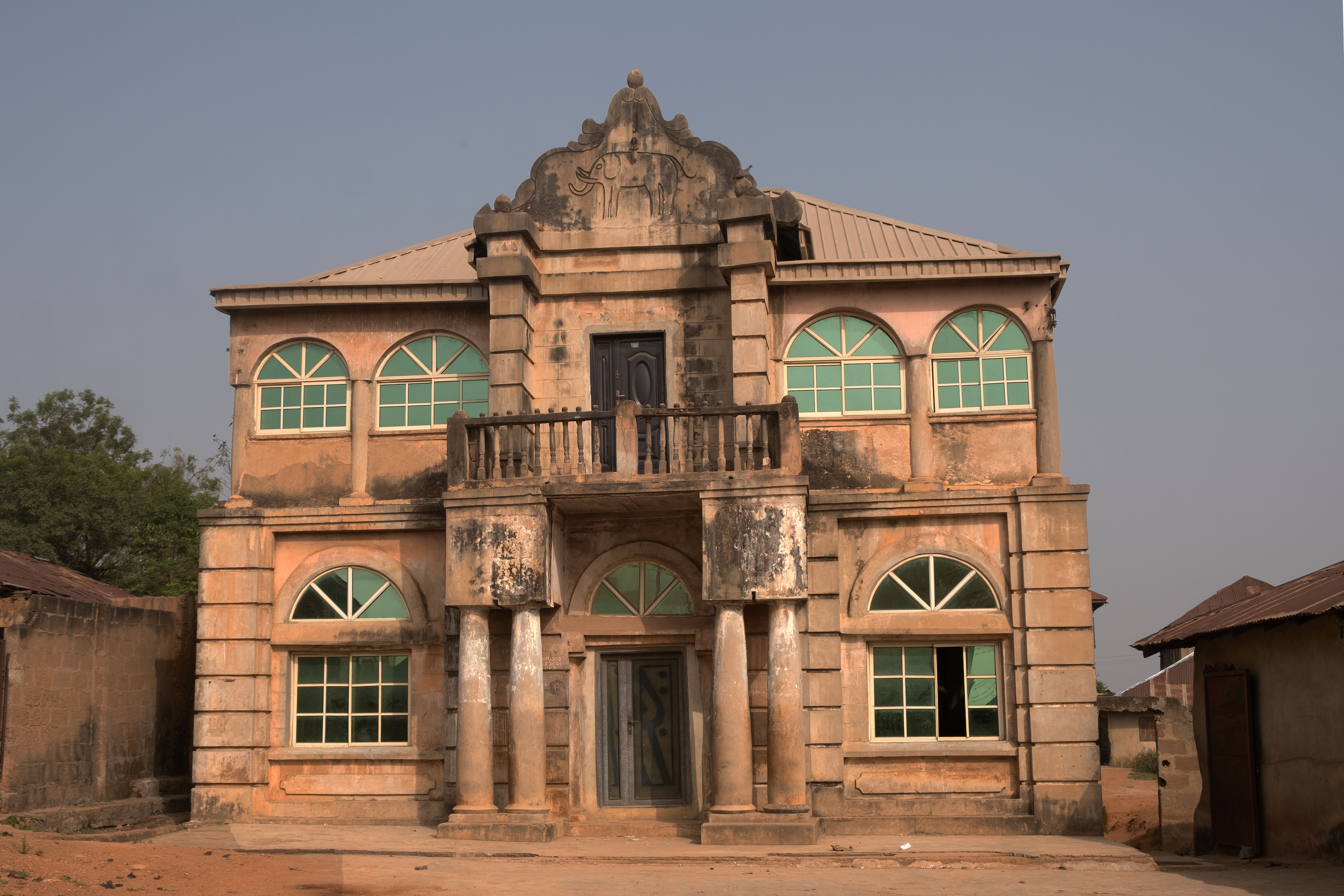
Alesinloye Palace

For King George the 5th's Silver Jubilee, the Baale held a banquet for the higher members of Ibadan society at Mapo Hall. The same hall previously used for Council meetings ceased to be used. Instead, meetings were now convened at Alesinloye Palace.

=== From Baale to Olubadan ===
In 1936, George Hugo Findley met with Abass and two chiefs, named Aboderin and Akinyele. He intended to discuss the administrative system, but the conversation proved unfruitful. The three were more interested in discussing a change of title for the Abass, from Baale to Olu. Abass believed his title to be too common. British officials first deemed this change unnecessary, but this view changed six months later. On 18 June 1936, Findley approved the change in title. War Price asked that the notification of this change be delayed, being worried that trouble may arise as the Alesinloye family may have tried to change the Ibadan monarchy to a hereditary one. From 8 July 1936, the Ibadan Executive Council was expanded to nine members and then, the day after, 57 Ibadan Chiefs signed a petition wanting the aid of Ward Price to bring about the desired change. They claimed that having an Olubadan wouldn't change the constitution of Ibadan. Following this, Ward Price sent a telegram to the Chief Commissioner informing him that he had no objections and the change may take place.

=== As Olubadan ===
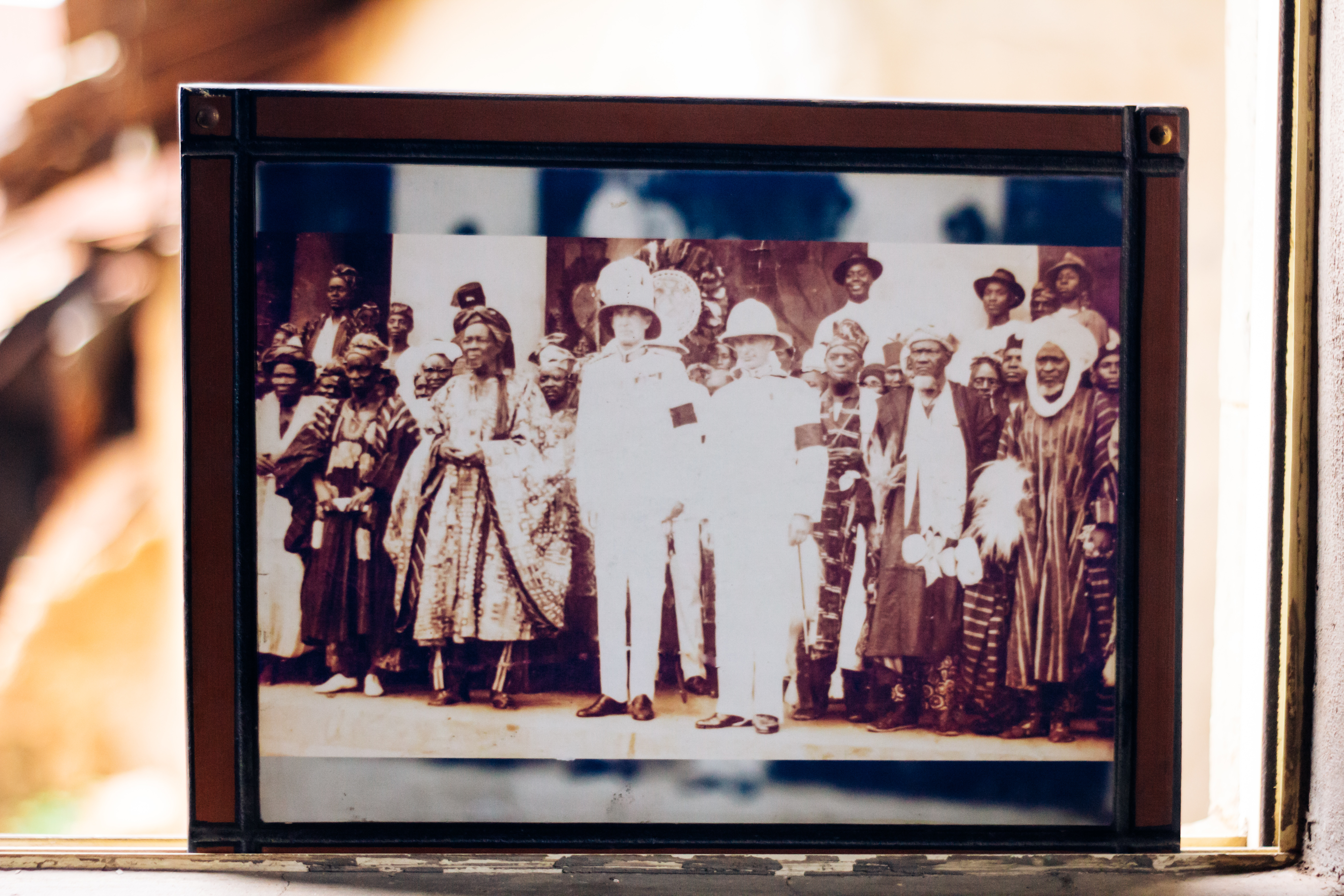
The Olubadan with some British officials and chiefs(third from the left).

Abass was one of those present on the opening of Bower's Tower.

=== Controversies ===
There was much controversy surrounding the Olubadan Damask. Just before the third Conference of Yoruba Chiefs in Ibadan, Resident Kelly received a sample of the Damask and a letter from Alaafin Laugbolu. The consequence of this letter was the passing of the 'Restriction of certain kinds of cloth Order', under a section of the 1933 Native Authority Ordinance. Due to this, the Damask was forbidden to be worn in public, or to be bought or sold. The punishment for this would either be a fine, a month's imprisonment or both.

It was banned for fear that it would incite a riot. The Damask featured on a royal blue background, Abass in Islamic clothing, holding a leopard on a leash, at the top lay the St. Edward crown, and in the border were the words, 'OLUBADAN D'OBA ABUSE BUSE'. The words translated to, 'The Olubadan has become King, Everything is Finished'. According to sources at the time, Abass holding the leopard was meant to signify Oyo being under Ibadan.

In 1938, the Ibadan Patriotic Association (IPA), also known as Egbe Omo Ibile (English: Society of Sons of the Soil), founded by a son of Abass, Mohammed Bello Abass, ordered the Olubadan Damask. They desired to attend the conference wearing the Damask, utilising cloth at the time.

There were attempts by lawyers Alakija and Alakija to reinstate the usage of the Damask; they attempted to advise Governor Bourdillon to seek expert opinion, arguing that he would see an equivalent of the Damask in Britain's own history. They were referring to the meeting of the Field of the Cloth of Gold between Henry VIII of England and Francis I of France. This was their attempt to transform how the Damask was viewed by the administration. Unfortunately for the IPA, this was dismissed. During his reign, a major conflict emerged between the Olubadan and dissident chiefs, described in contemporary accounts as a jihad, used in this context to mean rebellion. The dispute became serious enough that British colonial authorities intervened militarily at Mapo Hall, threatening rebel chiefs with removal from office, loss of stipends and exile unless they submitted to the Olubadan's authority. Although reconciliation was eventually achieved, the episode illustrated the resistance Abass faced from sections of the traditional ruling class over his expanding political and religious ambitions.

=== As a Muslim ===
Olubadan Okunola Abass Alesinloye was known for his strong support of Islam and Islamic scholarship in Ibadan. Arabic chancery documents from his time portray him as a ruler who attempted to reinforce his authority through the usage of the Islamic community and mosques.

Abass took it upon himself to commence the construction of a large central mosque in Ibadan, which caused some disagreements with other chiefs as buildings had to be demolished. Developed through three letters to the Emir of Katsina, the Iwo Community and the Sultan of Sokoto, is Abass' claim to an Islamic caliphate of Ibadan and Yorubaland.

Through the chancery, close ties with Islamic scholars, Qur'anic reciters, imams and religious associations across Yorubaland and Northern Nigeria were demonstrated. In his letters with the Iwo Muslim community, he was referred to as 'Amir al-mu'minin' (Arabic: Commander of the Faithful) of Ibadan. The letter further talked on the importance of scholars and praise on Islamic learning.

Additionally, in these letters, Abass described himself as 'the one whom God has awarded a caliphate over the land of the Yoruba of Nigeria', and in this letter, he was positioned alongside other recognised Muslim rulers in West Africa. Isaac A. Ogunbiyi and Stefan Reichmuth interpreted this as an attempt to project Ibadan as an Islamic political centre comparable to the Sokoto Caliphate, which may not have been accepted by Sokoto.

Abass maintained communication with Muslim communities outside of Ibadan, requesting scholars and clerics from Sokoto to enhance knowledge within Ibadan.

== Legacy ==
Olubadan Okunola Abass Alesinloye is remembered as the longest reigning Olubadan in current history. He is survived by his descendants, the Alesinloye Palace and all the works he was involved in during his tenure.
