= Akin Mabogunje =

Nigerian geographer (1931–2022)

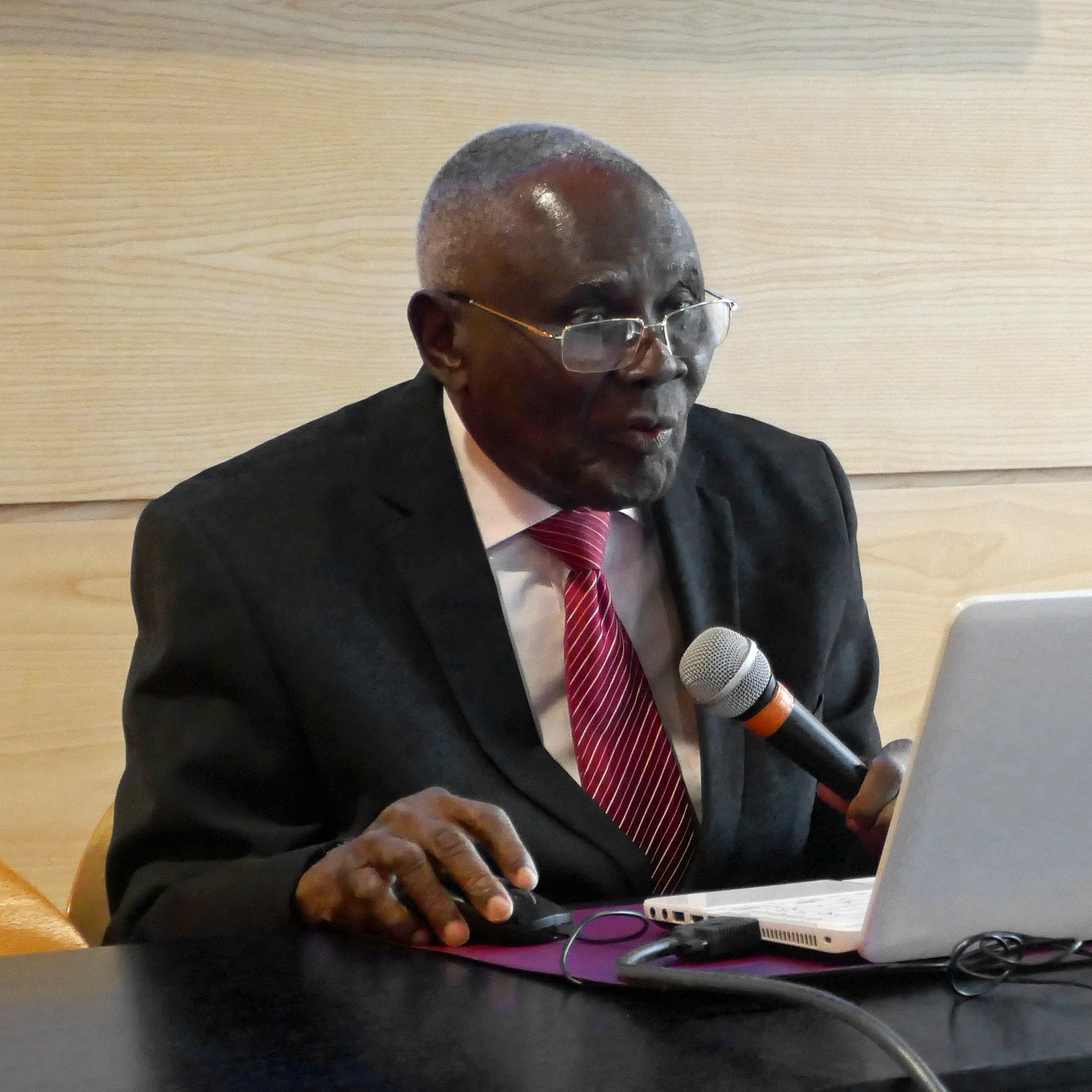
Akin Mabogunje

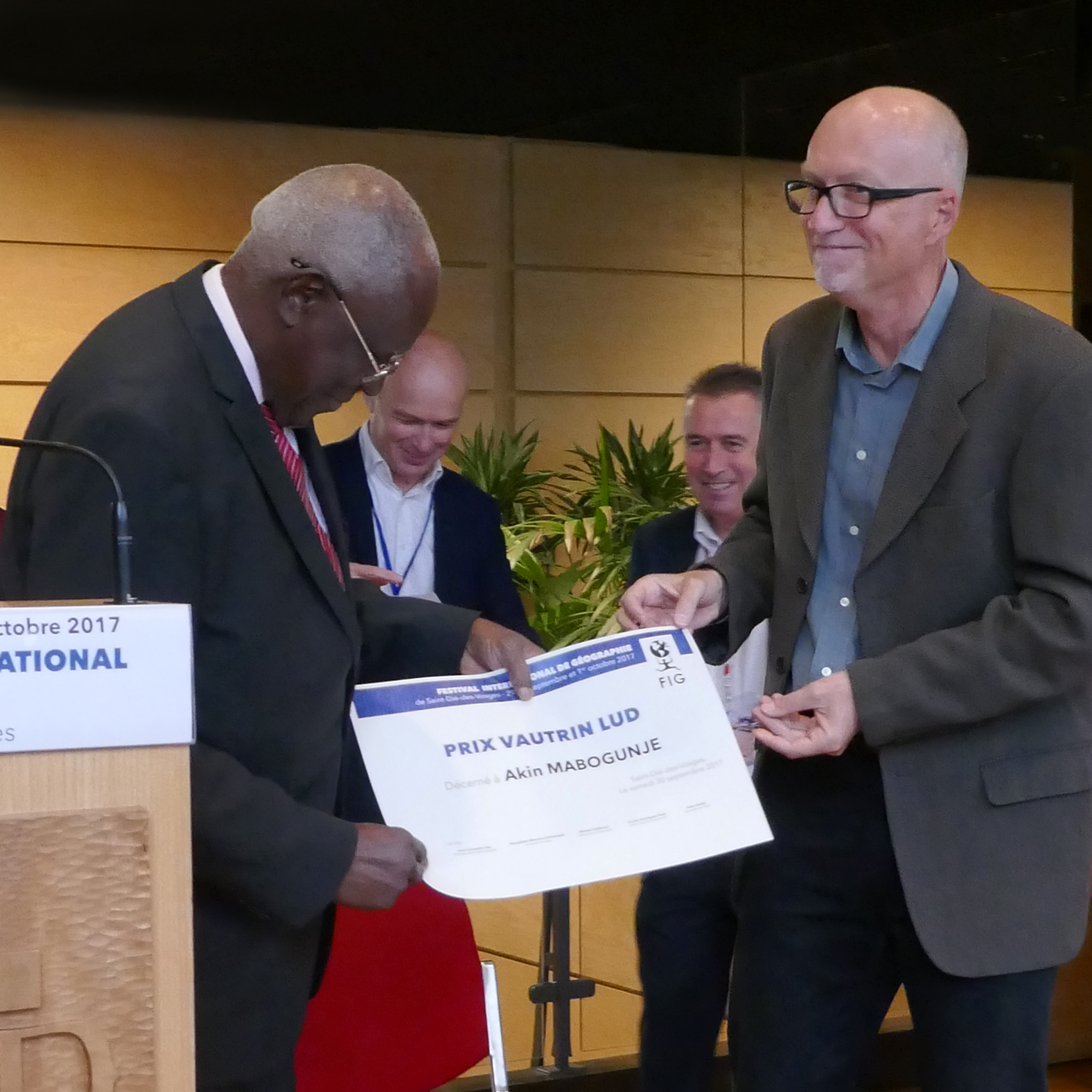
Akin Mabogunje receiving the Vautrin Lud Prize in 2017

Akinlawon Ladipo "Akin" Mabogunje (18 October 1931 – 4 August 2022) was a Nigerian geographer. He was the first African president of the International Geographical Union. In 1999, he was the first African to be elected as a Foreign Associate of the United States National Academy of Sciences. In 2017, he was elected a Foreign Honorary Member of the American Academy of Arts and Sciences and received the Vautrin Lud Prize.

In 1968, Mabogunje wrote Urbanization in Nigeria, about urbanization and state formation. In the book, Mabogunje argued that the existence of specialists is not sufficient to cause urbanization. Mabogunje describes three "limiting conditions" which are additionally required: a surplus of food production, a small group of powerful people to control the surplus and maintain peace, and a class of traders or merchants who can provide materials to the specialists. He was the Chairman of Ibadan School of Government and Public Policy and mentor to its founder Tunji Olaopa.

== Early life and education ==
Mabogunje was born in 1931 in Kano and lived in Sabongari during his primary school years. He then attended Mapo Central School for one year before passing the entrance examination for Ibadan Grammar School. He won the Egbe Omo Oduduwa scholarship to study at the University College, Ibadan, now University of Ibadan, where he later worked as a lecturer. His daughter is Folasade Ogunsola.

== Awards and recognition ==
- He was African president of the International Geographical Union.
- In 1999, he was the first African to be elected as a Foreign Associate of the United States National Academy of Sciences.
- In 1968, Mabogunje wrote Urbanization in Nigeria, about urbanization and state formation.
- In 2017 he received the Vautrin Lud prize.
- He was the Chairman of Ibadan School of Government and Public Policy
- He was a member of the Western Nigerian Economic Advisory Council (1967–71);
- Member, Federal Public Service Review Commission (1972–74);
- Consultant, National Census Board (1973–74);
- Chairman, Nigerian Council for Management Development (1976–79);
- Consultant, Federal Capital Development Authority (1976–84);
- Chancellor, Bells University of Technology, Ota, Ogun State (2005 - 2015)
- Pro-Chancellor and Chairman of Council, Ogun State University, Ago-Iwoye (1982–91);
- Member, Board of Directorate of DFRRI (1986–1993);
- Member, Board of Trustees Nigerian National Merit Award Endowment Fund (1983–1989) later Chairman of the Fund (1989–94)
- Executive Chairman of the National Board for Community Banks (1991–94).
- Member of the Board of Directors, Nigerian Agricultural Products Co. Ltd. (1975–76);
- Vice-Chairman, Pai Association International (Nig.) (1974–1989);
- Vice-Chairman, Board of Directors Pi, International Co. Ltd. (1990–?);
- Chairman, Board of Directors, Fountain Publications (1990-date); Member, Board of Directors, Shonny Investments and Properties Ltd. (1994–?)
- Chairman Board of Directors, First Interstate Merchant Bank (Nig.) Ltd. (1995–?).

== Publications ==
He published many book chapters, journal articles, conference papers, solicited papers, technical reports, books and monographs in local and international outlets among which include:

- Urbanization in Nigeria
- The development process: a spatial perspective
- Regional mobility and resource development in West Africa
- The state of the earth: contemporary geographic perspectives
- Yoruba towns : based on a lecture entitled "Problems of a pre-industrial urbanization in West Africa" given before the Philosophical Society on 12 April 1961
- Shelter provision in developing countries : the influence of standards and criteria
- Owu in Yoruba history
