= Tunji Olaopa =

Nigerian political scientist and public administrator

Prof. Adetunji Olaopa

Chairman, Federal Civil Service Commission
- President: Bola Tinubu
- Incumbent
- Assumed office October 2023

Executive Vice Chairman, Ibadan School of Government and Public Policy
- Incumbent
- Assumed office 2016

Personal details
- Born: 20 December 1959 (age 66)
- Citizenship: Nigeria
- Education: University of Ibadan, Commonwealth Open University
- Occupation: Public Administrator, Political Scientist, Author, Retired Civil Servant
- Known for: Founding ISGPP, Public Administration, Public Policy

Tunji Olaopa, (born 20 December 1959 in Aáwé, Oyo State) is a Nigerian political scientist and public administrator. He is the Executive Vice Chairman of Ibadan School of Government and Public Policy, Bodija, Ibadan and a professor of Public Policy at the Lead City University, Ibadan, Oyo State.

== Early life ==
Tunji Olaopa was born to the family of Festus Adeyemo Olaopa and Beatrice Okebola While Olaopa in Aáwé, Oyo State, Nigeria on 20 December 1959. The family was of the lower middle class.

== Education ==
Olaopa received a BSc degree Political Science from the University of Ibadan, Oyo State in 1984 and an MSc in 1987 from the same institution. He received his PhD in Public Administration from the Commonwealth Open University, United Kingdom in 2006.

== Career ==
Olaopa was the Chief Research Officer, Policy Analyst and Speech Writer at the State House, Abuja. He was also the Assistant Director/Secretary of the White Paper Panel for Nigeria's 1995 Ayida Public Service Reform where he was responsible for the implementation of the reform. He has also been the Coordinator, Education Sector Analysis and Head, Policy Division, Office of the Minister in the Federal Ministry of Education. He was a one time Deputy Director/Head, Technical Secretariat, Reform Strategy Team, Management Services Office. He has also been the Director of Programmes at the Bureau of Public Service Reforms. Also, Olaopa was a Special Assistant on Reforms to the Head of Service of Nigeria on Public Service Reforms. He was also the Director of External Linkages & Reforms Department at the Office of Head of the Civil Service of the Federation; as well as the Director, MDAs Department, Bureau of Public Service Reforms. He rose to the position of Permanent Secretary in the Nigerian Civil Service and he served in that capacity the State House, Abuja; the Federal Ministry of Labour and Productivity, the Federal Ministry of Youth Development, before ending at the Federal Ministry of Communications Technology. He established the Ibadan School of Government and Public Policy in 2016 after his retirement from the civil service.

== Awards & recognitions ==
Olaopa was conferred the National Productivity Award in 2015 and was honoured with the Thabo Mbeki Award for Public Service and Scholarship in early 2018 at Africa conference at University of Texas at Austin. In July 2018, he was made a professor of Public Administration at Lead City University, Ibadan, Nigeria.
