= Olufemi Onabajo =

Nigerian academic

Olufem Onabajo
- Born: Olufemi Onabajo
- Occupations: Nigerian academic and university administrator
- Years active: 1978

Olufemi Onabajo is a Nigerian academic, a professor and a former Vice-Chancellor of Lead City University, a private university in Nigeria.

== Career ==
Onabajo started his career as a secondary school teacher as at 1978. He worked as an editor in Ogun State Broadcasting Corporation (OGBC). He studied and was awarded a master's degree at the University of Lagos. He later joined the Nigerian Television Authority (NTA) in Ikeja, where he served for 10 years before becoming Controller of News and Current Affairs. He has written 23 books in the field of mass communication.
