= Mapo Central School =

Location
- Ibadan; Nigeria

Information
- Religious affiliation(s): Church Mission Society
- Established: 1930s

Mapo Central School was a junior high school in Ibadan, Nigeria established by the Anglican Church Mission Society in the 1930s.

== Notable alumni ==
- Samuel Odulana Odungade I, Nigerian monarch
- Michael Adigun, Nigerian minister of agriculture
- Akin Mabogunje, Nigerian geographer
