= Olubadan =

Royal title in Ibadan

Oba Adewolu Ladoja

44th Olubadan of Ibadan
- Reign: 26 Sept 2025 –
- Coronation: 26 Sept 2025
- Predecessor: Oba Owolabi Olakulehin

Olubadan or Olu of Ibadan (Yoruba: Olubadan, lit. 'Lord of Ibadan') is the royal title of the traditional ruler of Ibadan in Yorubaland.

== Background ==
Ibadan was founded in the 16th century, but the present Yoruba people only took control around 1820. By 1850, they had established their unusual succession principle, which is quite different compared with other traditional Yoruba rulers in that it alternates between two lines. It usually takes decades to groom an Olubadan for the stool through stages of chieftaincy promotion, thus meaning that just about any male born title-holder of the metropolitan centre is a potential king.

== History ==
According to the outline history of Ibadan by Oba Isaac Akinyele, Ibadan was founded in the 19th century. Around 1820, an army of Egba, Ijebu, Ife and Oyo people won the town after the collapse of Owu. After a struggle between the victors, the Oyo gained control in 1829. Being a city established in a period of internecine wars, the warchiefs, led by the Balogun, became the leaders of the town. But since they were more interested in warfare than civil governance, they created the Baale line (civic), to rule when they were away on military campaigns. In 1885, the Royal Niger Company became the effective rulers of the area, signing treaties with local powers such as the Olubadan, and in 1900, the British government formally assumed authority over Nigeria as a "Protectorate". The British created the Ibadan Town Council in 1897, this was the period when the system in which the Baálè (civil) and Balogun Isoriki line (military) shared powersubject to a traditional council representing both lines was established. In 1901, the Governor Sir William MacGregor introduced an ordinance whereby the Baale became the president of the council while the Resident was only to advise when necessary (Rulers of Ibadan were generally referred to as Baale until 1936, when the title of Olubadan was resuscitated).

On 1 October 1960, Nigeria gained its independence from the United Kingdom.

== Palace ==
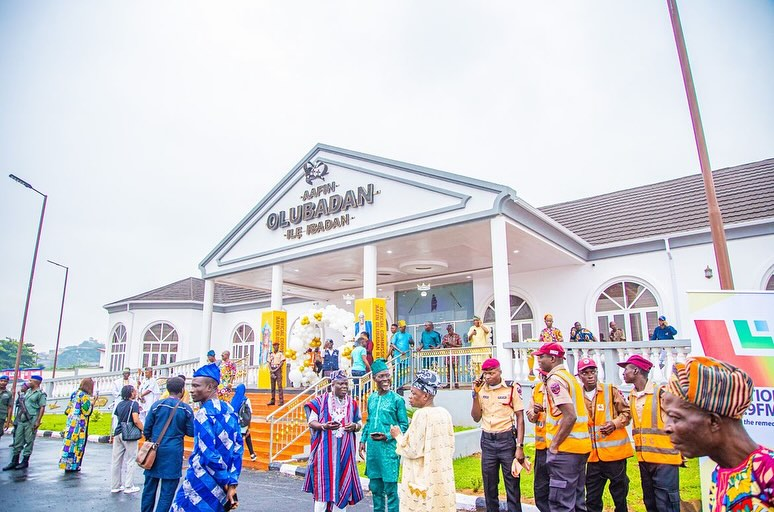
Olubadan palace Ibadan

Following several years of planning and construction, a new palace was inaugurated in July 2024. The new palace complex sits on a six-acre expanse of land situated at Oke Aremo.

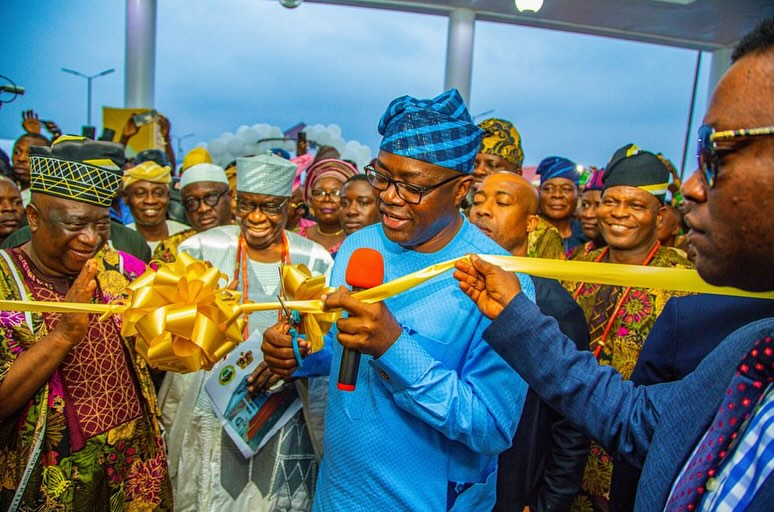
Commission of Olubadan palace

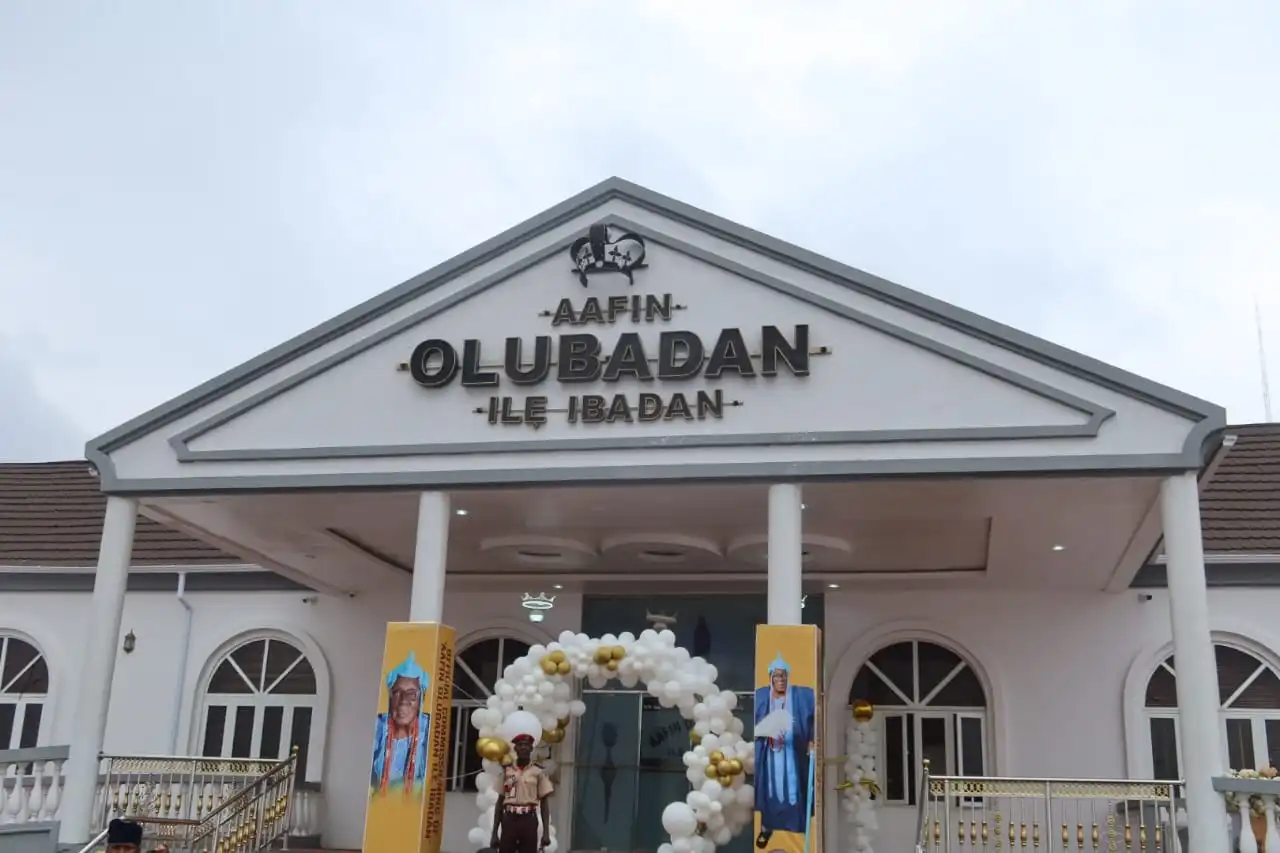
Olubadan palace Ibadan

== Ascension process ==
=== Ruling lines and Rotation ===
There are two ruling lines to the throne of Olubadan, Egbe Agba (civil) and Balogun (military), from where Olubadans are appointed on rotational basis to occupy the stool on the death of a monarch. The next to Olubadan and most senior on both lines are the Otun Olubadan (i.e., oba's "right hand", and #1 deputy on civil line) and Balogun (#1 deputy on warrior line), who under the Western Nigeria Law are recognised as second class traditional rulers and who are included on the Nigerian equivalent of a civil list as a result. Others are the Osi Olubadan (i.e., oba's "left hand" and #2 on civil line), Asipa Olubadan (#3 on civil line), Ekerin (literally "number 4" on civil line) and Ekarun (literally "number 5" on civil line), as well as Otun Balogun, Osi Balogun, Asipa Balogun, Ekerin and Ekarun Balogun, while the Seriki ("commerce minister" or "trade chief") and Iyalode, (i.e. mother of the town as "minister for women affairs" or "female chief") are also members of the Olubadan's privy council.

	Egbe Balogun / Balogun Line / Military Line			Egbe Agba / Otun Line / Civil Line	
Step	Title	Current Title Holder	Step	Title	Current Title Holder
23	Balogun	Oba Tajudeen Adesoji Ajibola	22	Otun Olubadan	Oba Eddy Oyewole
22	Otun Balogun	Oba Kolawole Adegbola	21	Osi Olubadan	Oba Abiodun Kola Daisi
21	Osi Balogun of Ibadanland	Oba John Olubunmi Isioye-Dada	20	Ashipa Olubadan	Oba Hamidu Ajibade
20	Ashipa Balogun	Oba Dauda Abiodun Azeez	19	Ekerin Olubadan	Oba Adebayo Akande
19	Ekerin Balogun	Akeem Bolaji Adewoyin	18	Ekarun Olubadan	Kola Babalola(SAN)
18	Ekarun Balogun	High Chief (Senator) Sharafadeen Abiodun Alli	17	Abese Olubadan	Vacant
17	Abese Balogun	Samuel Adegboyega Adeniran	16	Maye Olubadan	Ismaila Akinade Kilanko Fijabi
16	Maye Balogun	Taiwo Anthony Adebayo Oyekan	15	Ekefa Olubadan	Saka Fola Lapade
15	Ekefa Balogun	Raufu Amusa Eleruwere	14	Agba Akin Olubadan	Teslim Folarin
14	Agba Akin Balogun	Emiola Onideure	13	Aare-Alasa Olubadan	Muibi Ademola Adewuyi
13	Aare-Alasa Balogun	Tirimisiyu Arowolo Obisesan	12	Ikolaba Olubadan	Dauda Kolawole Gbadamosi
12	Ikolaba Balogun	Wasiu Delodun Adegboyega Ajimobi	11	Asaju Olubadan	Williams Oyeleke Akande Oyekola
11	Asaju Balogun	Senior Chief Mukaila Gbolagade Olawoyin	10	Ayingun Olubadan	Oluyinka Akande
10	Ayingun Balogun	Taofeek Ayoade	9	Aare-Ago Olubadan	Olufemi Olukorede Ogunwale
9	Aare-Ago Balogun	Lateef Adetokunbo Akintola	8	Lagunna Olubadan	Wasiu Aderoju Ajibade Olasunkanmi
8	Lagunna Balogun	Nuren Adebayo Akanbi	7	Oota Olubadan	(Barr.) Olumuyiwa Makinde
7	Oota Balogun	Kayode Afolabi Kadelu	6	Aare-Egbe-omo Olubadan	Suraju Abiola lyiola
6	Aare-Egbe-omo Balogun	Adegboyega Taofeek Adegoke	5	Gbonnka Olubadan	(Engr.) Dotun Sanusi
5	Gbonnka Balogun	Monsor Abiola Olatunji Arulogun	4	Aare Onibon Olubadan	Akinola Adekunle Alabi
4	Aare Onibon Balogun	Taiwo Odunlami Akande	3	Bada Olubadan	Oladiran Abiodun Alabi
3	Bada Balogun	Ibrahim Remi Babalola	2	Ajia Olubadan	Vacant
2	Ajia Balogun	Adenrele Lekan-Salami	1	Jagun Olubadan	Vacant
1	Jagun Balogun	Adewale Abass Kadiri			

The civil line hierarchy below the Olubadan proceeds thus:

OLUBADAN   	                
1. Otun         
2. Osi           
3. Ashipa
4. Ekerin           
5. Ekarun          
6. Abese           
7. Maye          
8. Ekefa           
9. etc...

The eleven high chiefs that formed the Olubadan-in-council, apart from the Seriki and Iyalode, are recognised as the traditional head of each of the eleven LGs in Ibadanland. It was learned that the progenitors of Ibadan frowned on the involvement of the senior chiefs in partisan politics because of the salient neutral roles they were expected to play in their domains. For instance, they are appointed as presidents of customary courts, who are expected to adjudicate on matrimonial, land, boundary and other communal disputes.

=== Promotion and Pegging ===
The Olubadan has the sweeping powers to depose or peg a chief, irrespective of the person's position on the chieftaincy line. By implication, high chiefs on the lower cadre could be promoted above a high chief whose position was pegged. Even when forgiven, in the event that he was penitent, the promotion would not be reversed while the offending high chief served his punishment. For instance, during the reign of Oba Fijabi II, between 1948 and 1952, a wealthy Balogun, who was next to Olubadan, was said to have had his chieftaincy pegged. About the same time, a holder of the title of Osi-Olubadan was also hammered for acts of disloyalty to the cause of Ibadanland, an offence regarded as treasonable felony. Spirited efforts made by a former Minister in the old Western Region to seek redress from the government and the courts when his chieftaincy title was also pegged were reported to have failed. Although he was said to have been forgiven after seeking help outside the courts, his juniors who had been promoted above him were said to have remained his seniors thereafter.

In 1983, the late Olubadan, Oba Yesufu Asanike, withdrew the honorary title of Are Alasa from the then Governor of the old Oyo State, the late Chief Bola Ige, for an act considered as being disrespectful to Ibadanland.

=== Olubadan-elect and Governor's Approval ===
On 7 July 2025, it was announced that the 43rd Olubadan Oba Owolabi Olakulehin, had died just two days after celebrating his 90th birthday and after just under one year on the throne. Former Oyo state governor and senator Adewolu Ladoja is set to ascend the throne as the 44th Olubadan after the customary mourning period and coronation rites. Ladoja ascends from Otun Olubadan, a post to which he was promoted in 2024 after the 43rd Olubadan was crowned

On 21 August 2025, governor of Oyo State, Seyi Makinde, officially approved Ladoja as the 44th Olubadan-designate and slated a formal coronation ceremony for 26 September 2025 at Mapo Hall in the city.

== List of Olubadans ==
- Lagelu
- Ba'ale Maye Okunade
- Ba'ale Oluyedun
- Ba'ale Lakanle
- Bashorun Oluyole
- Ba'ale Oderinlo
- Ba'ale Oyeshile Olugbode
- Ba'ale Ibikunle*
- Bashorun Ogunmola
- Ba'ale Akere I
- Ba'ale Orowusi
- Aare Ona Kakanfo Obadoke Latosa
- Ba'ale Ajayi Osungbekun
- Ba'ale Fijabi l
- Ba'ale Osuntoki
- Basorun Fajimi
- Ba'ale Mosaderin
- Ba'ale Dada Opadere
- Ba'ale Sunmonu Apampa
- Ba'ale Akintayo Awanibaku Elenpe
- Ba'ale Irefin
- Ba'ale Shittu Latosa (son of Aare Latosa )
- Ba'ale Oyewole Foko 1925–1929
- Olubadan Okunola Abass 1930–1946
- Olubadan Akere I 1946
- Olubadan Oyetunde I (Salami) 1946
- Olubadan Akintunde Bioku 1947–1948
- Olubadan Fijabi II 1948–1952
- Olubadan Alli Iwo 1952
- Olubadan Apete 1952–1955
- Oba Sir Isaac Babalola Akinyele 1955–1964
- Oba Yesufu Kobiowu July 1964 – December 1964
- Oba Salawu Akanni Aminu 1965–1971
- Oba Shittu Akintola Oyetunde II (Salami) 1971–1976
- Oba Gbadamosi Akanbi Adebimpe 1976–1977
- Oba Daniel 'Tayo Akinbiyi 1977–1982
- Oba Yesufu Oloyede Asanike I 1982–1994
- Oba Emmanuel Adegboyega Operinde I 1994–1999
- Oba Yunusa Ogundipe Arapasowu I 1999–2007
- Oba Samuel Odulana Odugade I 2007–2016
- Oba Saliu Akanmu Adetunji 2016–2022
- Oba Lekan Balogun 2022–2024
- Oba Owolabi Olakulehin 2024–2025
- Oba Adewolu Ladoja 2025 -

== See also ==
- Nigerian traditional rulers
- Timeline of Ibadan
