= Lekan Balogun (monarch) =

Nigerian monarch (1942–2024)

Oba Lekan Balogun

42nd Olubadan of Ibadan
- Reign: 11 March 2022 – 14 March 2024
- Coronation: 11 March 2022
- Predecessor: Saliu Adetunji
- Successor: Owolabi Olakulehin

Senator for Oyo Central
- In office 3 June 1999 – 3 June 2003
- Preceded by: Wande Abimbola (1993)
- Succeeded by: Teslim Folarin
- Born: 18 October 1942; Ibadan, Southern Region, Colony and Protectorate of Nigeria
- Died: 14 March 2024 (aged 81)
- House: Otun
- Religion: Islam
- Occupation: Industrialist

Moshood Olalekan Balogun (18 October 1942 – 14 March 2024) was a Nigerian monarch. He was the 42nd Olubadan of Ibadan.

== Early life and education ==
Moshood Olalekan Balogun was born on 18 October 1942 in Ali-Iwo compound, present-day Ibadan North East Local Government Area of Oyo State, Nigeria.

Balogun travelled to the United Kingdom, where he studied for his O- and A-level certificates while doing a part-time job to sustain himself. Upon completion of his O- and A-level programme, Lekan Balogun proceeded to the Brunel University. He left the university in 1973 with a master's degree in Administration and Economics. He then had a brief stint with the Lambeth Local Government Social Services Department, where he worked for one-and-a-half years after which his academic inclination took the better of him and he enrolled for his PhD.

== Career ==
Lekan Balogun was a presidential aspirant on the platform of Social Democratic Party (S.D.P.); he was also a gubernatorial candidate for the People's Democratic Party (P.D.P.) in Oyo State in the present political dispensation. In addition to this, he was a senator of the Federal Republic of Nigeria in the Fourth Republic.

Lekan Balogun represented Oyo Central senatorial district between 1999 and 2003. As a senator, he was chairman of the Senate Committee on National Planning and was a member of many Senate Committees such as Appropriations, Security and Intelligence, Police Affairs and Defence (Army).

Balogun had earlier worked as a lecturer at Ahmadu Bello University, Zaria, Kaduna State, an editor of the monthly magazine The Nigerian Pathfinder, and as a director with Triumph Newspaper, Kano, as well as a management consultant for multinational Organisations such as Leyland, Exide Battery, and Nigerian Breweries.

Balogun worked with Shell British Petroleum Company where he rose to the position of the Administrator/Head, Industrial Relations, Recruitment and Scholarships, Planning and Development units.

Balogun wrote and published widely. Many of his publications include:

- A Review of Nigeria's 4 years’ Development Plan, 1970–1974;
- Social Justice or Doom;
- Power for Sale;
- Arrogance of Power.

Balogun, who was the Otun Olubadan of Ibadanland (one of the two most senior chiefs in Ibadanland), was crowned the 42nd Olubadan of Ibadanland by Governor Seyi Makinde of Oyo State on 11 March 2022.

== Personal life and death ==
Lekan Balogun was a Muslim and was married to two wives with children. He died on 14 March 2024, at the age of 81.
