= Owolabi Olakulehin =

Nigerian monarch (1935–2025)

Oba Owolabi Olakulehin

43rd Olubadan of Ibadan
- Reign: 12 July 2024 – 7 July 2025
- Coronation: 12 July 2024
- Predecessor: Lekan Balogun
- Successor: Adewolu Ladoja
- Born: 5 July 1935; Ibadan, Southern Region, Colony and Protectorate of Nigeria
- Died: 7 July 2025 (aged 90); Nigeria
- House: Balogun
- Religion: Christianity
- Military career
- Allegiance: Nigeria
- Branch: Nigerian Army
- Service years: 1970–1979
- Rank: Major

Akinloye Olalere Owolabi Olakulehin (5 July 1935 – 7 July 2025) was a Nigerian monarch. He was the 43rd Olubadan of Ibadan.

== Early life and education ==
Owolabi Olakunlehin was born on 5 July 1935 to the family of Pa Ishola-Okin Owolabi and Madam Adunola Aweni Ope Ajilaran Omoyoade Owolabi in Okugbaja village, Ita Baale near Akanran in present day Ibadan North East Local Government Area of Oyo State, Nigeria.

He commenced his primary school education at St James Primary School, Oke Akaran, Islamic School, Odoiye, but eventually finished at St Peter Primary School, Aremo, Ibadan.

After graduating from primary school, Olakulehin taught briefly as a primary school teacher at Wakajaiye in the Akobo area of Ibadan and subsequently gained admission to Yaba Technical Institute for vocational study in printing and artwork.

== Career ==
In 1959, Owolabi Olakulehin commenced his career at the Ministry of Works, Western Region Government in Ibadan, entering as a third-class clerk. Simultaneously, he gained admission to the Yaba College of Technology to pursue his higher studies where he eventually obtained his Ordinary National Diploma and Higher National Diploma in Building.

In 1970, through a Direct Short Service Commission, he enlisted in the Nigerian Army as a 2nd Lieutenant, serving in the Nigerian Army Corps of Engineers. He subsequently undertook diverse roles and assignments throughout the nation, steadily advancing to the rank of Major. During his tenure, he assumed various leadership positions, including that of Commanding Officer of the Army Maintenance Regiment in Jos, Kaduna, and Lagos. He retired as a major on 1 October 1979.

After retiring from the army, Olakulehin ventured into entrepreneurial ventures, through FAKOL Nigeria Ltd, a construction contracting firm, Olakulehin Press, (later rebranded as Solid Prints) and FAKOL Bakery in the city of Ibadan.

Like his predecessor, Owolabi Olakulehin was also a politician as he contested in 1992 and won a seat in the House of Representatives under the Social Democratic Party (SDP) to represent the Ibadan South East Constituency. While in the House, he served as the Chairman of the House Committee on the Nigerian Army.

His journey to becoming the Olubadan of Ibadanland began in 1983, when he emerged the Mogaji of his compound – the Ige Olakulehin Family of Ita-Baale Olugbode, Ibadan, until he became the Balogun of Ibadanland (one of the two most senior chiefs in Ibadanland).

He was crowned on 12 July 2024, and he reigned until his death on 7 July 2025.

== Personal life and death ==
Owolabi Olakulehin was a Christian and he was married with children. He died on 7 July 2025, two days after his 90th birthday.
