= Saliu Adetunji =

Nigerian monarch (1928–2022)

Oba Saliu Adetunji

Olubadan of Ibadan
- Reign: 4 March 2016 – 2 January 2022
- Coronation: 4 March 2016
- Predecessor: Samuel Odulana Odungade I
- Successor: Lekan Balogun
- Born: 26 August 1928; Ibadan, Southern Region, British Nigeria (now in Oyo State, Nigeria)
- Died: 2 January 2022 (aged 93); Ibadan, Oyo State, Nigeria
- House: Balogun
- Occupation: Businessman

Saliu Akanmu Adetunji (26 August 1928 – 2 January 2022) was a Nigerian monarch who was the 41st Olubadan of Ibadan from his coronation in 2016 till his death in 2022.

== Life ==
Saliu was born as the first of 17 children of Raji Olayiwola and Suwebat Amope Adetunji on 26 August 1928 in Ibadan, Oyo State. He grew up learning vocational jobs until he took up fashion designing as a means of living after moving into Lagos. While working as a fashion designer, Saliu delved into musical record marketing until in 1960 when he founded his first of three record label imprints called Baba Laje Records which housed notable fuji music acts including Dauda Epo-Akara, Wasiu Ayinde Marshall and KS1_Malaika.

Prior to his coronation as the Olubadan of Ibadan, Saliu Adetunji was the Balogun of Ibadan land. He died in Ibadan on 2 January 2022, at the age of 93.
