= Samuel Odulana Odugade I =

Nigerian traditional ruler (1914–2016

40th Olubadan of Ibadan
- Reign: 11 August 2007 – 19 January 2016
- Coronation: 11 August 2007
- Predecessor: Yunusa Ogundipe Arapasowu I
- Successor: Saliu Adetunji
- Born: 14 April 1914; Fadina, Lagelu, Ibadan, Southern Region, British Nigeria (now in Oyo State, Nigeria)
- Died: 19 January 2016 (aged 101); Ibadan, Oyo State, Nigeria
- Father: Odulana Ayinla
- Mother: Olanrewaju Ayinke Odulana
- Religion: Christianity

Samuel Odulana Odugade I (14 April 1914 – 19 January 2016) was the 40th Olubadan of Ibadan and also reputed to have been the oldest living monarch in Nigeria.

== Early life ==
He was born in the small village of Fadina in the town of Ibadan, on 14 April 1914, to Chief Odulana Ayinla and Mrs. Olarenwaju Ayinke. He began his elementary education at Saint Andrew’s School, Bamigbola, Ibadan in January of 1922 and transferred to St. Peter’s School, Aremo in 1929. He completed his primary school at St. Peter's School, Aremo, Ibadan in 1929 and his middle school education at Mapo Central School in 1936.

== Career ==
Odugade was an Army officer during World War II. After returning from service in 1945, he was appointed to be in charge of the demobilisation of returning soldiers in Lagos. He briefly worked with United Africa Company (UAC) as a produce clerk before commencing his teaching career at the Church Missionary Society (CMS) Elementary School, Jago in 1938. He also taught in several schools from 1939 to 1942 while with the Colonial Office Education Department in 1964. He went into politics in 1959 as a Member of the House of Representatives and was appointed parliamentary secretary to Tafawa Balewa. He was Minister of State for Labour and in 1964 he led the Nigerian Parliamentary delegation to the London Constitution Conference to restructure the former British colonies of Rhodesia and Nyasaland (now Malawi, Zimbabwe and Zambia).

He joined the Royal chieftaincy line in 1972 as the Mogaji of Ladunni Compound in Ibadan. In 1976, he was conferred Jagun-Olubadan.

Odugade was the co-founder of several organisations, such as, the Ibadan Economic Foundation and the Ibadan Progressive Union. He was conferred the honorary degree of Doctor of Management Technology by the Federal University of Technology, Akure, Ondo State, in December 2005.

He was crowned Olubadan of Ibadan at the age of 93 years on 11 August 2007. He was a member of The Cathedral of St. Peter, Aremo, Ibadan, an Anglican church.

== Death ==
Odugade died on 19 January 2016, at age 101.
