= Kabiru Aderemi Adeyemo =

Nigerian academic

- Born: Ibadan
- Citizenship: Oyo State
- Occupations: Researcher, professor
- Employer(s): Lead City University, Ibadan
- Organization: Fellow Certified Institute of Public Administration Fellow of Chartered Accountants of Nigerian Society for legal matters Association of Commonwealth Universities (ACU

Kabiru Aderemi Adeyemo (born 1965) is a Nigeria Professor of Management & Accounting at Lead City University Ibadan. Oyo State, Nigeria. He is the Vice chancellor of Lead City University.

== Academic career ==
Kabiru Aderemi Adeyemo started his academic career as a teacher at Ife Anglican Grammar School in Ile-Ife. Also, he served as a teacher at Olode Grammar School in Olode.

He possesses teaching and research expertise in higher education. He also worked for Osun State College of Technology and Ladoke Akintola University of Technology (LAUTECH). He is a visiting professor at Babcock University and also at the Federal University of Agriculture, Abeokuta, and CIPA, Ghana. Throughout his career, he made significant contributions to knowledge in Management and Accounting, Business Policy, Strategic Management, Entrepreneurship, Law, Project Management, and Governance.

Kabiru Aderemi Adeyemo obtained a B.Sc. in Accounting and an MBA in Management & Accounting from Obafemi Awolowo University, Ile-Ife, and his master's degree in Peace & Conflict at the University of Ibadan. He holds Ph.D.s in Management & Accounting and Law from the University of Nigeria. An educator, strategic analyst, entrepreneur, and mentor, he is currently Vice Chancellor at Lead City University.

== Organizations ==
He was the past President of the Rotary Club of Ibadan 2016-2017. He was the Vice President of Wednesday Social Club of Nigeria. He was the Secretary Honorary Members of 2-DIV Army Officers Mess at Agodi Ibadan, NASFAT. He is also a member of RANAO Association, Ibadan, The Professional Group Lafia Business Club Ibadan, and also a friend of Omo-Ajorosun, Ibadan. He is a member of Bethel CICS II, Ibadan.

== Memberships and fellowships ==
Kabir Aderemi Adeyemo is a member of the following

- Fellow Certified Institute of Public Administration, Ghana.
- Fellow of Chartered Accountants of Nigerian.
- Society for legal matters
- Association of Commonwealth Universities (ACU).
- Fellow of Certified Fraud Examiners.
- Fellow Association of Forensic Researcher.
- Chartered Institute of Taxation
- Associate Chartered Institute of Personal Management (CIPM)
- Fellow of Certified Fraud Examiners
- Kabir Aderemi Adeyemo is a member of the Committee of Vice-Chancellors of Nigerian Universities (CVCNU), which serves as the overarching body for Vice-Chancellors in Nigerian Federal, State, and Private Universities.

== Awards ==
- He received the esteemed Outstanding Leadership Award from the Uni-Caribbean Business School in 2021.
- He was honored with the Award of Excellence for distinguished service and scholarly contributions to humanity by the Retired Members of the Nigerian Armed Forces.
