= Mapo Hall =

City hall in Ibadan, Nigeria

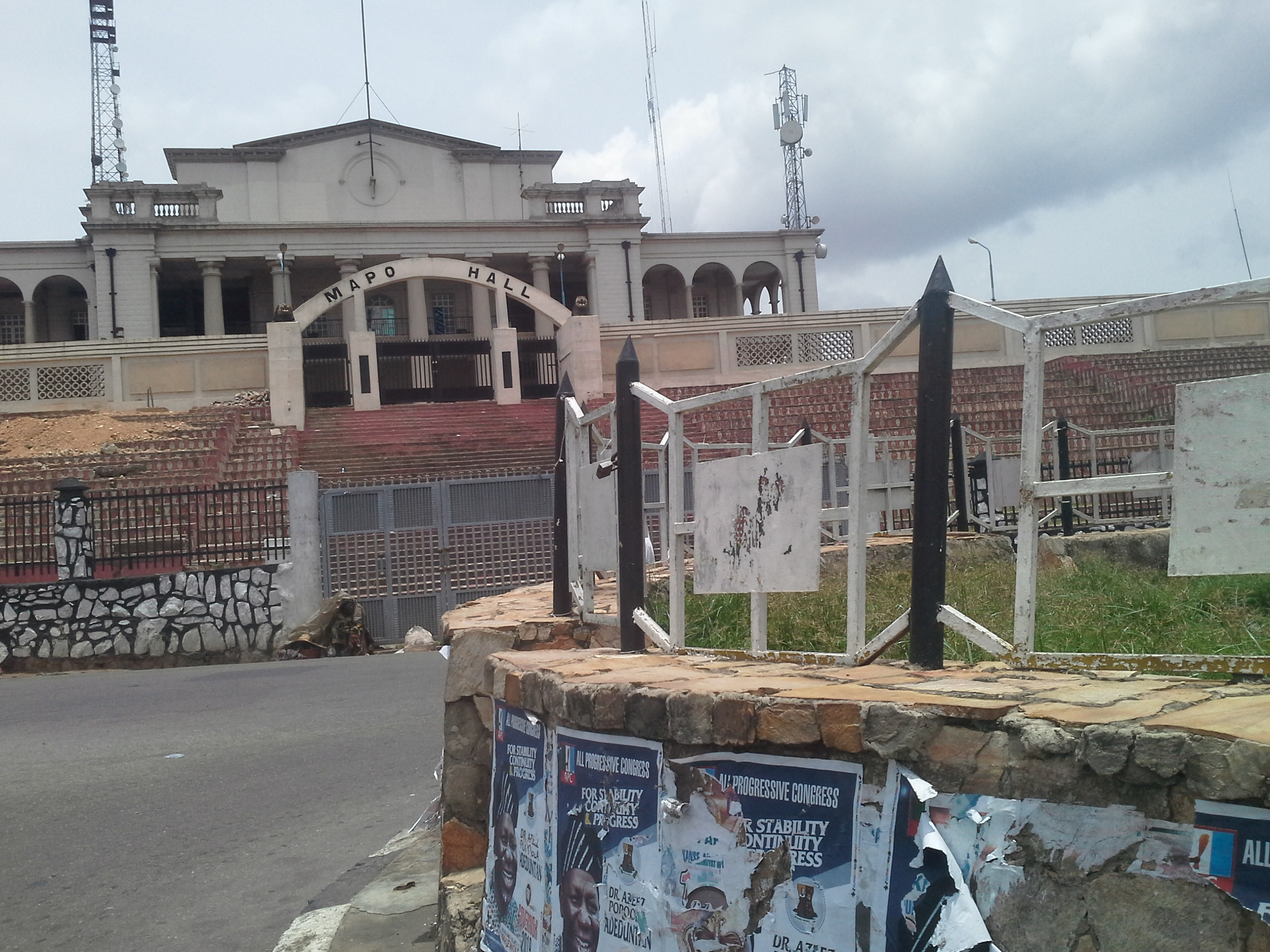
- A view of the hall as seen from the road

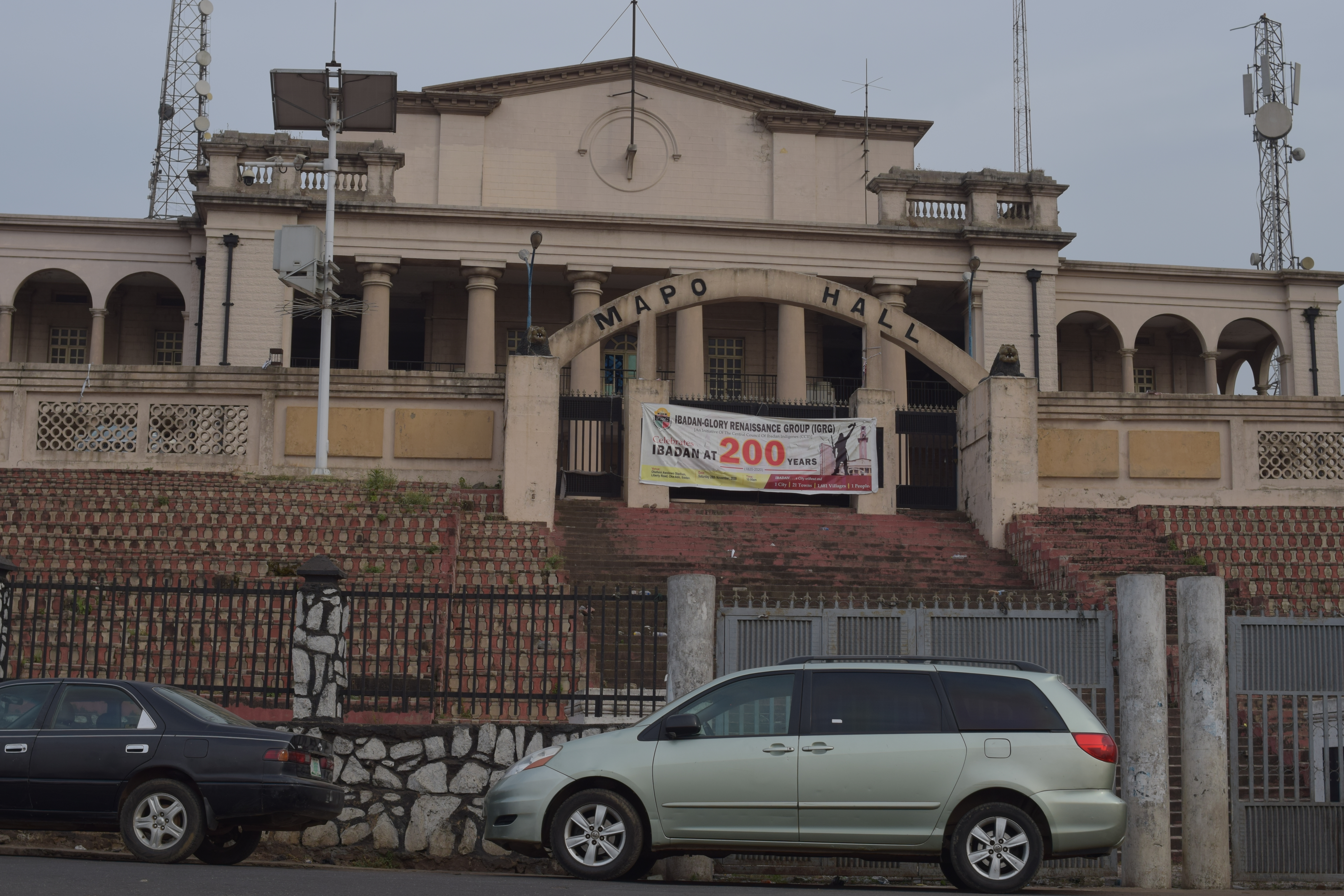
MAPO HALL, Ibadan

Mapo Hall is the colonial-style Ibadan City Hall on top of Mapo Hill in Ibadan, Oyo State, Nigeria. Mapo Hall was commissioned during the colonial era by Captain Ross in 1929.

It was designed and constructed by Engineer Robert Jones. Robert A. Jones (1882–1949), also known as "Taffy", was a Welsh man who worked in southern Nigeria between 1910 and 1944. He was a member of Ibadan Native Authority in 1923 as a road engineer, where he remained until his retirement to Wales. He is also ascribed as being the engineer who built the Manor House in Iseyin.

The cost of construction was reported as £24,000, and construction took four years between 1925 and 1929. The foundation stone was laid in June 1925 by Captain W. A. Ross (The Resident, Oyo Province) and it was completed and declared open by Sir Graeme Thomson during the traditional leadership of Oba Shiyanbola Ladugbolu, the Alaafin of Oyo and Oyewole, the Baale of Ibadan.

The Neoclassical architecture of the hall is a constant reminder of early British influence in the administration of Ibadan as part of the Oyo Province. The hall serves as an important landmark that could be seen from most part of the city, especially from the other six hills between which the city spreads out. Labour was provided by the natives, probably by the prisoners held here as tax defaulters and other slaves. It was renovated in 2006 amid some controversy. The renovated hall was commissioned by former President Olusegun Obasanjo on 6 September 2007.

Over the years, the hall had played host to major political and social events in the city, shaping the socio-political direction of Nigeria in general. The Sixth Annual Convention of the National Council of Nigeria and the Cameroons was held there on 5 May 1955 and that was where Nnamdi Azikiwe delivered his presidential address. In May 1967, the Western Leaders of Thought also met there and it was there that Chief Obafemi Awolowo outlined his thoughts on the ongoing Civil War in Nigeria and stated that "I can see no vital and abiding principle involved in any war between the North and the East." In Campaigning for the 1983 elections, Chief Awolowo also held a campaign rally there in 1983 where he made the famous quote - "Kaka ki Kiniun se akapo Ekun, kaluku a ya se ode ti e l’ototo ni," meaning "the Lion would rather hunt separately rather than be the bag bearer for the Tiger." Also, the former Governor of Oyo State, Late Abiola Ajimobi, chose to crown 24 new kings in Ibadan land at the Mapo hall.

The hall hosts a mini-museum, where the relics of the chains used to hold tax evaders in the colonial era are hung. There are also pictures of all Olubadan (King) that have reigned in Ibadan.

Mapo Hill, the site of the hall, is one of the oldest part of Ibadan city, a high density area occupied mainly by the indigenes of the town. The hall was built on a piece of land measuring 5,969 acres surrounded by roads with its main entrance on Ogunmola Street. It is directly facing Mapo Road. Getting to the hall from Ogunmola Street is through ascending a series of very wide steps which also serve as seats for spectators and residents during the innumerable occasion that the hall was used for major events. The palace of the Olubadan of Ibadan is a few minutes walk to its left and Iba Oluyole statue lies a few minutes walk to its right.

It is currently owned and managed by Ibadan Local Government Properties Company Limited.

Some scenes of the 2019 biopic about the life of Herbert Macaulay, The Herbert Macaulay Affair were shot in Mapo Hall. The local government area that is surrounded by Mapo Hill are as follows; Ido Local Government Area is the largest local Government Area in Ibadan Oyo State spanning from Orita Challenge, Apata, Eleyele Ologuneru axis towards Eruwa, it serves as the Commercial and industrial zone of Ibadan. Its corridors are noted for fast development. Mapo Hill encompasses the area of Beere to Oja'ba (King's Market) axis.

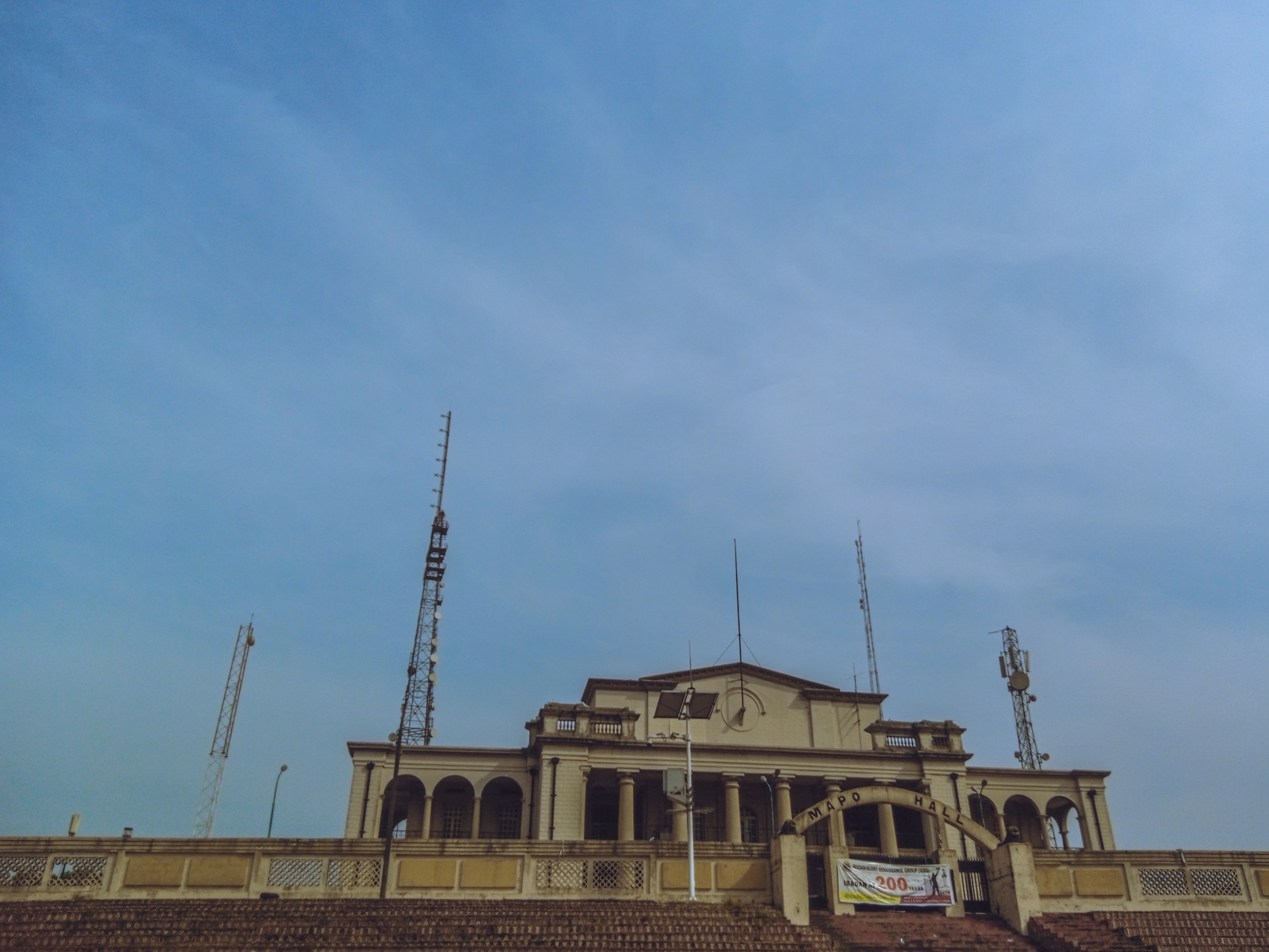
Mapo hall's entrance
