= Olabisi Ugbebor =

Nigerian academician

Olabisi Ugbebor FMAN

Professor of Mathematics at University of Ibadan

Personal details
- Born: Grace Olabisi Falode; 29 January 1951 (age 75) Lagos State
- Education: University of Ibadan (Bachelor of Science in Mathematics); University College London (Postgraduate diploma in Statistics); University College London (Doctor of Philosophy in Mathematics)

Olabisi Oreofe Ugbebor (born Grace Olabisi Falode, 29 January 1951) is the first female professor in mathematics in Nigeria. Born in Lagos, she studied mathematics at the University of Ibadan and then at the University of London, where she obtained a PhD in 1976.

== Education and academic career ==
Born in Lagos, Ugbebor had her secondary education at Queen's College, Lagos. She completed her first degree in mathematics from University of Ibadan in 1972. In 1973, she had a postgraduate diploma in statistics at University College London, before completing her thesis on Sample Path Properties of Brownian Motion (1976) at the age of 25. While at Unibadan, she was the only female student in her class. She is also the first Nigerian woman to get a PhD and become a professor in mathematics. In 2017, she was made a Fellow of the Mathematics Association of Nigeria.

== Publications ==
- He's Polynomials for Analytical Solutions of the Black-Scholes Pricing Model for Stock Option Valuation
- The modified Black-Scholes model via constant elasticity of variance for stock options valuation
- Analytical Solutions of a Continuous Arithmetic Asian Model for Option Pricing using Projected Differential Transform Method
- Fast Fourier Transform of Multi-Assets Options under Economic Recession Induced Uncertainties
- Approximate solutions of a variable volatility driven black-scholes option pricing model
- CONSTRUCTION OF ANALYTICAL SOLUTIONS TO THE BLACK-SCHOLES OPTION VALUATION MODEL BY MEANS OF HE’S POLYNOMIALS TECHNIQUE\
- Analytical solutions of a time-fractional nonlinear transaction-cost model for stock option valuation in an illiquid market setting driven by a relaxed Black-Scholes assumption.

== Membership of learned societies ==
- Reciprocity Member, London Mathematical Society
- Member, Nigerian Mathematical Society
- Member, Mathematics Association of Nigeria.
- Member, African Economic Society.
- Member, Bernoulli Society for Mathematical Statistics and Probability(1988-1992)
- Member, Third World Organisation of Women in Science, Italy, 1993-date.
