= Academic grading in Nigeria =

In Nigeria, the academic grading system scales from A (First class) to F (fail). Below is the grading system of Nigerian schools.

Nigeria offers six years of basic education, three years of junior secondary education, and three years of senior secondary education. If a student chooses to continue higher education this is then four years of tertiary/university education.

Mathematics and English language are compulsory for all students in Nigeria although maths may not be required for some courses in higher institutions - this is dependent on admissions criteria.

== University Grades in Nigeria ==
Percentage	Grade (Global)
0 - 4%	A
60 - 69%	B
50 - 59%	C
45 - 49%	D
40 - 44%	E
0 - 100%	F

Most Common

Grade	Scale	Grade Description	US/EU Grade Equivalent
A	70.00 - 100.00	First Class Honours (5)	A
AB	70.00 - 100.00		A
B	60.00 - 69.99	Second Class Honours, Upper (4)	B+
BC	60.00 - 69.99		B+
C	50.00 - 59.99	Second Class Honours, Lower (3)	B
CD	50.00 - 59.99		B
D	45.00 - 49.99	Third Class (2)	C+
E	40.00 - 44.99	Pass (1)	C
F	0.00 - 39.99		F

5-point University (Example - University of Lagos)

Grade	Scale	Scale 2	US/EU Grade Equivalent
A	70.00 - 100.00	5.00	A
B	60.00 - 69.00	4.00	AB
C	50.00 - 59.00	3.00	B
D	45.00 - 49.00	2.00	BC
E	40.00 - 44.00	1.00	C
F	0.00 - 39.00	0.00	F

Postgraduate

Not all universities use merit score - often pass 40%+ or distinction 70% grade given

Grade	US/EU Equivalent
Distinction	70%+
Merit/Credit	60%+
Pass	40%+ (typically 50%)
Fail	0 - 39%

Note that NUC (Nigeria University Commission) has expressed strong recommendation to upgrade passing scores in Nigeria universities to 45 which by implication would phase out 40 as pass mark for undergraduate studies. Additionally, to discontinue awarding degrees below 3rd class (if all universities ultimately comply).

Also, at post graduate level, the minimum pass mark for course works is usually 50 (rather than 40).

== International Baccalaureate (IB), Advance Placement (AP) Courses, SATs ==
Whilst some international universities recognise West African Examinations Council (WAEC), many others ask Nigerian students for International Baccalaureate (IB) exams or for students to take five or more Advanced Placement (AP) courses, or possibly the first year of an undergraduate degree at a university known as a foundation (course or diploma) if they gain admission with WAEC.

In Nigeria many students who intend to take international exams do entry exams on top of their WAEC. There are arguments against making Nigerian students who clearly qualify to take an additional admission exam. However many top American and EU universities require choice of IB, SAT or ACT and SAT Math 1 or 2 and a science subject test and letters of recommendation depending on the course the student wishes to take.

== Joint Admissions and Matriculations (JAMB) ==
The Joint Admissions and Matriculations Board (JAMB) is a Nigerian entrance examination board for tertiary-level institutions. Every year, the Joint Admission and Matriculation Board conducts an examination that determines if a student will be admitted to higher education. All of these candidates must have obtained the West Africa School Certificate, now West African Examinations Council, WAEC, or its equivalent National Examination Council (Nigeria), NECO.

Range of UTME Scores	Marks
400-381	60
378-380	59
-	-
283-300	43
-	-
246-250	33
-	-
196-200	23
191-195	22
186-190	21
180-185	20

== West African Senior School Certificate (WASSCE) / WAEC A Levels, GCE ==
West African School Certificate (WAEC) replaced the West African General Certificate of Education Ordinary and Advanced levels (GCE ‘O’ and ‘A’ levels) in 1989 and is equivalent to high school / upper secondary passout grades in their 6th year of basic education for admission into Colleges. Many students can use this for direct entry into university in Nigeria, Africa and internationally depending on admissions criteria.

Grade	Scale	Grade Description	US/EU Equivalent
A1	1.00 - 1.99	Excellent	A+
B2	2.00 - 2.99	Very Good	A
B3	3.00 - 3.99	Good	B
C4	4.00 - 4.99	Credit	B
C5	5.00 - 5.99	Credit	C
C6	6.00 - 6.99	Credit	C
D7	7.00 - 7.99	Pass	D
E8	8.00 - 8.99	Pass	D
F9	9.00	Fail	F

General Certificate of Education (GCE)

Grade	US/EU Grade Comparison
A	A
B	B
C	B
D	C
E	C

== National Examination Council (NECO) ==
This is another Nigeria's awarding body school in Nigeria at GCE ‘O’ and ‘A’ levels. The National Common Entrance Examination is administered to pupils in their 6th year of basic education for admission into Colleges. Two examinations are held annually. Students take an exam on Mathematics, General Science and English and various including Social Studies.

Grade	Grade Description	US Grade
A1	Excellent	A+
B2	Very Good	A
B3	Good	B
C4	Credit	B
C5	Credit	C
C6	Credit	C
D7	Pass	D
D/E8	Pass	D
F9	Fail	F

== See also ==
- Nigeria
- Federal government of Nigeria
- Grading in education
