= Bodija =

District in Ibadan, Nigeria

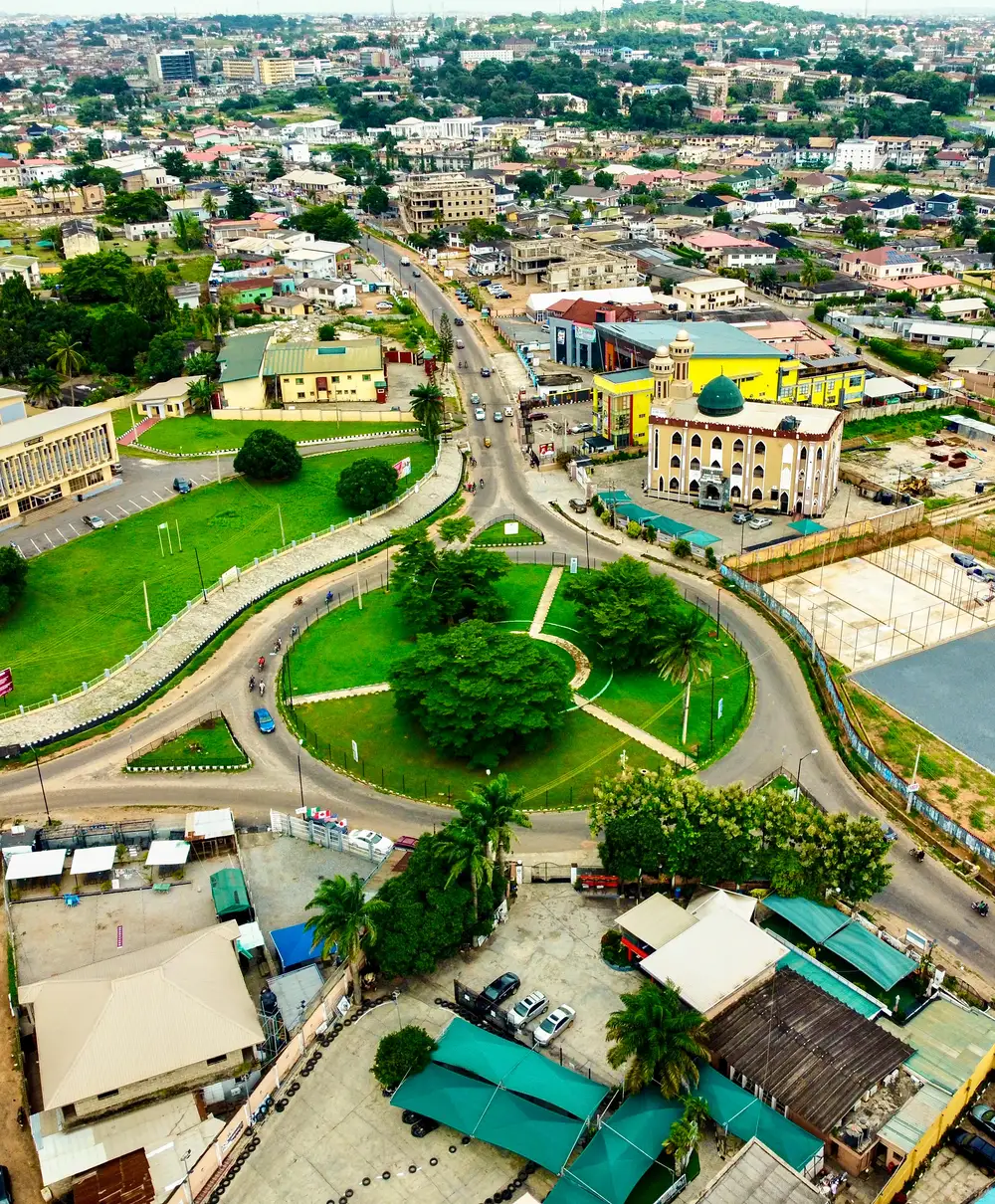
Bodija District Ibadan Nigeria

Bodija is a district in Ibadan, Oyo State, Nigeria. The district gained prominence with the development of like-named highbrow, a leafy residential estate created by the Western Nigeria Region after the independence of Nigeria.

Most of the early homeowners were expats, judges, professors and high-ranking civil servants. The initial community of Old Bodija was expanded with the creation of a "New Bodija" in the '70s. The estate is home to many popular schools within the state.

In the 80s, a produce and timber market named Bodija Market was sited within proximity to the residential estate and is one of the largest Markets in Ibadan. The recent commercialization of the estate has resulted in the conversion of several of the residential buildings to offices and businesses. An explosion occurred in Bodija on 17 January 2024, where two lives were lost and dozens injured.
