= Yoruba name =

Yorùbá names are the given names adopted primarily by speakers of the Yoruba language and the Yoruba diaspora.

== Naming ceremonies ==
Originally, male Yorùbá children were named on the eighth day after their birth, while the female child was named on the seventh day. However, nowadays, both genders are named on the seventh day or eighth day. The names of the children are traditionally found by divination performed by a group of Babalawo – traditional Ifá priests, but in recent times names can also come from those of ranking members of the family, including the father, mother, grandparents, or next of kin. Both the mother and father and other elderly relatives can give their own favorite names to the child or children. That is why the Yorùbás usually have a long list of names. Baby names often come from the grandparents and great grandparents of the child to be named. The name traditionally divined by the Babaláwo indicates the Òrìṣà that guides the child and whether the child is a reincarnated ancestor and the destiny of the child and the spiritual entities that will assist the child in achieving it. There is first a private ceremony for just the parents where the names are given along with taboos for the child and parents and suggestions on what the child will need to be successful. Some days after that a public ceremony with feasting and entertainment is held and family and friends are all invited to celebrate the arrival of the child.

== Composition and importance of names ==
Yorùbá names are often carefully considered during the week prior to the naming ceremony, as great care is placed upon selecting a name that would not reflect any sort of negativity or disrepute. In other words, selecting a name that previously belonged to a thief or criminal for a Yorùbá child is not considered as a wise idea, as it (according to Yorùbá philosophy) could result in the child growing up to become a thief or criminal. The Yorùbá believe that previous bearers of a name have an impact on the influence of the name in a child's life.

Yorùbá names are traditionally classified into five categories:

- Orúko Àmútọ̀runwá 'Destiny Names', ("names assumed to be brought from heaven" or derived from a religious background). Examples are: Àìná, Ìgè, and Òjó.
- Orúkọ Àbísọ 'Acquired Names', (literally "given on earth" or granted by next of kin). These include: Ọmọ́táyọ̀, Ìbílọlá, and Adéyínká.
- Orúkọ Oríkì 'Panegyrical'. These names include: Àyìnlá, Àlàó, and Àjọkẹ́
- Orúkọ Àbíkú. An Àbíkú is a child who cycles repeatedly, and within a short time frame, between life and death, thereby causing grief to the parents. The Yorùbá have a corpus of special names for the Àbíkú. Some of these are appealing, while others are derogatory. Examples include: Kòsọ́kọ́, Dúrósinmí, and Ikúkọ̀yí
- Orukọ Ìnagijẹ 'epithetic names'. Examples include: Eyínfúnjowó, Ajíláràn-án, and Ajíṣafẹ́

Two of the most common destiny names among the Yoruba are Táíwò (or Táyé) and Kẹ́hìndé, which are given primarily to twins. It is believed that the first of the twins is Táíwò (or Táyé), "tọ́-ayé-wò" meaning, (One who tastes the world) whose intention in coming out first is to perceive whether or not the environment that they are about to enter is a good one for their superior to be in. When he or she is satisfied, he or she somehow informs the other twin, Kéhìndé (now anglicised to Kenny, "kẹ́hìn-dé" meaning the one who comes last) to come out.

Another with a traditional religious example is Ifáṣolá- Ifá grants wealth. Likely given to a child that is to be trained as a Babaláwo and it is predicted that the practice of Ifá will make the child wealthy and successful.

Modern Christian parents use the form of traditional names but substitute the Òrìṣà name with Olú or Olúwa, meaning Lord or My Lord, which indicates the Christian concept of God and Jesus Christ. For example: Olúwatiṣé (The Lord has done it) – the parents prayed for a child and were granted one by God, often replaces the more traditional Ifátiṣe, which recognizes the Divination system/Òrìṣà Ifá.

Muslim parents tend to give their children Islamic names. These names converted to fit into Yorùbá phonetics during pronunciation. Rofiah becomes Rafiat or Ràfíátù, Is'haq becomes Ísíákà, Usman becomes Sùnmọ́nù, Idris becomes Dìísù, Khadijah becomes Khadijat or Àdíjá, Aisha becomes Aishat, Ismail becomes Ismaila or Súnmẹ́là, Qudrah becomes Kúdírá, Kudirat, Kúdí, or Kudiratu, Imran becomes Múráínà, Dhikrullah becomes Síkírù, and so on.

An acquired name may signify the position of the family in the society (e.g. "Adéwale", a typical royal family name). It may also signify the traditional vocation of the family (e.g. "Àgbẹ̀dẹ", the blacksmith or the prefix "Ògún," the patron god of blacksmiths and hunters).

Yoruba also have Oriki, a kind of praise recital used to emphasize the achievements of the ancestors of the various families. Oriki could be a single word name like "Àdùnní", or it could be verses recounting the ancestry of the person and their feats. Though not typically part of a standard name, the Oríkì is often used alongside one and is usually generally known to a person's acquaintances. Many individuals can even be recognized by the people of another town or even clan by using the oríkì of their ancestral line.

== Popular Yoruba given names ==
In Yorubaland, there are a series of names which are popularly given to babies during naming ceremonies by their parents. These are some of the most common names for Yoruba people.

Names
Male	Female
Abiodun	Abosede
Adewoyin	Abimbola
Abioye	Abisola
Anuoluwapo	Anuoluwapo
Oluwadamilare	Morenikeji
Damilola	Damilola
Adewale	Folasade
Adisa	Eniola
Alabi	Adesewa
Inioluwa	Inioluwa
Ajibola	Bimpe
Afolabi	Adeola
Ayokunle	Ayodamola
Gbenga	Olabisi
Adewale	Lolade
Olaoluwa	Oluwatosin
Ayomide	Ayomide
Ademola	Demilade
Oluwole	Olubukola
Oladele	Oluwaseyi
Olawale	Olayinka
Olumide	Ololade
Adedamola	Kikelomo
Babatunde	Yetunde
Olanrewaju	Olayemi
Akinyele	Labake
Aremu	Toluwalase
Adetokunbo	
Adebowale	
Olalekan

== Yoruba name shortforms ==
Yoruba names are usually shortened to standard shortforms depending on the name. For example, Oluwafemi becomes Femi, Folasade becomes Sade, Olajide becomes Jide, Toluwani becomes Tolu and so on. This shortform of the names are used in the household, intimate settings as well as in professional setting if chosen.

== See also ==
- Yoruba Name Project
