= Akinyele =

Akinyele may refer to:

- Akinyele, Oyo State, a local government area in Nigeria
- Akinyele (name), with a list of people
- Akinyele (rapper) (born 1971), American rapper
