= Michael Omolewa =

Historian and UN official

His Excellency Michael Abiola Omolewa
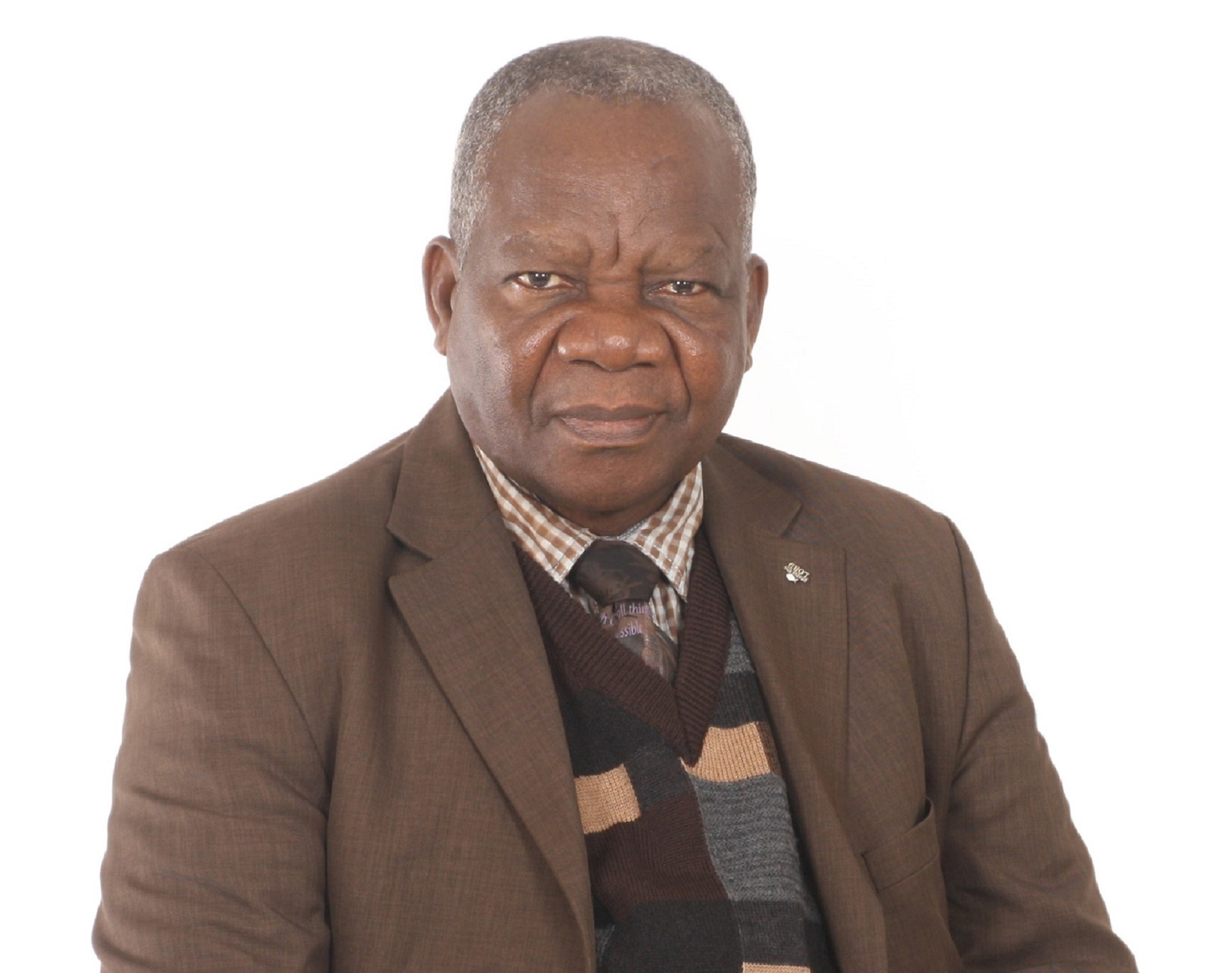
- Omolewa in 2022

President of the General Conference of UNESCO
- In office 29 September 2003 – 3 October 2005
- Preceded by: Ahmad Jalali
- Succeeded by: Musa Bin Jaafar Bin Hassan

Permanent Delegate and Ambassador of Nigeria to UNESCO
- In office 31 January 2000 – 31 August 2009
- President: Umaru Musa Yar'Adua; Olusegun Obasanjo
- Preceded by: Emmanuel Olusegun Akinluyi
- Succeeded by: Mariam Yalwaji Katagum

Personal details
- Born: 1 April 1941 (age 85) Ipoti-Ekiti, Nigeria
- Spouse(s): Famata Saptieu Omolewa: née Adams; from The Gambia
- Education: University of Ibadan; University of Dakar; University of London; University of British Columbia

Michael Abiola Omolewa (born 1 April 1941) is a Nigerian diplomat, scholar, education historian, and civil servant. From September 2003 to October 2005, he served as the 32nd president of the General Conference of the United Nations Educational, Scientific and Cultural Organization (UNESCO). While president, Omolewa led UNESCO to adopt the International Declaration on Human Genetic Data and the Convention for the Safeguarding of Intangible Cultural Heritage. From January 2000 to August 2009, Omolewa served as permanent delegate and ambassador of Nigeria to UNESCO. At University of Lagos, on Wednesday 6 February 2019, Omolewa delivered the 5th Enoch Adeboye Annual Birthday Public Lecture; titled: Peace: The Global Quest.

Omolewa is an emeritus professor of adult education at the University of Ibadan. He is a former deputy chair of the governing board of the Commonwealth of Learning in Vancouver, British Columbia, Canada. Omolewa is also a member of the Commonwealth Advisory Council on Teacher Mobility, Recruitment and Migrations in London.

In September 2008, Omolewa was given the President's award for distinguished contribution to world peace and solidarity by Bulgaria's President Georgi Sedefchov Parvanov. Also during 2008, Omolewa was inducted into the University of Oklahoma's International Adult and Continuing Education Hall of Fame.

He is a board member of ILI: International Literacy Institute – within Graduate School of Education, established by UNESCO and the University of Pennsylvania: United States of America in 1994.

== Early life and education ==
=== Childhood and schooling ===
Born on 1 April 1941 in Ipoti-Ekiti, Ekiti State: Nigeria, Omolewa attended Ibadan Grammar School, Ibadan from 1955 to 1958. Subsequently, he schooled at Ekiti Parapo College, Ido-Ekiti from 1959 to 1960; and later went to Christ's School Ado Ekiti from 1962 to 1963.

=== Higher studies ===
For a year, from September 1975 to September 1976, Omolewa was at Faculty of Education King's College London. Later on, from September 1983 to September 1984, he studied at Adult education department of Vancouver, British Columbia, Canada based University of British Columbia – with an October 1983 to November 1983 attachment to Athabasca University. Also, for more studies, UNESCO Institute for Education, Hamburg: West Germany welcomed Omolewa from October to November 1988. From May to June 1991, he took an Advanced Christian Leadership course at Haggai Institute, Singapore.

=== Academic qualifications ===
- BA (Honours) Second Class: Upper Division with Specialization in African History: University of Ibadan: June 1967.
- PhD with Specialization in the History of Administration of Europe: University of Ibadan: 1973; including related studies at University of Dakar, University of London, University of British Columbia and Athabasca University, Canada.

== Ambassador to UNESCO ==
=== Two terms ===
In January 2000, President Olusegun Obasanjo first appointed Omolewa to a 5-year term as Permanent Delegate and Ambassador of the Federal Republic of Nigeria to UNESCO in Paris. Consequently, before he left for France, Omolewa took leave of absence as a professor at University of Ibadan. For his services to Nigeria and humankind worldwide, President Obasanjo, in January 2005, reappointed Omolewa to a second 5-year term as Permanent Delegate and Ambassador of Nigeria – to enable him complete his tenure as President of UNESCO's General Conference – to which he had been earlier elected in September 2003.

=== Service to Nigeria ===
Under Omolewa's servant leadership plus efforts as Ambassador and Permanent Delegate to UNESCO, Nigeria was, in 2007, proposed for 6 additional World Heritage Sites – namely: Arochukwu Long Juju of Aro Confederacy: Igbo Land; Surame Cultural Landscape; Oke Idanre: Idanre Hill; Ogbunike Caves; Ancient Kano City Walls and Associated Sites, Kano and Alok Ikom Stone Monoliths.

Also, Omolewa facilitated the nomination and inscribing, in July 2005, of Osun Osogbo Sacred Grove as a UNESCO World Heritage Site; as well as UNESCO's establishment of a Category 2 Institute for African Culture and International Understanding in Abeokuta, Nigeria during April 2009.

== President of UNESCO General Conference ==
On 29 September 2003, Omolewa, as Ambassador and Permanent Delegate of Nigeria to UNESCO became the first West African to be elected President of the General Conference (GC) of UNESCO for the following two years. The GC of UNESCO is the highest decision making and governing body of that United Nations specialised agency.

Accordingly, the General Conference consists of representatives of the 195 States Members of UNESCO and 8 Associates. The GC meets every two years; and is attended by Member States and Associate Members, together with observers for non-Member States, intergovernmental organisations and NGOs: non-governmental organisations. Each country has one vote, irrespective of its size or the extent of its contribution to the budget of UNESCO.

The General Conference of UNESCO determines the policies and the main areas of work of the Organization. Its duty is to establish programmes and budget of UNESCO. It also elects members of the Executive Board of UNESCO and appoints, every four years, the Director-General of UNESCO. The working languages of UNESCO's General Conference are: Arabic, Chinese, English, French, Russian and Spanish.

== Honours and awards ==
Omolewa has the following recognitions, awards, prizes and honours:

- Presented UNESCO Gold Medal by Director-General of UNESCO, 3 October 2005

== Publications ==
=== Relevant books ===
- Omolewa, M. (1975). Evening Schools and Adult Education in Nigeria, German Adult Education Association Special Publication Series, no. 7. Bonn: DVV.
- Omolewa, M. (1978). Field Work and Historical Excursions in Adejunmobi. S. A. (Ed.). Handbook of High School History Teachers. Ibadan: pp. 79–100.
- Omolewa, M. (1979). Supporting Institutions, in Bown, L. and Tomori. S. H. O. Handbook of Adult Education for West Africa. London: Hutchinson Africa Library.
- Bown, L. and Omolewa M. (1979). The Future, in Bown, L. and Tomori, S. H. O. Handbook of Adult Education for West Africa. London: Hutchinson Africa Library: pp. 240–253.
- Omolewa, M. (1979). Mass Literacy programmes in the next Civilian Regimes: Proceedings of the Ninth National Seminar on Functional Literacy. Ibadan: Department of Adult Education: University of Ibadan.
- Omolewa, M. (1980). Centralised and Decentralised Administration as a Determinant of Educational Policy in Nigeria: A Historical Survey, in Yoloye, E.A. and Flechsig, A. H. (Eds.). Bonn: Educational Research for Development: pp. 371–389.
- Omolewa, M. (1980). Historical Antecedents of Junior Literature in Nigerian Schools: A Survey from earliest times to 1945, in Unoh, S. (Ed.). Junior Literature in English. Ibadan: African Universities Press: pp. 188–196.
- Omolewa M. (1981). Historical Notes on Modern Language Teaching in West Africa, in Brann, C. M. B., Evans, H. and Banjo, A. (Eds.). Modern Language Teaching. Ibadan: pp. 1–10.
- Akinpelu, J. A. and Omolewa, M. (Eds.). (1981). Training of Personnel for the proposed Mass Literacy Campaign: Proceedings of the 10th Annual National Functional Literacy Seminar, Ibadan: Department of Adult Education: University of Ibadan: pp. 267.
- Omolewa, M. (1981). The life and times of Chief T.L. Oyesina. Ibadan: Abiprint and Pak Ltd.
- Omolewa, M. (1981). Adult Education Practice in Nigeria Ibadan: Evans Brothers, Nigeria Publishers: pp. xv and 159. Reprinted: 1985.
- Oyedeji, L. Omolewa M and Asiedu K. (1982). Handbook of Literacy Education in West Africa. Lagos: Longman Nigeria: pp. vii and 117.
- Omolewa, M. and Fadeke Adewumi (Ed.). (1983). Towards an effective Take-off of the National Mass Literacy Campaign: Proceedings of the 12th Annual National Functional Literacy Seminar. Ibadan: Department of Adult Education: University of Ibadan. p. 231.
- Omolewa, M. (1985). Abdullahi, Ajayi; Carpenter, Chadwick; Coomasie, Mackell; Ogunlesi, Ogunsheye; Tomori, Tugbiyele; in J. E. Thomas and Brian Elsey, (Eds.). International Biography of Adult Education. Nottingham: University of Nottingham: pp. 1, 3, 79–82, 89–92, 117–118, 374–375, 468–469, 469–472, 603–605 and 610–611.
- Omolewa, M. (1985). Current Trends in research on Adult and Community Education, in Bamgbose et al. (Eds.). Current Trends in Research. Lagos: Nigerian Educational Research Council.
- Omolewa, M. (1986). Certificate History of Nigeria. London and Lagos: Longman Publishers: p. viii and 264.
- Omolewa, M. and Eheazu B. (Eds.). (1986). The Right to Learn: Role of Non-Formal Education in Nigeria. Ibadan: NNCAE: pp. 280.
- Omolewa, M. (1987). Education Through the Rear View Mirror. Ibadan: Ibadan University Press: pp. 46.
- Akinpelu, J. A.; Okedara, J. T. and Omolewa, M. (Eds.). (1988). Language and Adult Education. Ibadan: Ibadan University Press: pp. 176.
- Akomolede, F. A. O.; Allen Taylor; Tunde, Egunyomi Tunbi; and Omolewa, M. (1988). Study Guide for External Studies Programme. Ibadan: Department of Adult Education: University of Ibadan: pp. 42.
- Akinpelu, J. A. and Omolewa M. A. (Eds.). (1989). 40 Years of Adult Education at Ibadan. Ibadan: Department of Adult Education: University of Ibadan: pp. 201.
- Omolewa, M. A. et al. (Eds.). (1989). J. S. Ogunlesi: 1902–1981. Ibadan: Ibadan University Press: pp. 82.
- Barkindo, B.; Omolewa, M.; Maduakor E. N. (1989). Africa and the Wider World Vol. 1: West and North Africa Since 1800. Lagos: Longman Nigeria: pp. 244.
- Omolewa, M. (1990). Myth and Reality of the Colonial Legacy In Nigerian Education, in Tamuno, T. N. and Atanda, J. A. (Eds.). Nigeria Since Independence: First 25 Years: Vol. 3. Ibadan: Heinemann Educational Books: pp. 9–34.
- Omolewa, M. (1990). Trends in the African Region, in UNESCO, Literacy and the Role of the University. Paris: UNESCO: pp. 50–61.
- Omolewa, M. (1991). The State and Adult Education: Historical Antecedents to the Directorate for Social Mobilisation in Nigeria. in J. I. Mereni (Ed.). Adult Education and Rural Transformation. Enugu: Asomog Printing and Publishing Press: pp. 1–11.
- Omolewa, M. (1991). Quality and Quantity in Community Development Programmes in Nigeria, in G. Adekanmbi and T. Fadeyi (Eds.). Improving the Quality of Community Development Projects in Nigeria. Ibadan: Department of Adult Education: University of Ibadan: pp. 13–18.
- Omolewa, M.; Adekanmbi, G. Adeola; O. A. Akinyele L. and Avoseh, M. B. M. (1992). Michael Imoudu: A Study of the Adventures in The Nigerian Labour Movement. Ilorin: Michael Imoudu Institute of Labour Studies: pp. 183.
- Barkindo, B.; M. Omolewa M.; Maduakor E. (1992). Africa and the Wider World, Since 1800. Lagos: Longman Nigeria.
- Omolewa M. (1992). Mass Literacy Campaigns in Nigeria: Present Problems and Future Prospects, in Adedoja et al. (Eds.). Issues in Nigerian Education: Vol. 2. Lagos: Text and Leisure Publishers: pp. 1–7.
- Barkindo, B.; Omolewa M.; Maduakor E. (1993). Africa and the Wider World, Vol. 3: Africa Since the Scramble. Lagos: Longman Nigeria.
- Omolewa, M. (1993). Trends in the Study of Education in Africa, in T. Falola, (Ed.).African Historiography: Essays in Honour of Jacob Ade-Ajayi. London and Lagos: Longman Group and Longman Nigeria: pp. 132–144.
- Omolewa, M. (1993). The Plausibility of Education for all by 2000, in Oriaifo, S. O. and Uche Gbenedio (Eds.). Towards Education in Nigeria for the 21st Century. Benin City: Institute of Education, University of Benin: pp. 66–75.
- Omolewa, M.; and Adekanmbi G. (Eds.). (1994). University Initiatives in Adult Education. Ibadan: Ibadan University Press: pp. 161.
- Omolewa, M. (1994). Each One Teach One Strategy for Mass Literacy Delivery in Nigeria, in Mass Literacy: 3 Perspectives. Lagos: National Commission for Mass Literacy: Adult and non-Formal Education: pp. 3–11.
- Omolewa, M. (1995). Historical Development of Adult Education in Africa: National University of Lesotho, Theory and Practice of Adult Education and Community Development in Africa. Roma: Germany Adult Education Association: pp. 1–13.
- Omolewa, M. (1996). An Overview of Adult Education Programmes in Africa, in S. O. Ayodele, (Ed.). Education for the Complete Man: Essays in Honour of Pai Obanya. Ibadan: Educational Research and Study Group: pp. 119–129.
- Omolewa, M. (1998). Adult Education Research in Africa: A Discourse on West African Initiatives since 1949, in Peter Drewek and C. Luth, (Eds.). History of Educational Studies. Gent: Paedagogical Historica: Supplement Series 3: pp. 537–557.
- Omolewa, M.; Adeola, O. A.; Adekanmbi, G.; Avoseh, M. B. M.; and Braimoh, D.; (1998). Literacy, Tradition and Progress: Recruitment and Retention in a Rural Literacy Programme. Hamburg: UNESCO Institute for Education: pp vii and 92.
- Omolewa, M. (1998). Chronology of Major Events in Adult Education: Nigeria, In Draper, J. A. (Ed.). Adult Education Chronologies in Commonwealth Africa. Bellville: University of the Western Cape: pp 54–64.
- Omolewa, M. (1998]) Literacy, Income Generation and Poverty Alleviation in Africa, in Omolewa M.; Osuji, E.; and Oduaran, A. (Eds.). Retrospect and Renewal: The State of Adult Education Research in Africa: Proceedings of the Inaugural Adult Education in Africa Workshop. Dakar: UNESCO Regional Office in Africa: pp. 75–81 and pp. 336.
- Omolewa, M. (2000). An Overview of the Faculty of Education, B. A. Mojuetan, (Ed.). 50 Years of the University of Ibadan. 50th Anniversary Committee: University of Ibadan Publishing House: pp. 53–78.
- Patel, Ila, (Ed.). (2001). Learning Opportunities for All: Trends in Adult Literacy Policy and Practice in Africa and Asia. New Delhi: Asian South Pacific Bureau of Adult Education (ASPBAE): pp. 75–123.
- Omolewa, M. (2001). The Challenge of Education in Nigeria: 1999 University Lecture. Ibadan: Ibadan University Press: pp. 95.
- Omolewa, M. (2002). Awolowo and Seven Years of Mass Education: Obafemi Awolowo: The End of An Era? Work: 1952–1959: A Study on the Question of Number in Education, in Olasope O. Oyelaran, Toyin Falola, Mokwugo Okoye, Adewale Thompson, (Eds.). University of Ife Press Ltd.: Ile-Ife: Nigeria: pp. 778–798.
- Omolewa, M. (2002). Education: Nigeria: Africa Atlases. Paris: Editions J. A.: 1st Edition: pp. 115–118.
- Omolewa, M. and Kellaghan, T. (2003). Educational Evaluation in Africa, in Kellaghan, T. and Stufflebeam, D. L. (Eds.). The International Handbook of Educational Evaluation: London: Kluwer Academic Publishers: Vol. 9. No. 1: pp. 465–481.
- Omolewa M. Honour Book: Oduaran, A. B. and Bhola, H. S. (Eds.). (2006). Widening Access to Education as Social Justice: Essays in Honour of Michael Omolewa. Springer and the UNESCO Institute for Education.
- Omolewa, M. (2006). Cross Over Unto the Other Side: The Mission of Adult Education: Valedictory Lecture. University of Ibadan: Ibadan: Tuesday 19 December '06: Spectrum Books Limited: pp. 1–49.
- Omolewa M. Book of Honour. Boucouvalas, M. and Aderinoye, A. (Eds.). (2008). Education for Millennium Development: Essays in Honour of Professor Michael Omolewa. University of Ibadan: Ibadan: Spectrum Books: Vol. 1: pp. 1–569 and Vol. 2: pp. 1–635.
- Omolewa, M. (2008). Preserving our Cultural Heritage through the Law: Thoughts of a Diplomat, in L. Fashola and T. Aderemi, (Eds.) An Adroit and Quintessential Jurist: Biography of Hon. Justice Pius Olayiwola Aderemi. Lagos: Lagel Blitz: pp. 255–283.
- Omolewa, M. (2010). Human Security in the African Context: The Education Imperative, in Obasanjo, Olusegun; Mabogunje Akin and Okebukola, Peter (Eds.). Human Security in Africa: Perspectives on Education, Health and Agriculture. Abeokuta: Olusegun Obasanjo Presidential Library: pp. 179–194.
- Omolewa, M. (2010). Highlights of Historical Development of Education in Nigeria, in Okojie, J.; Oloyede, I. and Obanya, Pai, (Eds.). 50 Years of University Education in Nigeria: Evolution, Achievements and Future Directions. Ilorin and Abuja: University of Ilorin and National Universities Commission: pp. 27–46.
- Omolewa, M. (2010). Education, in F. Abiola Irele and Biodun Jeyifo (Eds.). Oxford Encyclopedia of African Thought: Oxford University Press: pp. 331–335.
- Omolewa, M. (2012). The Words of Psalm 23: Reflections of a Teacher on A Psalm of David. Wine Press Publishers, Enumclaw, Washington: United States of America.

=== Articles in journals ===
- Omolewa, M. (1974). Adult Readers in Nigerian Libraries, 1932–1960: A Study of Library Use in Colonial Nigeria. Nigerian Libraries Vol. 10: Nos. 1: pp. 29–40.
- Omolewa, M. A. (1974). The Foundations of Adult Education Institutions in Nigeria, 1923–1960: A Study of the Objectives of Adult Education in Colonial Nigeria. Bulletin of the Association of African Universities, Vol. 1: No 2: November, pp. 44–51.
- Omolewa, M. (1975). Oxford University and the Planting of Adult Education in Nigeria, 1945–50. Journal of Educational Administration and History, Vol. vii: No. 1: pp. 23–39.
- Omolewa M. (1975). A Decade of University Adult Education in Nigeria, 1954–55: An Examination of British Influence. British Journal of Educational Studies, Vol. xxiii: No. 2: pp. 34–67.
- Omolewa, M. (1975). The English Language in Colonial Nigeria, 1862–1960: A Study of the Major Factors which promoted the Language. Journal of the Nigerian English Studies Association, Vol. 7: Nos. 1 and 2: pp. 103–117.
- Omolewa, M. (1976). London University's Earliest Examinations in Nigeria 1887–1931. West African Journal of Education Vol. 20, No. 2: pp. 347–360.
- Omolewa, M. (1976). The Adaptation Question in Nigerian Education, 1916–1936. Journal of the Historical Society of Nigeria. Vol. 8: No. 3: pp. 93–119.
- Omolewa, M. (1977). Neglected Materials in British Archives on the History of Education in Nigeria. History of Education Bulletin. No. 19: pp. 51–54.
- Omolewa, M. (1977). External Examinations and the Development of Secondary Schools in Africa. Bulletin of the Association of African Universities. Vol. 3: pp. 102–115.
- Omolewa, M. (1977). Cambridge University Local Examinations Syndicate and the Development of Secondary Education in Nigeria, 1910–1926. Journal of the Historical Society of Nigeria. Vol. 8: No. 4: pp. 111–130.
- Omolewa, M. (1977). The Question of University Leadership in Secondary Education Nigeria. International Review of Education. Vol. XXIV: No. 1: pp. 35–52.
- Omolewa, M. (1977). Some Earliest Problems of Science Education in Nigeria. Journal of the Science Association of Nigeria, pp. 72–84.
- Omolewa, M. (1978). Dahomey Immigrants in Nigeria. Nigeria Magazine. No. 126-127, pp. 60–65.
- Omolewa, M. (1978). Oxford University Delegacy of Local Examinations and the development of Secondary Education in Nigeria, 1929–1937. Journal of Educational Administration and History. Vol. X. No. 2: pp. 39–44.
- Omolewa, M. (1978). Correspondence Education in Nigeria: 1915–1975. Vierteljahresberichte: Probleme der Entwicklungslander, No. 2: pp. 157–164.
- Omolewa, M. (1978). The Teaching of French and German in Nigerian Schools: 1859–1959. Cahiers d'Etudes Africaines Vol. XVIII: No.3: pp. 379–396.
- Omolewa, M. (1978). The Ascendancy of English in Nigerian Schools. 1882–1960. West African Journal of Modern Languages. No. 3: pp. 86–97.
- Omolewa, M. (1978). Seventh Day Adventist Work in Nigeria: 1914–1960. Religions: Journal of the Nigerian Association for the Study of Religions. Vol. 3: pp. 3–14.
- Omolewa, M. (1978). Periodicals on Educational Matters in Nigeria, 1927–1954. Nigerian Libraries. Vol. 14, Nos. 1–3: pp. 152–166.
- Omolewa, M. (1978). Elder D. C. Babcock: 1854–1932: Pioneer of the Seventh Day Adventist Missionary Work in Nigeria. Orita. Vol. XII, No 2: pp. 113–142.
- Omolewa, M. (1978). The Rationale for the Use of External Examiners in the Conduct of University Examinations: The Case of the University of Ibadan. Overseas Universities. No. 25: pp. 19–24.
- Omolewa, M. (1979). On the Writing of The History of Education in Nigeria. Journal of the Historical Society of Nigeria. Vol. X, No. 1: pp. 125–142.
- Akinpelu, Jones A. and Omolewa, Michael. (1980). Towards Mass Literacy: Development of Programmes; Choosing Priorities. Federal Ministry of Education, Nigeria. Towards the National Mass Literacy Campaign, Lagos: pp. 34–41.
- Omolewa, M. (1980). The Promotion of London's Universities Examination in Nigeria: 1887–1951. International Journal of African Historical Studies: Vol. 13 No. 4: pp. 651–671.
- Omolewa, M. (1980). The Teaching and Learning of History in Nigerian Schools: 1882–1957. Ife Journal of African Educational Studies, Vol. 1: No. 1: pp. 43–62.
- Omolewa, M. (1980). Origins and Developments of the Mass Literacy Education in Nigeria. Adult Education and Development: No. 14: pp. 39–44.
- Omolewa, M. (1980). A critique of Mass Literacy Education in Nigeria. Viereteljahresberichte Probleme der Entwicklungslander: No. 21: pp. 253–265.
- Omolewa, M. (1980). Examinations and Qualifications System in The Third World: German Translation: Das Prufungs-und Berechtigunsewsen in der Dritten Velt. Zeitschrift fur Padagogik: 16: pp. 197–208.
- Omolewa, M. (1980). Mass Literacy Campaigns in Nigeria: 1940–1960. Indian Journal of Adult Education: Vol. 41: No. 9: September: pp. 15–23.
- Omolewa, M. (1980). The Education Factor in the Emergence of the Modern Profession of History in Nigeria: 1926–1956. Special Silver Jubilee Issue: Journal of the Historical Society of Nigeria. Vol. X: No. 10: pp. 41–62.

=== Technical reports ===
- Omolewa, M.; Adeola, O. A.; Adekanmbi, G.; Avoseh, M. B. and Braimoh, D. (1991). Enrolment and Retention in a Rural Literacy Programme. Submitted to UNESCO Institute for Education. Received Honourable Mention on the International Award for Literacy Research Competition.
- Omolewa, M.; Bamgboye, O.; Fasokun, T. O.; Alfa, M.; Paiko, J.; Adewunmi, I. and Ilori, S. (1992). Report of the Study Group on Continuing Education. Submitted to the FGN/EEC: Federal Government of Nigeria/European Economic Community Middle Belt Programme, Ilorin.
- Omolewa, Adeola, Adekanmbi, Akomolede, Fadeyi (1994). A Kii Dagba Eko: It's never too late to learn. Ibadan, Community Development, Literacy and Health Project.
- Omolewa, M. and A. B. Oduaran (1995). Literacy Programmes Development and Evaluation in Africa: A Manual. Codat Publications, Ibadan, Nigeria.
- Omolewa, Aderinoye, Fadeyi, Adeniran, Ajala (1996). University Village Association English Primer. Department of Adult Education: University of Ibadan.
- Omolewa, Aderinoye, Fadeyi, Adeniran, Ajala (1996). Reading for Development. University Village Association, Ibadan.
- Omolewa, Onocha, Egunyomi, Daniel-Okiei, Sarumi (1996). Teaching Kit for Non-Formal Education. Submitted to UNICEF: Ibadan.
- Omolewa, Onocha, Egunyomi, Sarumi, Fadeyi (1996). Report on a Survey of Learning Needs of Adolescent Girls in Bodija Market. Submitted to UNICEF: Ibadan.
- Omolewa, Ihebuzor, Aderinoye, eds. (1997). Facilitators' Manual for Real Literacy and Learners Generated Materials. British Council Commissioned. Ibadan. University Village Association.

=== Forthcoming commissioned works ===
- Omolewa, M.; Karani, Florida and Nikiema, Norbert (2014). History of Adult Education in Africa. DVV International, UNESCO Institute of Lifelong Learning and Pearson Publishers, South Africa.
- Omolewa, M. (2014). Out of Africa: African Universities since 1913. Contribution to the Special Centenary publication of the Association of Commonwealth Universities. Guest Editor: Deryck Schreuder. Sage Publications: London, United Kingdom.
