= Akinyele (name) =

Nigerian given name

- Gender: Male
- Language: Yoruba

Origin
- Origin: Yoruba
- Meaning: “valor is worthy of the house.”
- Region of origin: South-west Nigeria

Other names
- Variant forms: Yele; Akin

AkinyeleAkinyele is a masculine given name and surname of Yoruba origin, widely used in southwestern Nigeria. The name combines three Yoruba words: “akin" (valor or bravery), “yẹ” (befitting or worthy of), and “ilé” (home, or household). This translates to “valor is worthy of the house". Morphologically, it is written as akin-yẹ-ilé.

== Notable people with the name and surname ==
- Akinyele Umoja (born 1954) American educator
- Akinyele (rapper) (born 1971) American rapper
- Alexander Akinyele (1875 - 1968) Nigerian clergy
- Isaac Babalola Akinyele (1882 - 1964)
- Theophilus Adeleke Akinyele (1932 - 2020) Nigerian business consultant.
- Rufus Akinyele (born 1959) Nigerian professor.
