= Timeline of the 2006 Lebanon War (July) =

This is a timeline of the 2006 Lebanon War during the month of July.

== 12 July ==
Hezbollah
- At about 9 a.m. local time Hezbollah launched Katyusha rockets across the Lebanese border with Israel as a diversionary tactic, targeting the town of Shlomi and outposts in the Shebaa Farms area. At the same time Hezbollah's military wing staged a cross-border attack in northern Israel on two Israeli Humvees. Three Israeli soldiers were killed, two wounded, and two were captured and taken into Lebanon.
- Hezbollah claimed its objective is "to free 10,000 Arabs captured by Israel"."Fulfilling its pledge to liberate the Arab prisoners and detainees, the Islamic Resistance... captured two Israeli soldiers (Ehud Goldwasser and Eldad Regev) at the border with occupied Palestine", Hezbollah said in a statement.
- Hezbollah's attacks draw international condemnation. The United States, European Union, Japan, UK, Egypt and UN call for the immediate unconditional release of two kidnapped Israeli soldiers. The Syrian government and Hamas praise the attack by Hezbollah.
Lebanon
- Lebanese ambassador to the U.S. Farid Abboud was recalled to Beirut following controversial comments in support of Hezbollah made on CNN. Officials in Beirut claimed that Abboud's view had not represented that of Lebanon, which is opposed to Hezbollah's actions on Israel's northern border.
United States
- The United States condemned what they call Hezbollah's "unprovoked act of terrorism" by saying: "Today Hezbollah terrorists operating from Lebanon kidnapped two Israeli soldiers and launched rocket attacks against civilian targets in Israel. The United States condemns in the strongest terms this unprovoked act of terrorism, which was timed to exacerbate already high tensions in the region and sow further violence. We also hold Syria and Iran, which have provided long-standing support for Hezbollah, responsible for today's violence. We call for the immediate and unconditional release of the Israeli soldiers."
- The United States blame Syria and Iran for the kidnapping of the two Israeli soldiers.
Israel
- In attempt to pursue the Hezbollah force and release the captured soldiers, an Israeli Merkava Mark II tank was hit by a 200–300 kilogram mine. All 4 crew members were killed. In an attempt to recover the bodies of the soldiers from the burnt tank, another Israeli soldier was hit by Hezbollah fire and killed.
- Israel files a complaint with the UN Security Council and UN Secretary General Kofi Annan, urging the international community to enforce council resolutions calling on the Lebanese government to disarm all militias within its borders and to extend its authority throughout its territory and specifically to southern Lebanon and its border with Israel.
- Israel retaliated by ground, air and sea attacks. In addition to air strikes on Hezbollah positions, the IDF targeted numerous roads and bridges in southern Lebanon. At least 12 bridges were hit, one Lebanese civilian as well as one Hezbollah fighter were killed. An IDF reserve armoured division is called up in preparation for large scale operations in Lebanon, raising concerns for war.
- Israeli prime minister Ehud Olmert describes the Hezbollah attacks as "unjustified acts of war" by Lebanon and promises a "very painful and far-reaching response".

== 13 July ==
Israel
- Impose blockade on Lebanon.
Israel
- Israel imposes an air and sea blockade on Lebanon. Israeli fighters attack the Beirut–Damascus Highway, closing the country's main artery and further isolating Lebanon from the outside world.
- Attack at 7:45 on Beirut's Rafic Hariri International Airport – two main runways damaged.
- Attack on Rayak Air Base in the Bekaa Valley near the Syrian border, destroying runways, the first attack against Lebanon's army in the 2006 Lebanon war.
- Attack small military airport in Qulayaat in northern Lebanon.
- Israel destroys Hezbollah headquarters and home of its head Hassan Nasrallah in southern Beirut, following repeated early warnings to local civilians.
- Some 220,000 Israeli civilians spend the night in bomb shelters, after two civilians were killed in rocket attacks. 14 Israelis, including 4 children, remain hospitalized following yesterday's rocket attacks.
Hezbollah
- Hezbollah bombarded the Israeli towns of Nahariya and Safed as well as villages nearby, with about 90 9K51 Grad rockets. The attacks killed two civilians and wounded 29 more.
- Nasrallah vows to fight "open war" on Israel, striking towns "beyond Haifa".
- Haifa city is hit by rocket artillery fired from Lebanon. Israeli Ambassador to the United States Daniel Ayalon describes the unprecedented strike on Haifa as a "major, major escalation" by Hezbollah.
Lebanon
- Lebanon announces its refusal to abide UN Security Council's Resolutions 1559 and 1583, calling Lebanon to assert full control over its border with Israel.

== 14 July ==
Hezbollah
- Fired dozens of Katyusha rockets into northern Israel reaching Haifa.
- Fired two Iranian built C-701 Cruise Missiles of Chinese design – one damages an Israeli Sa'ar 5-class missile boat, the INS Hanit, killing four crew members. The other missile damages a civilian vessel of Egyptian registry. It is later debated whether Hezbollah or Iranian military personnel fired the cruise missiles.
- Hezbollah leader Hassan Nasrallah said that Hezbollah is ready for "open war" with Israel.
Iran
- Mahmoud Ahmadinejad, the president of Iran, warned Israel of a "fierce response" if it attacks Syria.
Syria
- The ruling party in Syria, Baath, said that Syria fully backs Hezbollah against the "barbaric Israeli aggression".
United States
- US president George W. Bush has said he will urge Israel to avoid civilian casualties in its attacks on Lebanon, but he's "not going to make military decisions for Israel". (Haaretz), (BBC NEWS).
IDF

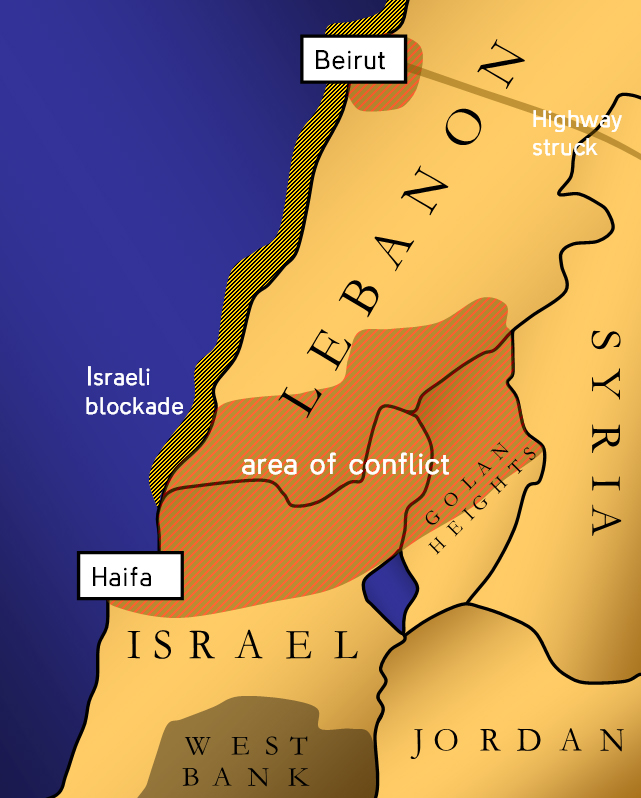
Map of conflict as of 14 July 2006. In yellow is the Israeli blockade, in the red area regions of active conflict.

- Bombs the airport road in the south of the capital, Beirut.
- Drops leaflets warning residents to stay away from the Hezbollah offices in southern Beirut, where Hezbollah leader Hassan Nasrallah is thought to live.
- Bombs the main highway between Beirut and the Syrian capital of Damascus.
- Attacked the al-Manar television station. A broadcast tower was destroyed and three people were injured, but the station continued its broadcasts.
- Warships set up a blockade, preventing cruise ships from docking in Beirut and cutting off the delivery of fuel used to operate Lebanese power plants.
- Airstrikes and artillery shelling of hundreds of targets in Lebanon.
- Struck the Beirut airport, where helicopter gunships damaged runways and destroyed fuel tanks.
- Bombs the Jiyeh power station

Israel

- Israeli prime minister Ehud Olmert outlined three conditions for the Israeli operation to end: full implementation of United Nations Security Council Resolution 1559 calling for the disarming of Hezbollah, an end to rocket attacks from Lebanon on Israeli towns, and the return of the two abducted soldiers.

== 15 July ==
IDF
- Warships bombard Beirut's lighthouse and four ports.
- Air force fired a missile at a van in southern Lebanon, killing 20 people, among them 15 children.
- Raids on north, east and south Lebanon killed 15 people and wounded 37.
- Lebanon's main commercial ports of Beirut and Tripoli were attacked, as well as ports in the Christian towns of Jounieh and Amsheet.
- One Lebanese soldier was killed when an army radar station was hit in Batroun north of Beirut.
- Warplanes flattened Hezbollah's nine-story headquarters and destroyed the office of a Hamas leader, Mohammed Nazzal. Nazzal survived the attack.
- Israeli navy gunships bombarded an electric power station on the coast at Jiyeh power station, about 25 km south of Beirut.
- Israel Air Force strikes Hezbollah targets and facilities in Lebanon. An Israeli general says all Lebanese coastal radars were destroyed, after they took part in the attack on an Israeli missile boat on Friday, killing 4 soldiers.
Artists
- Lebanese artist Mazen Kerbaj took his trumpet to his apartment's balcony and recorded an improvisational duet with the Israeli military force. Later, he titled this sound piece "Starry Night."
Hezbollah
- Fires 20 rockets into Haifa, killing 8 and wounding 20. 10 rockets also fired into Tiberius for the first time, forcing many displaced Israeli civilians who came to the city for shelter from northern cities farther south – total of more than a hundred Katyusha. Israeli defense minister Amir Peretz is about to sign a "home front emergency" declaration, enabling local security forces to shut down schools and close certain areas for traffic, narrowing the damages of the expanding fighting.
United Nations
- United Nations Security Council turns down for now a Lebanese request to impose a cease-fire. Israeli prime minister Ehud Olmert told UN Secretary-General Kofi Annan that Israel would not end its military operation in Lebanon until the implementation of UNSC Resolution 1559, which calls for disarming Hezbollah and the deployment of the Lebanese army in southern Lebanon. (Haaretz), (SF Gate)
United States
- US president George W. Bush calls for Syria to urge Hezbollah to "lay down its arms and to stop attacking". Russian defense minister Sergei Ivanov calls Hezbollah to "cease using terrorist methods, including attacks on neighboring countries".
- The presidents of the United States and Russia differ in emphasis in voicing concern about the Lebanon crisis at the 32nd G8 summit in Strelna.

== 16 July ==
Hezbollah
- Nazareth and Afula are hit by Hezbollah rockets, reaching the deepest of all rockets fired by the militant group.
- Hezbollah rockets hit the major Israeli city of Haifa, killing 8 civilians and wounding 17. Local train lines and universities closed down.
Israel
- Israel increases the alert level in Tel Aviv in preparation to further attacks.

IDF

- Lebanon security officials claim that an Israeli air strike on Tyre kills at least 16 people and wounds 42.
- 25 Lebanese are killed in Israeli Air Force strikes in southern Lebanon. Among the dead were seven Canadians, with six other Canadians critically wounded.
- Air attacks on Beirut's southern suburbs, continued through the day and evening.
See also: Haret Hreik

== 17 July ==
IDF
- Israeli air strikes targeted a Hezbollah stronghold in Lebanon, which killed 17 combatants. Hezbollah retaliated by firing away Katyusha rockets thirty-five miles south of the Lebanese border, which landed in the northern Israeli town of Atlit; although, there were no casualties reported.
- Some Israeli ground troops briefly entered into Lebanon, its southern portion, with the intent of completing a mission of attacking Hezbollah bases on the border.
- At least 10 Lebanese have died in an Israeli attack on their vehicles in the south of the country, sources say.(BBC NEWS)
- Israel extends its air campaign to northernmost Lebanon, killing at least 14, among them 9 soldiers, after Hezbollah rockets hit Haifa. (BBC), (Haaretz), (Al-Jazeera)
- Israel claims to have destroyed a long-range Iranian missile capable of hitting Tel Aviv in an airstrike on Lebanon. (India Daily)
United Nations / United Kingdom
- U.N. Secretary General Kofi Annan and UK Prime Minister Tony Blair urge an international stabilization force to the Mideast to stop the cross-border fighting. Israel responds that it is too early to call for a UN force.
Hezbollah
- Three rounds of Hezbollah rockets struck the Israeli port city of Haifa, that wounded two people and partially destroyed a three-story building.
- Rockets were also reported to have hit the town of Atlit, 35 miles south of the border and 5 miles south of Haifa. No injuries were reported.
- Zeev Hospital at Zefat was damaged by a rocket of Hezbollah
Israel
- During a speech to the Knesset Israeli prime minister Ehud Olmert said: "Israel will not agree to live under the threat of missiles or rockets aimed at its citizens. Citizens of Israel, there are moments in a nation's life where it must face reality and say: Enough! And I am telling you all. It is enough."
- Israel has rebuffed a UN call for an international monitoring force to be deployed in Lebanon as it continued to attack the country.
Canada
- Canadians gather in front of the Israeli consulate in Montreal to protest the Israeli airstrikes in Lebanon.
United States
- An estimated 10,000 demonstrators rallied outside the United Nations in New York City in support of Israel, with smaller crowds of anti-Israel protesters also present.

== 18 July ==
Israel
- Prime Minister of Israel Ehud Olmert vows to keep fighting until the captured soldiers are released and Israeli citizens are safe. (ABC News America)
- Israel closes Haifa's port after Hezbollah rockets rain on the port-city, wounding two people.
IDF
- Israel continues its air strikes across Lebanon. The attacks kill 11 Lebanese soldiers in their army barracks east of Beirut.
- Israel intercepts a rocket shipment from Syria to Hezbollah.
Hezbollah
- Hezbollah rockets again strike Haifa, wounding several Israelis.
Saudi Arabia
- Saudi Arabia says it will support the deployment of an international military force to stabilize Lebanon.
Global –
- Western governments evacuate their citizens from Lebanon any way they can.
- The Nikkei 225 stock market index falls by 2.8 percent due to uncertainty in the Middle East. (Bloomberg)

== 19 July ==
UN
- Hostilities between Israel and Hezbollah militants in Lebanon must stop immediately, UN Secretary General Kofi Annan has said.
IDF
- Israeli warplanes attack bunker in south Beirut believed to contain Hezbollah leaders.
- Israeli ground troops cross the border into Lebanon in a limited incursion.
- Israeli airstrikes hit the southern suburbs of Beirut near the airport.
- Two Israeli soldiers have been killed in fierce fighting with Hezbollah guerrillas in southern Lebanon.
Lebanon
- A cruise ship carrying 1000 Americans leaves Beirut for Cyprus as the fighting enters its second week.
- At least 55 civilians have been killed in Israeli air strikes in Lebanon.
Hezbollah
- Hezbollah continues to fire rockets into Israeli civilian cities. Rockets hit the Arab city of Nazareth killing two civilian Muslim boys.

== 20 July ==
IDF
- Four IDF soldiers were killed and six others were wounded during intense fighting with Hezbollah forces near Moshav Avivim, just inside south Lebanon.
- One soldier was killed and three soldiers were injured late night on 20 July when two Apache helicopters collided in northern Israel, near Kiryat Shmona.
Hezbollah
- Hezbollah fired mortar shells in the area to slow the evacuation of wounded Israeli soldiers. It was claimed by the IDF that several Hezbollah fighters were killed in the battle.
UN
- Hostilities between Israel and Hezbollah militants in Lebanon must stop immediately, UN Secretary General Kofi Annan has said.

== 21 July ==
IDF
- Israel calls up several reserve army battalions and drops leaflets over southern Lebanese villages warning civilians to leave the area.
- Brigadier-General Alon Friedman, who is in charge of Israeli army operations in the north, said: "It's possible that in the coming days our ground operations will increase.
- The Israeli air force continues to hit targets around Lebanon. More than 300 Lebanese civilians had been reported killed in the raids.
- Israel moves thousands of troops to the Lebanese border including reserves to deal with fierce fighting.
- Israel is continuing its Lebanon military offensive, with war planes bombing more than 40 targets, mainly in southern parts of Beirut, on Friday.
Hezbollah
- Hezbollah launch fewer rockets than on any day since the conflict began. Only 40 rockets reach Israel.
UN
- The UN-led call for a ceasefire is blocked by the United States, UK and Israel.
US
- United States Secretary of State Condoleezza Rice was reported to outline a plan for a diplomatic solution to the crisis and will tour the area next week.

== 22 July ==
IDF
- Israel carried out air strikes and small-scale incursions into Lebanon, as troops and tanks gather on the border.
- Israel massed soldiers and tanks on the border with Lebanon and called up thousands of reserve troops, in a possible prelude to a ground offensive.
- Israeli ground troops move into the village of Maroun al-Ras in south Lebanon and take control. The Israeli army insists that incursions will be limited in scope despite the recall of thousands of reserve troops.
Hezbollah
- Hezbollah rockets again strike Haifa, wounding several Israelis.
- Israel continues its offensive by hitting communications targets in Lebanon, including a relay station used by several Lebanese television stations.
- Hezbollah fires at least 150 rockets hitting several cities and villages in northern Israel.
- 17 people wounded Saturday as 160 Katyushas land in north; 4 people hurt in strike on Safed home.
United States
- Washington rushes a delivery of precision-guided bombs to Israel, according to The New York Times.
- Condoleezza Rice, the US secretary of state, describes the plight of Lebanon as part of the "birth pangs of a new Middle East" and says that Israel should ignore calls for a ceasefire.
European Union
- The European Union sends experts to Cyprus to help coordinate provision of emergency humanitarian aid to Lebanon.
- Thousands of people across the UK demonstrated against Israeli attacks on Lebanon.

== 23 July ==
Israel
- Israel and the United States say they would accept NATO forces deployed along the Lebanese/Israeli border.
- Two Israeli civilians are killed by Hezbollah rocket attacks on Haifa. More than 2200 rockets have been fired at Israeli cities since the beginning of the conflict, killing 17 Israelis, all of them civilians. 20 Israeli soldiers were killed in other incidents.
Hezbollah
- 80 rockets fired at northern Israel by late afternoon Sunday (Haaretz)
- Two killed in Katyusha rocket strikes on north
- Carmiel, Acre, Tiberias, Kiryat Shmona also hit; 11 hurt in Haifa, 1 in Carmiel; French foreign minister takes cover in Haifa.
Lebanon

About 300 Lebanese, most of them civilians, have been killed in the conflict.

UN
- The UN's Jan Egeland has condemned the devastation caused by Israeli air strikes in Beirut, saying it is a violation of humanitarian law.(BBC NEWS)

== 24 July ==
Hezbollah
- Hezbollah leader Hassan Nasrallah announces in an interview with Al-Jazeera that he discussed the abduction of the two Israeli soldiers with Lebanese political leaders before the attack occurred.
United States
- Condoleezza Rice proposed a first ambitious plan in which international military forces would help the Lebanese government stabilize southern Lebanon, Lebanese political sources said. The plan would involve putting an international force of up to 10,000 Turkish and Egyptian troops under a NATO or U.N. commander into southern Lebanon following a cease-fire, the Lebanese political sources said. Another international force of up to 30,000 troops then would help the Lebanese government regain control over the region, the sources said. Rice presented the plan to Lebanese officials, the sources said, and will show it to European foreign ministers 26 July in Rome, Italy. U.S. and diplomatic sources said Lebanese officials are leaking details of the proposal because they are opposed to many of them. The sources describe the plan as an outline or working proposal and said no one has agreed to it. They also said there are many hurdles to overcome before it could be implemented.
IDF
- Israel has used artillery-fired cluster munitions in populated areas of Lebanon, Human Rights Watch said. Researchers on the ground in Lebanon confirmed that a cluster munitions attack on the village of Blida on 19 July killed one and wounded at least 12 civilians, including seven children. Human Rights Watch researchers also photographed cluster munitions in the arsenal of Israeli artillery teams on the Israel-Lebanon border. "Cluster munitions are unacceptably inaccurate and unreliable weapons when used around civilians," said Kenneth Roth, executive director of Human Rights Watch. "They should never be used in populated areas."
Iran
- Iran's President, Mahmoud Ahmadinejad, warns Israel over its actions in Lebanon.

== 25 July ==
Hezbollah
- Over 140 rockets fired at northern Israel within 24 hours Hezbollah leader Hassan Nasrallah threatened to take the Islamic militia's fight against Israel "beyond Haifa"—the northern Israeli city that is a frequent target of Hezbollah. In Israel, a Katyusha rocket killed a 15-year-old girl in the village of Meghar, Israeli police and medical service officials said. At least 18 people were injured in the port city of Haifa and one man died of a heart attack after a rocket struck near his home, officials said. About 100 Hezbollah rockets were fired into Israel, striking the cities of Haifa, Karmiel, Qiryat Shemona and Nahariya, according to the IDF. Huge explosions reverberated afternoon through the southern suburbs of Beirut—a Hezbollah stronghold—sending smoke billowing through high-rise buildings.
IDF
- Israeli Defense Forces starts its attempt to take the southern Lebanese town of Bint Jbeil, which it regarded as a "Hezbollah stronghold." The IDF said it had taken control of the city.
- Israeli airstrike kills four UN observers in southern Lebanon. Israel has said the attack was an accident.But U.N. Secretary-General Kofi Annan contended otherwise. United Nations Secretary-General Kofi Annan called the strike "apparently deliberate." An overnight Israeli airstrike hit a house in the village of Nabatiye, killing seven people, Lebanese security sources said. The Israel Defense Forces also said it killed senior Hezbollah commander Abu Jaafar, who Israel says was in charge of the central area of Lebanon's border with Israel. CNN was not able to confirm the report and there has been no confirmation from Hezbollah. The IDF hopes to create a "security zone" in southern Lebanon until an international force arrives, said Israeli defense minister Amir Peretz. "If there is not a multinational force that will get in to control the fences, we will continue to control with our fire towards anyone that gets close to the defined security zone and they will know that they can be hurt", he said. Several Israeli strikes hit the Lebanese coastal city of Tyre. There was no official word yet on casualties.
Israel
- Israeli prime minister Ehud Olmert said: "Let it be clear, we will reach everyone, no matter where they are, and we shall not hesitate to take the most severe measures against those aiming thousands of rockets and missiles against innocent civilians, with a single purpose in mind – to kill them. This is something we shall not tolerate."
- At least 41 Israelis have died, including 19 civilians, and at least 388 have been wounded, Israeli officials said.
- Israeli officials agreed during talks with Condoleezza Rice to make it easier to get humanitarian aid into Lebanon, a U.S. State Department official said. Lebanese officials have pleaded with the United States to pressure Israel for an immediate cease-fire, but U.S. officials said conditions are not yet ripe for such a move, and they expect Israeli military operations to continue for another week or even longer.
United States
- U.S. secretary of state Condoleezza Rice proposed an ambitious plan in which international military forces would help the Lebanese government stabilize southern Lebanon, Lebanese political sources said. Rice pitched the plan to Israeli prime minister Ehud Olmert in Jerusalem, then traveled to the West Bank city of Ramallah for talks with Palestinian Authority President Mahmoud Abbas. U.S. ambassador Jeffrey D. Feltman delivered $30 million in humanitarian aid to Lebanon, which will meet the basic medical needs of 20,000 people, according to an embassy statement. The shipment was handed over to the International Committee of the Red Cross at the U.S. Embassy in Beirut at afternoon. The U.S. announcement followed a U.N. appeal for nearly $150 million in humanitarian aid earlier this week.

== 26 July ==
Hezbollah
- Nine IDF soldiers are killed "in the hardest day of fighting in southern Lebanon since the war began"; eight from the Golani Brigade, in the Battle of Bint Jbail, and one from Paratroopers Brigade, in the village of Maroun al-Ras.
- Over 75 rockets fired at Israel during the day; No less than 22 hit within urban areas
- Over 100 rockets hit communities across north; 13 lightly wounded There were heavy casualties among Hezbollah fighters, according to Israeli soldiers. Hezbollah has not released casualty figures since fighting began. Hezbollah fighters launched 102 rockets into Israel in the morning, wounding 18 people, Israeli police said. Twenty-seven of the rockets landed in cities, the police said. CNN learned that Hezbollah isn't the only militia in Lebanon fighting Israeli troops. Officials with the Amal Party, headed by speaker of the Lebanese parliament Nabih Berri, said militias loyal to Berri have been involved in every major battle since fighting began. Amal is a Shiite political and paramilitary organization, like Hezbollah, and fought against Israel in the 1990s during the occupation of southern Lebanon. Eight Amal fighters have been killed in the past three days, during which Berri met with U.S. secretary of state Condoleezza Rice to discuss a solution to the crisis.
United Nations
- UN peacekeepers in south Lebanon contacted Israeli troops 10 times before an Israeli bomb killed four of them, an initial UN report says. Four United Nations observers were killed in an Israeli air strike on an observation post in south Lebanon.
- The UN Security Council proposed the condemnation of the Israeli attack on the UNIFIL outpost. However, this was prevented by the veto of the U.S. After the 25 July incident, U.N. Secretary-General Kofi Annan called the strike "apparently deliberate", a charge Israel has vehemently denied. Annan said the U.N. wanted to conduct a joint investigation into the deaths along with Israel. But the Security Council statement called only for Israel to take U.N. material into account during its investigation. U.N. officials repeatedly told Israeli commanders to direct their fire away from the post before the observers were killed, Jane Lute, assistant secretary-general for peacekeeping operations, told Security Council members. A U.N. officer said the Israeli military liaison was told 10 times in six hours that aerial attacks were getting close to the bunker manned by the U.N. Interim Force in Lebanon. U.S. ambassador to the United Nations John Bolton said Israel was investigating the bombing. "The government of Israel has definitively said that they were not deliberately targeting the UNIFIL outpost", he said. "We certainly take them at their word and note that there's no evidence to the contrary." The international U.N. force in southern Lebanon comprises 2,000 troops—including 50 military observers—and 400 civilians. It has been there since 1978 to observe the Israeli withdrawal from Lebanon, maintain security and eventually return authority over the area to the Lebanese government."

UN Secretary General Kofi Annan has called for an "immediate cessation of hostilities" in the Middle East.

IDF
- The Israeli military suffered its largest loss of life in its 15-day offensive against Hezbollah guerrillas as nine Israeli soldiers were killed while fighting in southern Lebanese towns. The battle of Bint Jbail intensifies. Eight soldiers were killed and 22 more were wounded in Bint Jbeil, near the Israeli border, while battling militiamen in what the Israel Defense Forces has called Hezbollah's "terror capital." More troops were being sent to Bint Jbeil. In nearby Maroun al-Ras, an Israeli army officer was killed and five soldiers were wounded in fighting, according to the IDF. On the Mediterranean coast, 10 people were injured in the Lebanese port city of Tyre when Israeli airstrikes destroyed a 10-story building, city officials said. Smoke rose over the city after two large explosions, and people near the building were covered in dust and blood as they fled through the rubble. The blast came just hours after a ship with hundreds of foreigners aboard departed the seaport in Tyre. Residents in Tyre said they were concerned that Israeli airstrikes would intensify after the Westerners left. The ship, chartered by Canada, was bound for Cyprus filled with Americans, Australians, Britons, Canadians and other nationalities. Israeli Maj. Gen. Udi Adam said the building was targeted because "there are launchers [there] that fire missiles at Haifa." Haifa, the third-largest city in Israel, has been the target of numerous air attacks. Adam also told reporters that an end to the fighting may be near. "I assume that it will go on for a few more weeks", he said. "And in a few more weeks, I believe we will be able to put an end to this operation – a successful end."
- Israeli troops have been involved in fierce ground fighting in Lebanese border towns since entering Maroun al-Ras last week. The goal, according to the IDF, is to push Hezbollah guerrillas away from the border and reduce the Islamic militia's capability to launch Katyusha rockets into northern Israel.
Lebanon
- Since 12 July, at least 398 people—mostly civilians—have been killed in Israeli strikes, Lebanese sources say. The fighting also has wounded more than 1,400 in Lebanon.
United States
- Talks in Rome, Italy, floundered after the United States disagreed with European and Arab nations over how to defuse the situation, according to sources in Washington, D.C. and Jerusalem. The United States has resisted demands for an immediate cease-fire, insisting that a cessation of hostilities must be part of a wider plan to permanently disarm Hezbollah. Arab and European leaders say the violence must stop first. Meanwhile, Israel, which was not invited to participate in the talks, said it hoped "the international community will act immediately to strengthen the Lebanese army" so the army can take charge of southern Lebanon after the talks.

== 27 July ==
Lebanon

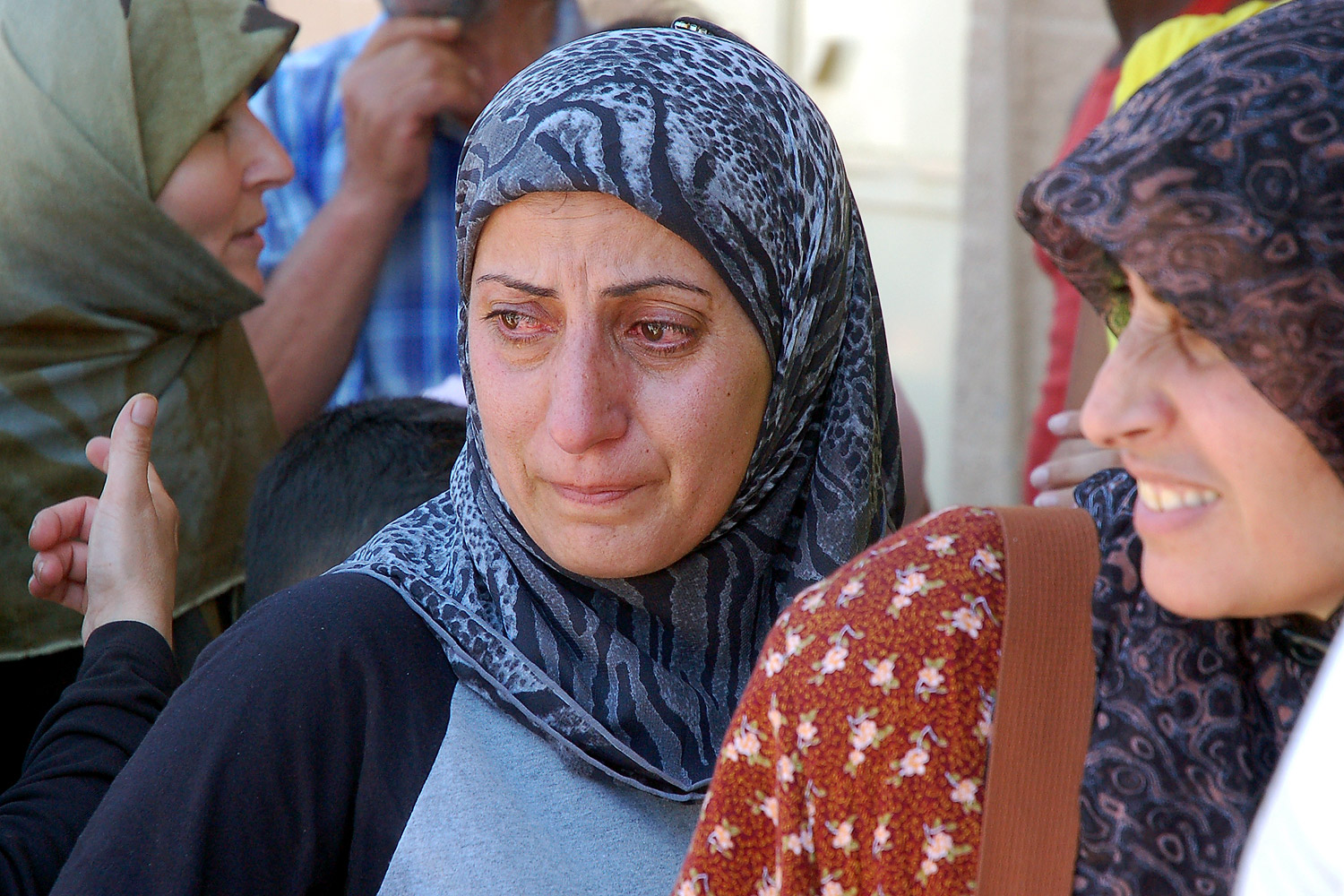
Lebanese displaced in south Lebanon on 27 July

- Lebanon's prime minister Fouad Siniora proposes a peace-plan at the 15-nation conference in Rome on 27 July.
- A missile fired by Israel, has hit a house in Lebanon; seven civilians confirmed dead.
- Since 12 July, at least 405 people—mostly civilians—have been killed in Israeli strikes, Lebanese security sources said. The fighting also wounded about 1,660 people the source said. Lebanese Health Minister Mohammad Khalifeh claimed that up to 600 civilians may have been killed in the Israeli bombardment.
IDF
- The Security Cabinet approves the IDF's request to mobilize three reserve divisions (5,000 soldiers per division).
- IDF said it killed 50 militants in last 2 days. Israel suffers its worst day since the Lebanon conflict began as a dozen of its soldiers are killed in fighting with Hezbollah.
- The Israeli campaign is aimed at "changing the reality on the northern border", Israeli defense minister Amir Peretz said. "Hezbollah must not in the future be what it has been in the past", Peretz said. "This may take time and it may take more force. We have both in plenty." "We will not agree for Hezbollah flags again to fly in our faces on the northern border", he said. On the evening, at least five rockets struck various targets in the northern Israeli town of Qiryat Shemona, causing several fires. A Katyusha rocket caused a major blaze at the warehouse of a laundry detergent factory, the IDF said. Some of the rockets landed near a shopping center. The IDF said the Israeli death toll is 50–19 of them civilians. The fighting also wounded about 300 civilians in Israel, the source said.
- Israeli army radio reports that Israeli Army chief of staff Dan Halutz has ordered the air force to destroy 10 multi-story buildings in the Dahaya district (of Beirut) in response to every rocket fired on Haifa.
Hezbollah
- The Israeli military and Hezbollah fighters exchanged heavy fire around three border towns in southern Lebanon as rockets rained on northern Israel, much of which appears to be nearly deserted. Aerial footage of the region showed sparsely populated highways and minimal activity. In Haifa, Israel's third-largest city, abandoned warehouses, factories and garages dotted the landscape, and there were no cargo ships in the normally bustling port. Earlier in the day, Hezbollah fired dozens of rockets that fell in fields near Safed, Karmiel, Maalot and Shlomi in northern Israel, the IDF said.
United Nations
- The IDF has concentrated most of its attacks around the border communities of Maroun al-Ras, Bint Jbeil and Yarun, UNIFIL said. Diplomatic sources said at least four countries had offered to participate in a possible multinational peacekeeping force in Lebanon. France, Italy, Turkey and Norway indicated a willingness to participate if a cease-fire can first be brokered, according to diplomatic sources familiar with discussions at 26 July's emergency summit in Rome.
- The U.N. Security Council released a statement saying it was "deeply shocked and distressed" by the Israeli airstrikes that struck a U.N. bunker earlier this week, killing four peacekeepers. Troops from Finland, Canada, China and Austria died after the strike in Khiam, U.N. officials said. All four were members of the U.N. Interim Force in Lebanon, a French-led observer mission on the Israeli-Lebanese border. Security Council members met for hours, but were initially unable to come to a consensus on the statement's wording. Diplomatic sources said the main holdout was the U.S., which had problems with the statement's harshness toward Israel. After the 15 member countries agreed to the resolution, Chinese ambassador Wang Guangya called the statement "watered-down" and "the minimum the Security Council can do under the circumstances."
Israel
- 90 rockets were fired at northern Israel, killing an Israeli-Arab teenager and wounding about 20 others.
- Israel decided not to expand its military offensive in Lebanon, but will call up troops to bolster its fight against Hezbollah. Three additional reserve divisions, totaling 30,000 troops, would be called up, according to The New York Times.
- Israeli ambassador to the U.N. Dan Gillerman said, however, that the statement was "fair and balanced", and reiterated his claim that Israel has been "very cautious" in choosing its targets in Lebanon. "This is a war which is going on", he said. "War is an ugly thing, and during war, mistakes and tragedies do happen."
  - Israel said diplomats' decision not to call for a halt to its Lebanon offensive at a summit has given it the green light to continue.
- Israel says it will keep control over an area in southern Lebanon until an international force can be deployed.
Al-Qaeda
- Al-Qaeda's second in command pledged that the terror group would not "stay silent" on the conflict in southern Lebanon and called for "jihad" on Israel.

== 28 July ==
Hezbollah
- Hezbollah fires a new rocket, the Khaibar-1 at Afula. Three missiles carrying 100 kilograms (220 pounds) each of explosives—nearly five-times the explosives in the standard Hezbollah missile, the Katyusha rocket—were fired toward the town of Afula, the police said. Powerful maybe like a Fajr-5 rocket. Afula is 44 miles southeast of Haifa and is just a few miles north of the West Bank. The rockets hit empty fields, causing no casualties, police said. On the group's television network, Al-Manar, Hezbollah said it fired a new, longer-range rocket called a Khaybar-1. It was not clear what the rocket's full capabilities are. In all, at least five Hezbollah rockets landed near Afula, police said. It was unclear if the other two were Katyushas. During the conflict, Hezbollah has relied mostly on Russian-designed, highly mobile Katyusha rockets. They pack 22 kilograms (49 pounds) of explosives and have hit Afula in the past. The Israeli military did not know what the other rockets were and said only that they were not Iranian-made Zilzals, which have a longer range than Katyushas.
- The West Galilee Hospital at Nahariya was damaged by a rocket of Hezbollah. Hezbollah guerrillas launched their most potentially destructive rockets yet, reaching as far into Israel as they have at any point so far in the conflict, according to Israeli police.
- 15 Hezbollah militants are killed while fighting in Bint Jbeil.(YNET NEWS) Hezbollah has not officially released any casualty figures, but Israeli military sources estimated about 200 Hezbollah fighters have been killed since 12 July.
- The Mehr news agency in Iran said Ali Larijani, secretary of Iran's Supreme National Security Council, was in Damascus for meetings on the crisis, but gave no other details. Furthermore, Iran's state news agency confirmed Hezbollah Secretary General Hassan Nasrallah's presence in Damascus. Although Hezbollah has received significant Iranian assistance in the past, Iranian officials denied assisting Hezbollah in the current conflict.
- Hezbollah leader Hassan Nasrallah was reported to have taken refuge in the Iranian Embassy in Beirut.
Israel
- Israeli officials said that 51 Israelis—33 soldiers and 19 civilians—have died and 1,233 Israelis—110 soldiers and 1,123 civilians—have been wounded in the fighting began between Hezbollah forces and Israel. Despite the intense fighting, the Israeli government said it was not planning to send thousands of troops into Lebanon to fall into a possible militant trap. "Israel is going to do it at our own pace, at our own time, to make sure that when we go in, we go in carefully, and that we don't walk into their booby traps", Israeli government spokeswoman Miri Eisin said. "We want to stop the rocket fire, but we also want to make sure that Hezbollah will not be there afterward." Since Israel left Lebanon in 2000, Hezbollah has built up the area around Bint Jbeil in southern Lebanon, according to Eisin. "Not only [do they have] a terrorist army, but they are sort of waiting for us to come in", she said. "They have booby-trapped the entire area. They want us to walk into those booby traps."
- In Israel, there was disagreement between Mossad intelligence which says Hezbollah will be able to continue fighting at the current level for a long time and military intelligence which believes Hezbollah has been severely damaged. Other scholars have also questioned the Israeli reliance on air power.
United Nations
- Aid agencies say they are finding it impossible to get food and medicines safely into the region. U.N. Emergency Relief Coordinator Jan Egeland said he is pushing for a 72-hour cease-fire so humanitarian aid can be delivered safely to Israel, Lebanon and Gaza. The IDF said it is willing to allow safe passage for aid and evacuation convoys with 48 hours notice, Egeland said. Also in southern Lebanon, the United Nations removed unarmed observers from two outposts along the Israeli-Lebanese border as a protective measure, U.N. officials said. The move comes after Israeli airstrikes struck a separate U.N. observer outpost earlier in the week, killing four peacekeepers. The Israeli government expressed regret and said it is investigating.
United States
- President Bush and British prime minister Tony Blair called for an international force to be sent to Lebanon to help ease the Mideast crisis. After talks at the White House, Bush told reporters that the two leaders "agree that a multinational force must be dispatched to Lebanon quickly." U.S. secretary of state Condoleezza Rice will return to the region 29 July to resume her diplomatic efforts there. France, Italy and Turkey have said they will participate in the international force, and Norway and Sweden have said they are "positive" about the prospect, but have yet to commit. The United States also evacuated about 500 more Americans from Beirut on a cruise ship, the AP said. About 15,000 U.S. citizens have left the war-torn country, according to the AP.
- Six people are shot, one fatally, at the Seattle Jewish Center in a religiously-motivated killing spree. The killer identified himself as a Muslim American who was angry over about the 2006 Israel-Lebanon conflict.
  - The White House has dismissed UK concerns about the use of Prestwick Airport, in Scotland, by United States planes carrying bombs to Israel.
European Union
- The European Union said it had finished evacuating most of its 20,000 citizens from Lebanon, according to the Associated Press. However, a "few hundred" people remained trapped in southern Lebanon, the EU told the AP.
- The EU President and US State Department react to Israeli Justice Minister Haim Ramon's claim that the deadlocked Rome conference was a sign that the world supported Israeli attacks in Lebanon. The EU described the claim as "totally wrong" and the US declared the statement "outrageous". (BBC News) (EUobserver).
IDF
- So far, only the officers of the three divisions of reserves, authorized 27 August, have put on their uniforms and begun to train for possible military action, military sources said. In the airstrikes on southern Lebanon, Israeli warplanes hit rocket launchers, structures, tunnels, a gas station and a base in the Bekaa Valley where the Israel Defense Forces said Hezbollah launched long-range missiles. Israeli airstrikes near Nabatiye killed three people and wounded nine, including four children, AP reported, citing Lebanese security officials. The raid apparently targeted an apartment belonging to a Hezbollah activist, according to the AP. Near Naqoura, also in southern Lebanon, two civilians and a journalist were slightly wounded when their convoy was struck, according to a BBC cameraman who was traveling with the convoy. It was unclear whether Israeli or Hezbollah fire hit the convoy, which had been organized to help civilians escape the fighting.
- The IDF reported that 26 gunmen were killed in clashes near the southern Lebanon town of Maroun Al Ras, Bint Jbeil and Eitaroun. Shelling was also conducted on Tyre in addition to areas in Al Biqa plains, 14 Lebanese fatalities were reported.
- Lebanese officials reported that Israel conducted over 130 air raids (killing 13) while an Israeli police spokesman said that Hezbollah fired 97 rockets into Northern Israel (wounding 3).

== 29 July ==
IDF
- IDF withdraws from the town of Bint Jbeil. And were searching for pockets of resistance. Thus it was the end of the Battle of Bint Jbeil. 8 Israeli soldiers and 50–70 Hezbollah militants were killed in Bint Jbeil.
- Israel Defense Forces killed two Islamic Jihad militants in the West Bank, one of whom was the head of the group's military wing, according to Palestinian sources. The IDF did not confirm the report, but said that a gunman was killed in a gunfight near Nablus. The deaths come the day after the IDF reported that it had arrested 22 "wanted Palestinians" in the West Bank on 27 July. Two Israeli airstrikes prompted the main border crossing between Lebanon and Syria to close, Lebanese army sources said. Israeli strikes have already left roads leading to the crossing badly damaged.
- There were IDF missile attacks around the area of Al Safeer, in the Al Dahia Al Janoubiyya area of Beirut, and shelling of the Jarhou' area in southern Lebanon. North of Beirut IDF shelling destroyed the Al Assy Bridge. Shelling attacks were also made against Jabal Abu Rashid, Borka, Jbour and Al Nahry in Al Biqa plains. Sahl Al Khiyam, in Marj Oyoun area, in southern Lebanon were also shelled with artillery as well as Al Tayba and Markaba villages. The area around Sour city and outlying villages was also shelled. An IDF spokeswoman said that the IDF had attacked 51 targets overnight and at dawn, destroying 37 buildings used by Hezbollah. The Israeli Air Force carried out 60 airstrikes overnight on Hezbollah locations and structures as assaults between the Lebanese militant group and the Israeli military entered their 18th day, the Israel Defense Forces said. Targets struck by the IDF were located chiefly in southern Lebanon and included 37 Hezbollah warehouses and locations, roads, bridges and cars, the IDF said.
United Nations
- Diplomatic efforts to halt the violence in Lebanon continued in Jerusalem. U.S. secretary of state Condoleezza Rice dined with Israeli prime minister Ehud Olmert at night, according to the U.S. Embassy in Tel Aviv. Hours earlier, Israel rejected a U.N. call for a three-day cease-fire. It has not been announced if Rice would travel to Beirut to meet with Lebanese Prime Minister Fouad Siniora, and Rice has said she doesn't plan on taking a comprehensive proposal to the region. "I don't expect to present somebody with a 'here are the five points you must accept,' " she said. "This has got to be some give and take. This is difficult." U.S. officials and diplomatic sources involved in the negotiations said Rice's goal is to merge various proposals for ending the fighting into a comprehensive package agreed to by Israel and Lebanon and enshrined in a United Nations resolution. The U.S.-endorsed plan would require Lebanon to deploy its army with the help of an international peacekeeping force and agree to call for Hezbollah to disarm, with its military wing ultimately integrating into the Lebanese army. This would all need to happen before an official cease-fire could be declared. In return, Israel would resolve the issue of the disputed Shebaa Farms territory with Lebanon.
- The U.N. Security Council will begin debating a resolution this week spelling out the way ahead. Later in the week, 3 August, Rice will attend a ministerial meeting of council members to finalize language on the text. Rice said she has only read news reports about the Lebanese government proposal—to which Hezbollah had agreed in principle with some reservations—but it appeared to have "some very good elements." She called it a "positive step." France circulated a draft U.N. Security Council resolution calling for an immediate cessation of hostilities in the Mideast and laying the foundation for the deployment of a multi-national force aimed at supporting the Lebanese army in disarming Hezbollah, according to diplomatic sources.
- The United Nations' appeal for the cease-fire came from its emergency relief coordinator Jan Egeland "so that we can evacuate wounded, evacuate children, evacuate the elderly and the disabled from the crossfire in Lebanon." A third of the people killed in Lebanon have been children, he said.
- Two U.N. peacekeepers from the Indian battalion were wounded at afternoon when an aerial bomb detonated near them in south Lebanon, said a spokesman for the U.N. Interim Force in Lebanon. Their observation tower was damaged, UNIFIL added. UNIFIL had earlier reported Israeli and Hezbollah fire near its positions on both sides of the border and said it "strongly protested all these incidents to the Israeli and Lebanese authorities." An Israeli attack on another U.N. observation post killed four U.N. observers 25 July.
Hezbollah
- Hezbollah has said it will not disarm until Israeli troops leave the disputed region near the Syrian border, which the U.N. recognizes as Syrian territory. Hezbollah leader Hassan Nasrallah said, in a speech aired on his group's Al-Manar TV station, that Israel had been counting on a victory to secure a political solution but has failed. "It's clear ... that the Zionist enemy has not been able to reach a military victory. I'm not saying that. They said that. The whole world is saying that", he said. Nasrallah also said Rice's return to the region was to impose the will of the United States on the Middle East. "Rice comes back to the region to try to impose its conditions again on Lebanon – serving in its new Middle East and serving Israel", he said.
- Hezbollah head Hassan Nasrallah vows rocket strikes on towns in central Israel, calling it a "temporary country" and asking "When in any Arab-Israeli conflict were two million Israelis forced to flee or enter bomb shelters?" (Haaretz), (Ynet)
- As of 3:30 p.m. (8:30 am. ET), 39 rockets had landed in northern Israel, six inside the cities of Acre, Tiberias, Nahariya and Safed, wounding five people.
Lebanon
- Since 12 July, Lebanese Internal Security Forces said that 421 people have been killed and 1,661 have been wounded in Lebanon. A Turkish warship with dialysis equipment arrived at the Port of Beirut, as did a U.S. warship with blankets, tarpaulins and medical equipment.
Israel
- In Israel, 52 people have been killed, more than half of them soldiers, and more than 1,200 have been wounded, according to Israeli officials.
- Israeli government spokesman Avi Pazner said Israel rejects a temporary cease-fire for getting civilians out of southern Lebanon. "There is no need for a 72-hour temporary cease-fire because Israel has opened a humanitarian corridor to and from Lebanon", Pazner told reporters.
United States
- The U.S. plan is similar to one proposed this week by Siniora and endorsed 28 July by his Cabinet, including the Hezbollah ministers. Siniora's proposal includes strengthening the existing United Nations Interim Force in Lebanon in south Lebanon and deploying the Lebanese army to the area. Both plans call for Israel to agree on a prisoner exchange for the release of the Israelis soldiers kidnapped by Hezbollah and to resolve the issue of the disputed Shebaa Farms territory. But two major sticking points remain. Lebanon, as well as Arab and European states say a cease-fire must take place before the rest of the deal can be implemented, while the U.S. and Israel insist the force must be in place, the Lebanese army must be deployed and efforts must be under way to disarm Hezbollah before an official cease-fire can be declared. The composition and mandate of the international force is also a thorny issue. The U.S. and Israel would prefer a European force, while Lebanon wants to expand the existing UNIFIL force. And it remains unclear whether the force would have the authority to fight against Hezbollah.

== 30 July ==
Israel

- Israeli prime minister Ehud Olmert's office told Rice that Israel needed 10 to 14 more days to complete its mission against Hezbollah militia.

IDF

- IAF airstrike of a three-story building in Qana, Southern Lebanon, kills 28 people, including 16 children, hiding in its bombshelter. 13 people were reported missing. As a result, Israel announces its intention to severely restrict further airstrikes for a 48-hour period beginning 2 am 31 July 2006. Previously, it was estimated that 56 people died, 34 of them children.
- Also, the Israeli military confirmed that its troops had moved into areas of southeast Lebanon – Kfar Kela and Odayse—as part of an operation to control the area between the Israeli border town of Metula, in Israel's northeast, and Tyre. Also, Israeli Defense Forces said its ground troops were operating in the border village of Taiba in southeastern Lebanon, an area Israel said Hezbollah uses to launch rockets. Troops have killed at least three Hezbollah militants and found stockpiles of rocket-propelled grenades, anti-tank missiles, a cannon with shells and a machine gun, the IDF said. Four Israeli soldiers were injured when an anti-tank rocket hit their tank in southern Lebanon, an Israeli military spokesman said. Under cover of artillery strikes IDF ground troops pushed towards the village of Adisa. The IDF said the village was being used as a launching site for rocket attacks. One IDF soldier was shot and wounded near Adisa and IDF jets bombed unreported targets in Khiyam. Fire from Regular Lebanese Army in Yammouni was reported against IDF Choppers attempting to land in the area. The Lebanese dispersed following airstrikes by IDF.
- Israel halts air strikes for forty-eight hours, after an airstrike killed sixty civilians in Qana, Lebanon. (CTV NEWS)
Hezbollah
- A record 156 rockets hit Israel. In Israel, police officials said 134 Hezbollah rockets slammed into the Jewish state. Officials reported 48 injuries, one of them serious. Twenty-four rockets landed in Akko, Nahariya, Qiryat Shemona, Metula and in the upper part of the Galilee, police said.
United States
- Senior U.S. State Department officials said Condoleezza Rice will leave Jerusalem for Washington 31 July to negotiate a draft resolution to present to the Security Council this week aimed at bringing a halt to the crisis. George W. Bush said the United States is resolved to work with members of the Security Council to draw up "a resolution that will enable the region to have a sustainable peace", he said.
UN
- The UN Security Council is to hold an emergency meeting on the Lebanon crisis after the deaths of more than 54 Lebanese civilians in an Israeli raid.

== 31 July ==
IDF
- Israel Air Force continues airstrikes in support of ground forces in southern Lebanon, but refrains from attacks elsewhere in accordance with its stated 48-hour period of restraint.
- The Israeli military and Hezbollah forces started engagement in the town of Ayta al-Sha'b in southern Lebanon.
- Reuters, quoting Israel Radio, reported 15,000 reservists would be called up, but it is not clear whether those troops are the ones already authorized or extra troops. Clashes with Hezbollah have left 33 Israeli troops dead, IDF said. Hezbollah's casualties were not known.
- The Israeli army said strikes near the Lebanese village of Tayba were meant to protect ground forces operating in the border area and were not aimed at specific targets. The Israeli military expressed regret that one of the strikes hit a Lebanese military vehicle outside Tyre, Lebanon. The Israel Defense Forces said it was unclear how many people were killed. Earlier, a senior Lebanese Interior Ministry official said the airstrike killed an aide to a Lebanese general and wounded three soldiers. The general survived the attack, the official said. The IDF said it thought the car was carrying a senior Hezbollah militant involved in directing rocket fire on Israel. Earlier, the IDF said its aircraft fired on open fields surrounding its ground forces in the Tayba area. Three Israeli soldiers in the area suffered minor injuries after Hezbollah fighters hit their tank with a missile, an Israeli army spokesman said. The towns of Al-Awayda area, Kafr Shuba' and Kafr Hamam were also hit with IDF artillery strikes.
Hezbollah
- Hezbollah also holds its fire, with "the Israeli Army counting only three mortar shells landing in Israel ... and no rockets." at least three in Haifa, wounding six people.
- Hezbollah's Al-Manar television station claimed Hezbollah missiles hit an Israeli warship. An Israeli security source said no Israeli vessel had been hit, according to Reuters news service. Reuters also reported that Hezbollah said the attack was retaliation for 30 August bombing of Qana, Lebanon, that killed at least 54 civilians. The airstrike—which killed many children and sparked international outrage—threatened to derail work toward a resolution in the conflict between Israel and Hezbollah guerrillas.
- Two Hezbollah rockets hit in an open area of the northern Israeli town of Kiryat Shmona, but no casualties were reported, Israeli police officials said. The firings marked the first Hezbollah rocket attacks into northern Israel from southern Lebanon in a day. Hezbollah has responded by firing scores of rockets a day into northern Israel, killing at least 18 Israeli civilians, according to IDF.
United Nations
- At the United Nations, a Security Council meeting on planning for a new peacekeeping force had been delayed "until there is more political clarity" on the path ahead in the Middle East conflict, Reuters news agency reported. U.N. Secretary-General Kofi Annan had called the meeting 28 July, but the world's major powers have said no force can be put in place until fighting stops and Israel, Lebanon and Hezbollah agree to its deployment, Reuters reported.
- Teams from the Red Cross and United Nations arrived in the southern Lebanese town of Bint Jbeil to survey the damage and evacuate residents, a day after heavy fighting reduced much of the area to rubble.
- The UN Security Council has expressed its "shock and distress" at the previous day's Israeli attack in which 54 Lebanese civilians, many of them children, were killed.
United States
- President Bush said there could be no cease-fire until Hezbollah was reined in and international borders respected, reiterating the U.S. stance on the conflict. Bush, speaking in Florida, said Israel had the right to defend itself and called on Iran and Syria to stop aiding Hezbollah. "Iran must end its financial support and supply of weapons to terrorist groups like Hezbollah", Bush said. "Syria must end its support for terror and respect the sovereignty of Lebanon." U.S. secretary of state Condoleezza Rice, speaking earlier, said she believed a resolution to the crisis could be reached this week.
Israel
- Israel has called the Qana airstrike a tragic mistake, and Ehud Olmert apologized for the pain the Lebanese people have endured. But he added, "We are fighting terrorists who know no bounds." In his speech today, he said Hezbollah has suffered a "heavy blow" in the fighting. Israeli troops and airstrikes have inflicted serious damage to Hezbollah's capacity to launch rockets into Israel, and its supply routes from Syria have been hampered, he said. "We will stop the war when the [rocket] threat is removed ..., our captive soldiers return home in peace, and you are able to live in safety and security." "We are paying a very precious and almost unbearable price in terms of loss of life, major damage to public and private property and tranquility – and we're not prepared to give up our right to live perfectly ordinary lives, which are not subject to terrorism and hate and fanaticism", Olmert said.
- Dan Gillerman, the Israeli ambassador to the United Nations, said he was "not really worried" by today's Syrian declaration.
- Israeli defence minister Amir Peretz has said that, despite a 48-hour halt to air strikes on south Lebanon, Israel cannot agree to an immediate ceasefire.
- In New York, Olmert's deputy, Shimon Peres, said Israel's problem is with Hezbollah's Syrian and Iranian backers, not Lebanon. "Though Hezbollah is a Lebanese body, they don't serve any Lebanese purpose", he said. Their purpose, he said, is to "make Lebanon part of the sphere of influence of Iran."
Syria
- Syrian president Bashar al-Assad directed his country's military to heighten its readiness, vowing to back Lebanese resistance against Israel, the state news agency SANA reported.
Lebanon
- Israeli airstrikes and artillery have pounded Lebanon since then, leaving nearly 500 people dead, Lebanese Internal Security Forces said.
