= Abdul Hamid Adiamoh =

Nigerian journalist

Abdul Hamid Adiamoh is a Nigerian journalist and publisher of Today Newspaper in the Gambia.

== Career ==
Adiamoh was born in Ibadan to a teacher and architect. The second of six children, he attended Ibadan Grammar School, Ibadan and Ladoke Akintola University, Ogbomosho, Nigeria. He left Nigeria during the Abacha administration and settle in the Gambia, where he established himself as a business journalist with the Daily Observer Newspaper. He left the Observer to start his own company, first called MediaMethods and then INK. He started the Business Gambia, a monthly business magazine, in association with the Gambia Chamber of Commerce and Industry. Today Newspaper first published in July 2007.

== Challenges ==
In September 2007, Adiamoh was arrested for publishing an article on children skipping school, picking scrap metal, and selling it to scrap dealers. According to the charge sheet brought against him, he was accused of seditious intention. Media reports of the event cite the attempt by state forces to stifle the media. His arrest and bail of 200,000 Gambian dalasi (US$ 9500) coincided with the conviction and sentencing of Fatou Jaw Manneh, another journalist who was found guilty of a 2005 article.

Adiamoh was also arrested in June 2009 for false publication. TODAY had on June 10 reported the sack of two Gambian ministers - Attorney General Marie Saine Firdaus and minister for Local Government, Ismaila Sambou as part of a landslide cabinet reshuffle. Finding the report to be untrue, TODAY of June 11, 2009 retracted the story, and published a public apology. The paper also mentioned its efforts to stop the circulation of the edition. Despite these efforts, Adiamoh was arrested, detained for five days, before he was charged for false publication and broadcasting, a criminal offence under Gambian laws that could carry a maximum sentence of D250,000 fine or a six-month imprisonment term.

Adiamoh lives in the Gambia with his family.
