= Taiwo Ogunjobi =

Nigerian footballer and administrator (1953–2019)

Personal information
- Full name: CHIEF Taiwo Joseph Ogunjobi
- Date of birth: 17 August 1953
- Place of birth: Ilesa, Nigeria
- Date of death: 11 February 2019 (aged 65)
- Place of death: Ibadan, Nigeria
- Position: Centre-back

Senior career*
Years	Team	Apps	(Gls)
1973–1975	Shooting Stars		
1980–1986	Shooting Stars		

International career
- Nigeria
- * Club domestic league appearances and goals

Taiwo Joseph Ogunjobi (17 August 1953 – 11 February 2019) was a Nigerian football player and administrator. He played as a centre-back for Shooting Stars and represented Nigeria internationally. He later held posts as an administrator at club and state levels, and with the Nigeria Football Federation (NFF) and its predecessor the Nigeria Football Association, serving as secretary-general between 2002 and 2005.

== Playing career ==
Ogunjobi played for the Nigerian academicals team; he was made captain during 1973–74 and led the side that beat the Ghanaian academicals that season. He joined Shooting Stars, then known as WNDC Ibadan, in 1973.

He left Shooting Stars in 1975 to study in the United States, but returned in 1980 and was appointed captain. A centre-back, he regularly partnered Ogbein Fawole. He led the club to the final of the 1984 African Cup of Champions Clubs. He retired in 1986.

He also represented the Nigerian national team, making his debut against Morocco in a qualification match for the 1984 Olympics.

== Administration career ==
Following his retirement, Ogunjobi became deputy director at the Ministry of Information in Oyo State. While there, he was seconded to Shooting Stars. He became the club's secretary and was later promoted to general manager. During that time, he oversaw their victory in the 1992 CAF Cup. In 1994, he was named as the club's sole administrator, overseeing their victories in the National League and Federation Cup in 1995. He was appointed president of Gabros International in 1999, and later moved to Julius Berger, where he served as general manager for two years.

Ogunjobi served as secretary-general of the Nigeria Football Association between 2002 and 2005. He went on to hold the post of chairman of the NFF Technical Committee, and served on the executive committee between 2006 and 2010. He also worked as a member of NFF delegations at FIFA competitions between 2002 and 2010, and officiated as match commissioner for two qualification matches for the 2010 FIFA World Cup. In 2012, he was one of four NFF officials that were arrested amid accusations that money had gone missing after the 2010 World Cup, and in 2013, he was issued with a ban from football-related activities for 10 years after allegedly preventing the transfer of Olarenwaju Kayode. He was cleared after both incidents. He served as chairman of Prime United and oversaw their transition into Osun United, before resigning in 2017. After a previous attempt in 2014, in September 2018 he lost a second challenge to become NFF President. He served as chairman of the Osun State Football Association at the time of his death in February 2019.

== Personal life ==
Ogunjobi was born in Ilesa in 1953, into a Yoruba family. His older brother, also called Taiwo, was a national champion in the 400 metres hurdles and died in the 1992 Nigerian Air Force C-130 crash. Ogunjobi attended African Church Grammar School and then Ibadan Grammar School, whose games master at that point was Lam Adesina. He took fours years out of his football career to study in the United States, taking Textile Engineering at Clemson University in South Carolina, via an athletics scholarship. He met his wife – who went on to work for the National Sports Commission – while playing for Shooting Stars, proposing on "the first day we met". They had five children. He died in 2019, aged 65, at the University College Hospital, Ibadan following a short illness.
