= Isaac Babalola Akinyele =

Ruler of Ibadan, Nigeria (1882–1964)

Oba Sir Isaac Babalola Akinyele, KBE (18 April 1882 – 30 May 1964) was the first educated Olubadan (non-hereditary traditional ruler) of Ibadan, and the second Christian to ascend the throne.

== Family ==
Bolude, an Ibadan warrior during the many war campaigns of the Ibadan and herbalist who practiced the traditional Yoruba religion of repute in the years of Ibadan militocracy, had Josiah Akinyele as his first son. Josiah was one of the early converts under the auspices of David Hinderer, the German leader of the Church Mission Society (CMS) and his team of six missionaries that first brought Christianity to Ibadan in 1851. Josiah Akinyele took Abigail Lapeno, the daughter of Kukomi, another powerful Ibadan pagan warrior, who also was converted to Christianity through Hinderer; as his second wife in 1870.

In 1875, she gave birth to her first son; Alexander Babatunde Akinyele, the first Anglican Diocesan Bishop of Ibadan. Several years later on 18 April 1882, she gave birth to the second son, Isaac Babalola Akinyele.

== Civil service ==
He followed in his brother's footsteps and excelled academically. With the example of the Akinyele brothers, Ibadan people started to take the issue of the education seriously to the extent that in 1910, a proclamation was made by the ruler; that made it compulsory for every household to send at least one child to school or pay a fine of five pounds. Since the Pax Britannica of 1893, the Ibadan had started to settle down to civil life occasioning cocoa farming; introduced by the CMS around 1890, and other agricultural and business enterprises. Isaac Akinyele worked for a time as a civil servant, entering government services in the junior ranks to which Nigerians were confined in those days, becoming a customs inspector for the Ibadan District Council in 1903. He rose through the ranks, later becoming chief judge of the native court. He was also a very successful entrepreneur; establishing cocoa plantations throughout Ibadan and its environs.

== Work, worship, and witness ==
He was politically sensitive, gaining fame in the chieftaincy and political milieu of Ibadan. In 1911, he wrote and published an authoritative book on the history of Ibadan titled "Iwe Itan Ibadan". In 1914, he and his brother joined the Egbe Agba O'Tan, a frontline nineteenth century association of members of the educated Yorùbá elite committed to fighting the cause of their tribe, clearly a precursor of the Egbé Ọmọ Odùduwà in the Yoruba social environment, and of the Ibadan Progressive Union in the Ibadan context. His brother Alexander Akinyele, was the first patron of IPU, and it was his peace-loving nature that influenced the Union in devising an easy, peaceful, and non-divisive Olubadan (non-hereditary traditional ruler) succession plan regarded as the most non-contentious in Yorubaland. Prior to 1924, Isaac Akinyele was a devout Anglican layman. He was a very religious man and was a great adherent of contextualisation and acculturisation of religious beliefs, because he held the view that religion without respect to cultural roots; would perpetually be seen as alien religion by the pagan citizenry. It was an extension of these strong views that made him break away from the main orthodox brand to join the Faith Tabernacle; the precursor of the Christ Apostolic Church, the first Aladura Pentecostal Church in Nigeria. He became the first President of that Church. This started the emergence of Pentecostalism; which has gained tremendous grounds in contemporary Nigeria.

By 1933, Isaac Akinyele had become a councillor of the Ibadan Native Authority. He became an Ibadan Oloye in 1935, a position which he always approached in a Christian way. For example, when he was appointed Balogun, one of the city's highest positions which corresponds roughly with the European Duke and which entails the holding of a ceremonial staff of office which is to be anointed weekly with sheep's blood. Failure to do so was believed to bring death upon the disdainer of the tradition. Isaac Akinyele had a Christian staff made, with a cross affixed on top, dedicated by church members with prayer and fasting. In 1948, he was honoured by the King of the United Kingdom and his Government in Nigeria, becoming an Officer of the Order of the British Empire. On 17 February 1955, he became the Olubadan (non-hereditary traditional ruler) of Ibadan. Although some objected, because of his total rejection of the Isese religion, he was chosen by an overwhelming majority. He was subsequently knighted as a KBE from Elizabeth II of the United Kingdom in 1956 during her state visit to Nigeria.

== Ebullition ==
In 1962, Akinyele's rule was soon engulfed in the turbulent political development in Western Region, Nigeria, the result of which was a growing rift in the Action Group between its leader, chief Obafemi Awolowo, and his deputy and premier of the Western Region, chief Samuel Ladoke Akintola. This came to an end when Alhaji Adegbenro, Chief Awolowo's supporter was appointed Premier by Governor Sir Titus Aderemi, the Oòni of Ilé-Ifẹ. Mayhem broke out in the House of Assembly as the new Premier was presenting his government for a vote of confidence. Following the subsequent outbreak of violence both among the parliamentarians in the assembly and among their supporters outside, the region was placed under a state of emergency. The government was suspended and Dr. Moses A. Majekodunmi was appointed sole administrator of the Western region. Throughout the entire political crisis, Isaac Akinyele who along with some members of the House of Chiefs was a minister without portfolio in the government remained aloof, placing himself at the disposal of any peace initiative for which Ibadan was a venue on several occasions. He ruled for only ten years but left an enduring legacy. He died in May 1965.

== Sources ==
- Theophilus Adeleke Akinyele: "Ibadan – the town, the gown and the dawn" derived from "Readings in Political Economy and Governance in Nigeria" Published by CSS Ltd. 2002
- Falola, Toyin (2000). Yoruba Gurus. Africa World Press. ISBN 0-86543-699-1.
- Nigeria Year Book, 1974, 1975, 1976–1978, 1979, 1980 (Lagos: Nigerian Printing & Publishing Co.).
