= Alexander Akinyele =

Anglican bishop of Nigeria

Alexander Babatunde Akinyele, CBE (5 September 1875 – 1 October 1968) was the first Anglican Diocesan Bishop of Ibadan, Nigeria. He was the first indigene of Ibadan to obtain a university degree, and the founder of the first secondary school, Ibadan Grammar School in Ibadan.

== Early beginnings ==
Bolude, a pagan Ibadan warrior and herbalist of repute in the years of Ibadan militocracy, had Josiah Akinyele as his first son. Josiah was one of the early converts under the auspices of David Hinderer, the German leader of the Church Missionary Society (CMS) and his team of six missionaries that first brought Christianity to Ibadan in 1851. Josiah Akinyele took Abigail Lapeno, the daughter of Kukomi, another powerful Ibadan pagan warrior, who also was converted to Christianity through Hinderer; as his second wife in 1870. She gave birth to her first son; Alexander Babatunde Akinyele. He had four siblings, but only one of them compared to him favourably in eminence and prominence; Isaac Babalola Akinyele. Between the brothers, they bestrode the environment of Ibadan in the fields of education, religion, social responsibility and politics, each like a colossus as from the last quarter of the nineteenth century.

== Education ==
Since Alexander Akinyele was born during the height of Ibadan military exploits, to be sent to school in those days in Ibadan was merely to please the European missionaries and it was often a perilous endeavour. It was a period when slavery, though officially outlawed by the British, was still in vogue in Ibadan, therefore the fear of child kidnapping and ritual murders pervaded the social atmosphere. Given the stated scenario, the few school boys of the time were led to school by warriors. In Alexander's case, the leader of his security escort was a warrior called Babamboni; who always carried the future bishop on his shoulders, for safety to school. He attended St. Peter's school Ibadan around 1880, and later completed his primary school education at Abobade school, Aroloya Lagos. He graduated first in his class, and was admitted the following year to the famous CMS Grammar School in Lagos, founded by the Church Missionary Society. The Bishop would recall in later life how he was jeered, taunted and ridiculed by his schoolmates in Lagos as "that boy with tribal marks". He then left to attend St. Andrews College, Oyo for teacher training. Subsequently, he became a teacher, and combined teaching with the duties of a catechist, organist and choirmaster. Bishop Tugwell in his Episcopal visit to Abeokuta in 1903, was so impressed with Alexander Akinyele's expertise as the organist at a church in Ake, particularly his flawless rendition of the visiting European Bishop's favourite hymn; that he ordered Alexander to sit for the entrance examination to Fourah Bay College, Sierra Leone. He entered the college on 25 January 1904. In 1906 he was awarded Licentiate in Theology (LTh), and later he obtained his Bachelor of Arts (Dunelm) in 1912, thus becoming the first Ibadan indigene to obtain a university degree.

== Pastoral work ==
On 6 June 1909, he was ordained a Deacon, and posted to Ibadan as an assistant priest. He married Miss Marian Davies on 12 January 1911, and together had four children. He put pressure on the Church Missionary Society to establish a grammar school in Ibadan, consequently on 31 March 1913, Ibadan Grammar School was established; with Alexander Akinyele, as its first principal. During his administration of the school, a tenure that spanned twenty years (1913–1933), he employed a non-discriminatory admission policy, and catered for all sections of Nigeria south of the Niger and Benue rivers. Alexander Akinyele became a Canon on 17 May 1931, and was consecrated as Assistant Bishop on 25 July 1933 at a solemn ceremony at Lambeth Palace Chapel, London. On 24 March 1952 at St. James Cathedral Church Ibadan, at the age of 77; he was enthroned as the first Bishop of the new Diocese of Ibadan. It was a crowning glory to a life of dedicated service to God. Because of his inestimable contribution to the progress and development of Ibadan, he was honoured with the chieftaincy title of the Aare of Ibadanland.

His younger brother, HRH Oba Isaac Babalola Akinyele, later ascended the throne of Ibadan, becoming the first educated Olubadan of Ibadan. They both passionately loved Ibadan. In 1949, Alexander Akinyele was appointed as a Commander of the Most Excellent Order of the British Empire. The Bishop who lived a life of purity and uprightness enjoined all Christians – as in his famous sermon delivered on 12 February 1956, when Queen Elizabeth II on state visit to Nigeria; worshiped at St. James Cathedral, Oke Bola, Ibadan – to use their eyes, heads, hands, voices and hearts for uplifting Jesus Christ. Alexander Babalola Akinyele was later called to join the Church triumphant in 1968, aged 92.

== Bibliography ==
- Theophilus Adeleke Akinyele: "Ibadan – the town, the gown and the dawn" derived from Readings in Political Economy and Governance in Nigeria. Published by CSS Ltd. 2002
- Theophilus Adeleke Akinyele: "The Life and Times of Bishop A.B. Akinyele" a speech delivered on 25 July 2002, at Ibadan Grammar School.
- Falola, Toyin (2000). Yoruba Gurus. Africa World Press. ISBN 0-86543-699-1.
