= Today Newspaper (The Gambia) =

- Type: Daily newspaper
- Format: Compact (Monday–Friday)
- Owner(s): Abdul Hamid Adiamoh
- Editor: Gbola Adiamoh
- Founded: 7 July 2007
- Political alignment: Independent
- Headquarters: Kanifing, the Gambia
- Price: The GambiaGMD10
- ISSN: 0796-157X
- Website: www. today.gm

Today Newspaper is an independent newspaper in the Gambia, West Africa. It was established July 2007 by Abdul Hamid Adiamoh, a Nigerian journalist.

The newspaper was the first to publish colour on its front cover and in selected pages.
