= Ibadan Grammar School =

Secondary school in Ibadan, Oyo State, Nigeria

Coordinates: 7.350°N 3.894°E

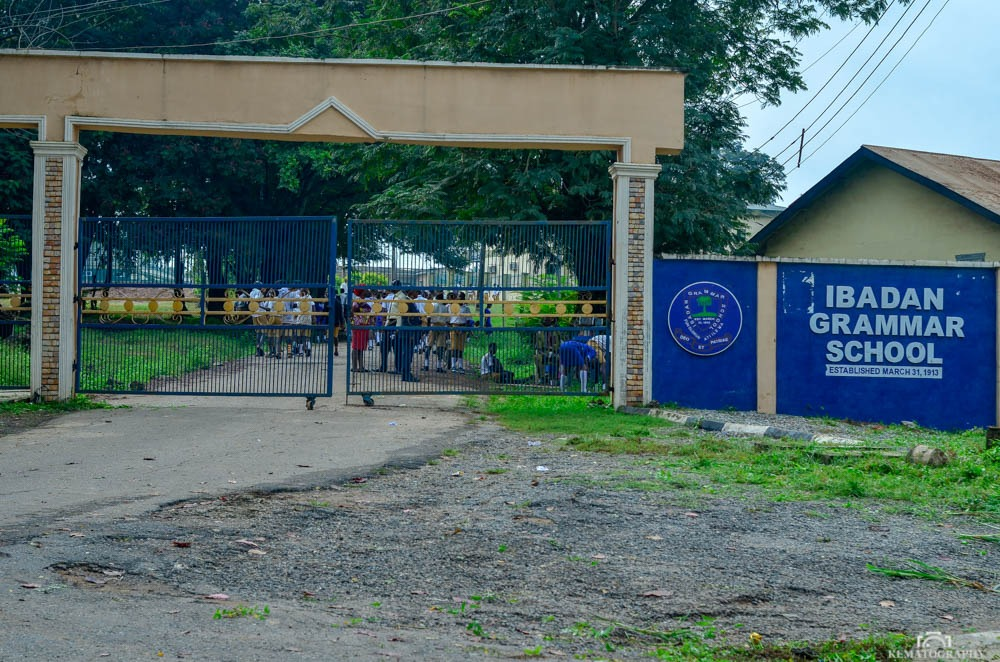
- Molete Area; Ibadan, Nigeria

Information
- Established: 31 March 1913; 113 years ago
- Principal: Alexander Babatunde Akinyele
- Slogan: Deo et patria
- Website: www.ibadangrammarschool.org

Ibadan Grammar School is a secondary school in the city of Ibadan, Nigeria. It is currently located at Molete area, close to St. David grammar school.

== History ==
Ibadan Grammar School is a co-ed Anglican high school open to students of all backgrounds and faiths. The school was founded on 31 March 1913 on a historical day in Ibadan by Bishop Alexander Babatunde Akinyele. It was the first secondary school in Ibadan. During the school's formative years, it was attended by wards and children of the city's educated elite classes who sent their children there for schooling. In the first 31 years of its establishment, the school accepted male students only. It officially became co-ed in 1941. In the 1950s and 1960s, the Higher School Certificate was awarded to students who were able to complete the sixth form. The first principal of the school was Alexander Babatunde Akinyele. while the current Principal is Mr. Joseph.

== Subject offerings ==
List of the subject offerings at Ibadan Grammar School:

- English Studies
- Mathematics
- Civic Education
- Animal Husbandry
- Technical Drawing
- Financial Accounting
- Auto Mechanics
- Christian Religion studies
- Physics
- French Language
- Chemistry
- Geography
- Biology
- Agricultural Science
- Economics
- Computer and IT
- Nigeria Language (Yoruba)
- Music
- Government
- Literature in English
- History

== Founder Day Celebration ==
On March 19, 2019, the old boy association of the school came together to celebrate the ancient school which clock 106 years. In order to mark this, the prominent former students of the school organized many programmes to mark the founders day of the ancient school in style and good way in giving back to their Alma mater. Among there prominent notable people are The roster of distinguished alumni from Ibadan Grammar School includes the deceased Pa Emmanuel Alayande, who later served as a school Principal. The late Chief Ajibola Ige, former Nigeria's Attorney-General and Minister of Justice, also served as a governor of Oyo State. Dr. Olusegun Agagu, the former Governor of Ondo State, and the late football icon Chief Taiwo Ogunjobi are also notable. Additionally, the late High Chief Bayo Akinnola, Lisa of Ondo Kingdom Chief Alex Ibru, the late founder of Guardian Newspaper and Chief Ayotunde Rosiji, a late statesman and politician, are part of this esteemed list.

== ICT Training ==
Ibadan grammar school in collaboration with the Oyo state government and google have organized ICT Training for 30,000 students across Oyo state.

== Bursary award ==
On 7 July 2023, the alumni of Ibadan Grammar School association have award and give students bursary, the bursary was given to the student who recently gotten admitted to higher institution of their choice.

== Notable alumni ==
- Mike Adenuga
- FOM Atake
- Ayo Rosiji
- Michael Omolewa
- Abdul Hamid Adiamoh
- Alex Ibru
- Olusegun Agagu
- Bola Ige
- Adedotun Aremu Gbadebo III
- Justice Ayotunde Phillips
- Ken Nnamani
- Alfred Diete-Spiff
