= Mariam Yalwaji Katagum =

Nigerian politician and diplomat (born 1954)

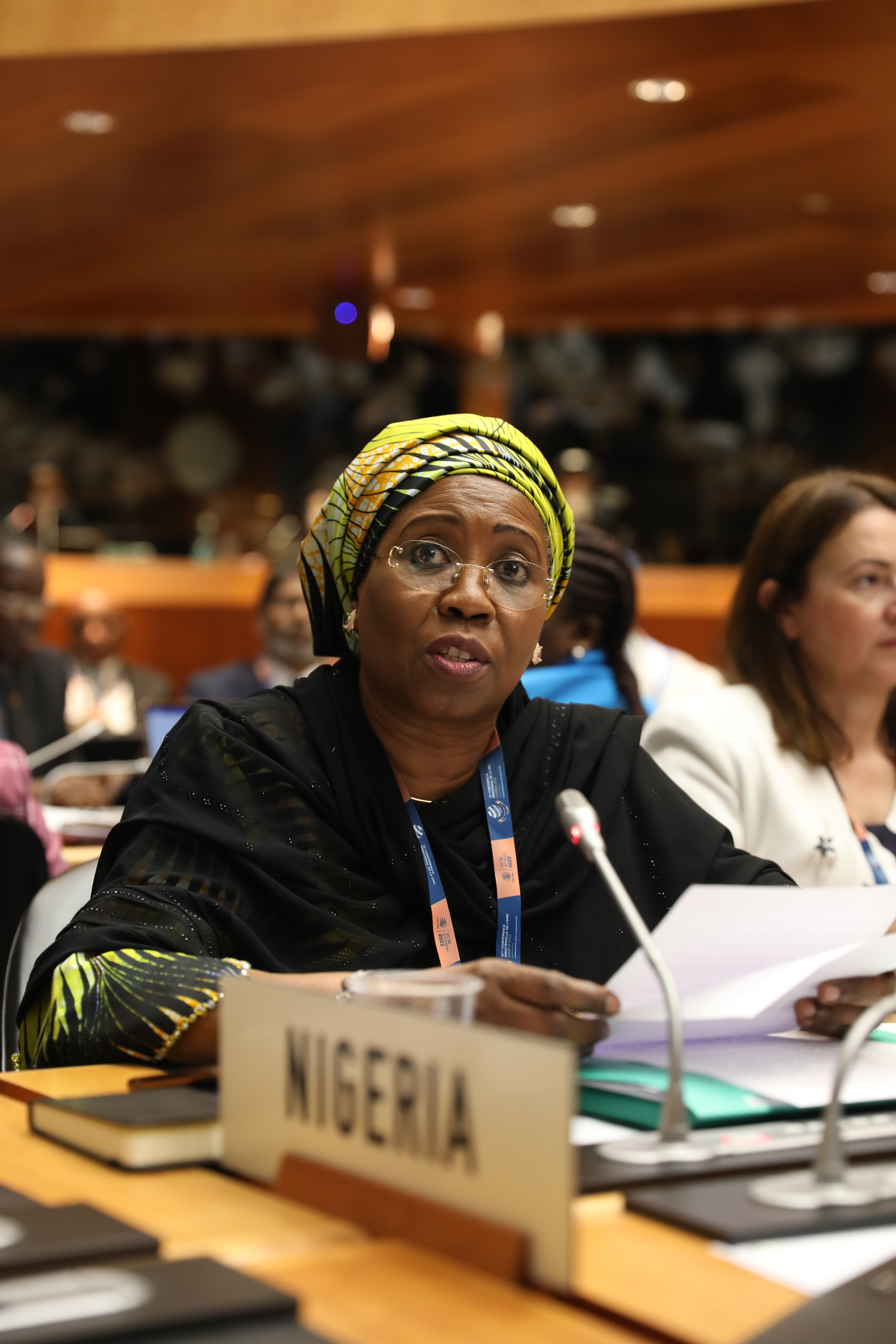

Minister of State for Industry, Trade and Investment.
- Appointed by: Muhammadu Buhari

Personal details
- Born: 18 November 1954 (age 71)
- Education: University of Lagos, Ahmadu Bello University, Zaria

Mariam Yalwaji Katagum (born November 18, 1954, Azare, Bauchi State), serves as Nigeria's Minister of State for Industry, Trade and Investment. Previously, Katagum was Ambassador, Permanent Delegate of Nigeria to UNESCO.

== Education ==
In 1976, Mariam Y. Katagum obtained a Bachelor of Arts in English and a Graduate Certificate in Education at the Ahmadu Bello University, Zaria. In 1985, she earned a Master in Administration and Planning at the University of Lagos. In 1999, Katagum obtained a Certificate in Social Development Policy, Planning and Practice at the University College, London. The same year she was awarded a UNESCO Fellowship.

== Career ==
Katagum started her professional career with National Youth Service, at the Water Board, Jos. In 1977-1981, Katagum was a Senior Education Officer at the Federal Government College, Azare. Later she served at Federal Scholarship Board, Lagos (1981-1984).

Next fifteen years she was posted to the Nigerian National Commission for UNESCO (1985-2000). In 2000-2001, Katagum was a Director for Special Projects at the National Primary Education Commission in Abuja. Starting from 2001, Katagum served as the Secretary General of the Nigerian National Commission for UNESCO. In 2004, Katagum gave a final speech at UNU-UNESCO Conference on Wars in the 21st Century in Paris. Starting from 2006 Katagum was supervising the National and International Partnership Division of the Federal Ministry of Education. In June 2009, Katagum was appointed Ambassador, Permanent Delegate of Nigeria to UNESCO.

She served on a number of national and international Committees and Panels including the Board of Trustees of the African World Heritage Fund (2009-2011), the West Africa Group in UNESCO (2009-2012), the E-9 Group in UNESCO (2010-2012), the UNESCO Headquarter’s Committee (2011-2013), the PX Commission of the Executive Board (2013) and others.

In 2017, Katagum attended Gala Night of the Africa Week, 2017 organized by the Africa Group at UNESCO Headquarters in Paris.

In July 2019, Katagum was nominated as a Minister of State for Industry, Trade and Investment from Bauchi state in Nigeria by the president Muhammadu Buhari. As a Minister of State for Industry, Trade and Investment, Katagum advocates implementation of the African Continental Free Trade Area (AfCFTA) as vital to achieving the gains which Nigeria stands to benefit.
