= Adisa =

Adisa is a surname. Notable people with the surname include:

- Abdulkareem Adisa (died 2005), Nigerian general
- Alao Fatai Adisa (born 1986), Nigerian footballer
- Lawrence Adisa (born 1968), American actor, producer and writer
- Opal Palmer Adisa (born 1954), Jamaican-born American poet and academic
- Tunde Adisa, Nigerian para table tennis player

== See also ==
- Adisa Andwele, Barbadian poet
- Adisa Isaac (born 2001), American football player
- Asset Disposal and Information Security Alliance
