= Adisa Andwele =

Barbadian poet

- Born: Michael Richards; Rockhall, St. Thomas, Barbados
- Occupation: Poet
- Children: 3
- Writing career
- Genre: Rhythm poetry
- Notable awards: Barbados Poet of the Year (1991); Author of the Year (Barbados) (1992)

Michael Richards, better known as Adisa Andwele, is a rhythm poet from Barbados. Adisa has performed at many different places such as pubs, theatres, music and literature festivals, schools, day centres for senior citizens, and Buckingham Palace. He has earned many achievements during his career, including Hackney Poet Laureate and a winner of 'New Performance Poet of the Year'. In 2009 and 2010, Adisa toured England with his one-person show '1968 - The Year That Never Ended'. Some of the countries he has performed in are Switzerland, Botswana, Italy, Nigeria, and Sweden.

== Biography ==
Born in Rock Hall, St. Thomas, Richards first found fame in the late 1970s with the poetry collection Whispers in the Spirit. He began working with musicians, incorporating Caribbean rhythms with his poems, and appeared with the Re-emergence band. A second collection, Rhythm an' Roots, was published in 1989, and Richards became the first poet to stage a solo performance in Barbados in 1990. In 1991, the album Mike Richards and the Re-Emergence Band Live was issued, and Richards was named Barbados Poet of the Year. A third collection of poetry, Black Distant Voice, was published in 1992, winning him the Author of the Year award. That year he adopted the stage name Adisa Andwele.

His second album, Conscious, was released in 1993, and he began performing in the US and Canada. He signed to Eddy Grant's Ice label in the mid-1990s and released the album Doin' It Safe in 1990, recorded with the band Jamari.

More recently, Andwele has acted as coordinator of the 'Soca Royale' competition.

== Publications ==
- Whispers in the Spirit (1979)
- Rhythm an' Roots (1989)
- Black Distant Voice (1992)
- Riot in the Land
- Antiquity (2002), Peepal Tree
- Crop Over (2003), WOW Caribbean

== Discography ==
- Mike Richards and the Re-Emergence Band Live (1991)
- Conscious (1993)
- Doin' It Safe (2000), Ice
