= Theophilus Adeleke Akinyele =

Nigerian business consultant and civil servant (1932–2020)

- Born: 29 February 1932; Ibadan, Nigeria
- Died: 26 October 2020 (aged 88)
- Education: University of Ibadan; Oxford University; University of Connecticut; Harvard Business School
- Occupations: business consultant civil servant

Chief Theophilus Adeleke Akinyele (29 February 1932 – 26 October 2020) was a Nigerian business consultant and civil servant.

== Early life and education ==
Akinyele was born in Ibadan. He obtained a BA from the University College Ibadan (now the University of Ibadan) in 1959. He also studied at Oxford University, the University of Connecticut, and Harvard Business School.

== Career ==
He served as Permanent Secretary in the Ministries of Agriculture and Finance of the old Western State of Nigeria, Registrar and Secretary to the Council of the University of Ife (now Obafemi Awolowo University), Ile-Ife Nigeria, Secretary to the Military Government and Head of the Civil Service of Oyo State, and also as the Director of Budget and Special Adviser on Budget Affairs to President Shehu Shagari from 1979 to 1983. After retiring from public service, Akinyele worked as a consultant.

He held the chieftaincy title of Bobajiro of Ibadan land and was an Officer of the Order of the Niger.
