= Graham Family Hall =

Residence hall at the University of Notre Dame

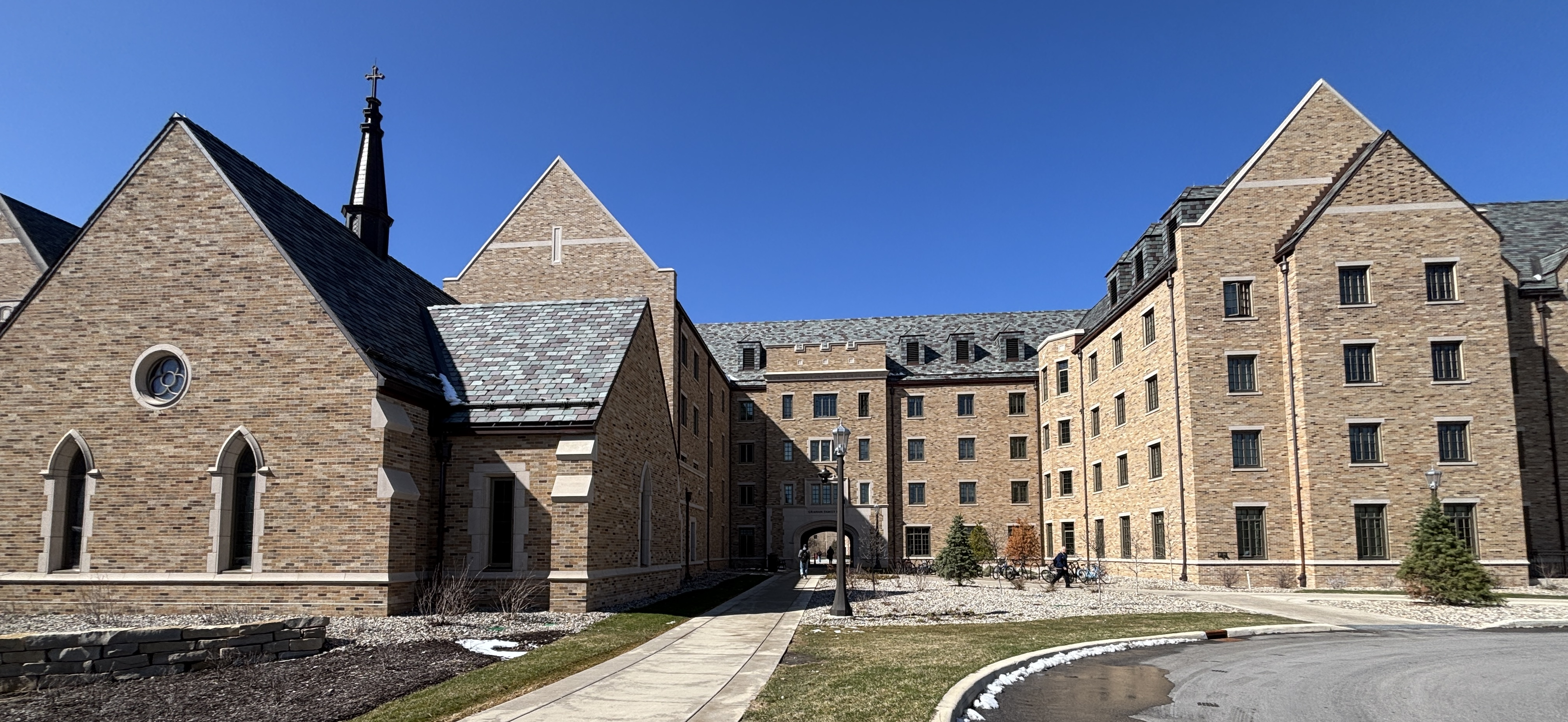
- Graham Family Hall

- Arms: Lozengy purpure and argent, a lion rampant or crowned or armoured and tongued gules holding in his dexter paw a sceptre or
- Campus quad: East
- Coordinates: 41°42′15″N 86°13′55″W
- Motto: Vade et fac similiter
- Motto in English: Go and do likewise
- Established: 2024
- Architect: Mackey Mitchell Architects
- Architectural style: Modern Collegiate Gothic vernacular
- Colors: Purple and Gold
- Rector: Rev. Bill Dailey, C.S.C.
- Benefactor: Tracy and Kerie Graham
- Undergraduates: 262
- Postgraduates: 2
- Chapel: Saint Augustine
- Mascot: Royals
- Sports: Football, Lacrosse, Soccer, Basketball, Hockey, Baseball
- Major events: Go and Do Likewise Dinner
- Website: Website

Map
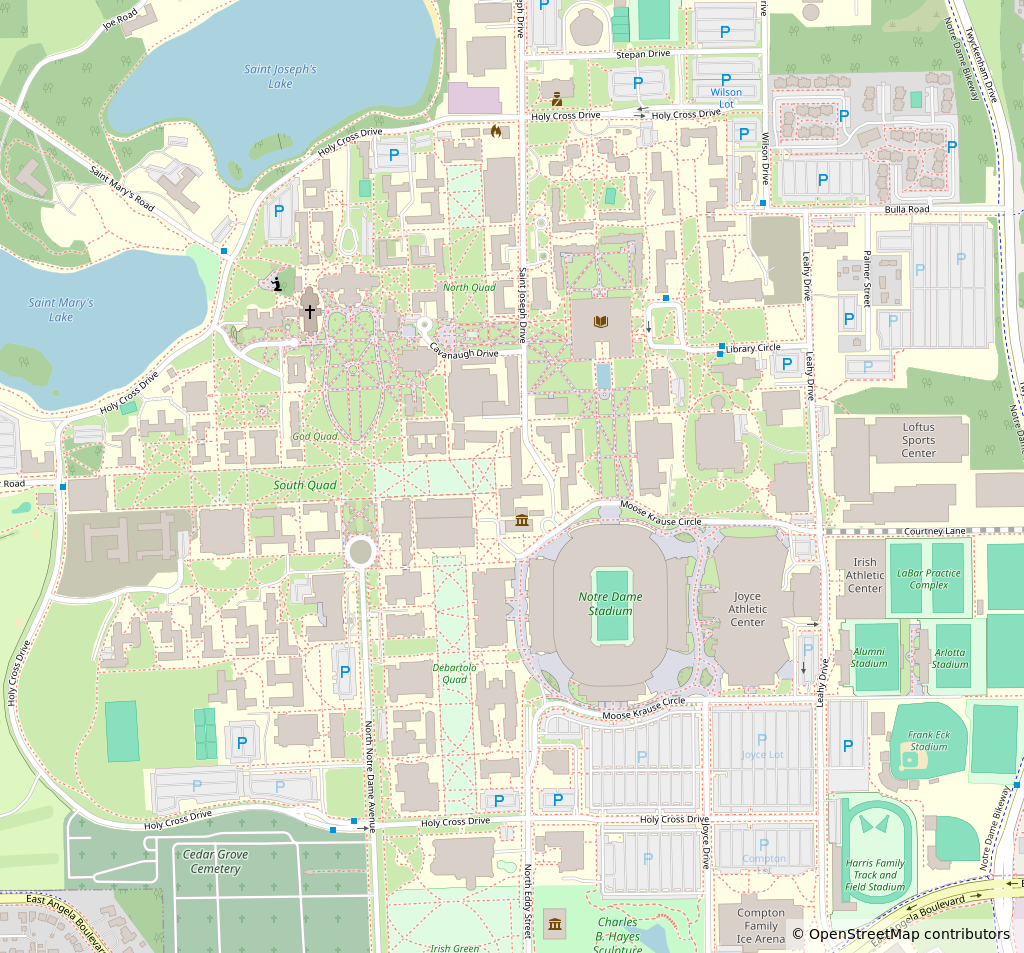
- Location within Notre Dame, Indiana

Graham Family Hall is one of the 33 Residence Halls on the campus of the University of Notre Dame and one of the 17 male dorms. It is located on East Quad, between McCourtney and Johnson Family Hall. Built in 2024, it welcomed the community of the demolished Pangborn Hall.

== History ==
Notre Dame embarked in a thorough renovation of dormitories with the 2015 Residential Master Plan. In 2016, when the first renovation started, the Pangborn Hall community moved into Flaherty Hall and Pangborn was converted into a "swing hall", that would host the residents of the hall undergoing a renovation. It hosted members of Walsh Hall for the 2016–17 academic year, members of Badin Hall for the 2017–2018 year, and members of Morrissey Hall for the 2018–2019 year. In the 2019–2020 Pangborn housed the members of a new community to move into Johnson Family Hall. Due to the COVID-19 pandemic, Pangborn was used as housing for female students who had study abroad plans canceled as well as transfer students for the 2020–21 academic year. This brought change to the identity of Pangborn with the Phoenix selected as the new mascot and the Pang-Pong ping pong tournament as their signature event. However, with the closure of Zahm Hall beginning in the 2021–22 school year, Zahm became a new transition dorm in place of Pangborn, and Pangborn once again become a full time dorm for men under rector Fr. Bill Dailey, CSC. Upon being reestablished as a mens dorm again, the new members of Pangborn Hall chose "The Royals" as their mascot to fit the long time nickname of the hall, "The Pangborn Palace". They adopted a gold and purple coat of arms with a lion, a previous symbol of Pangborn; two lion statues had adorned Pangborn since its construction. The new mens hall members also introduced traditions such as bedsheet banners for Notre Dame football games and cutting racing stripes into their hair as a sign of unity within the dorm.

In 2023 it was announced that Fisher and Pangborn halls would be demolished and replaced with new dorms. The residents of Pangborn transferred to the newly built Graham Family Hall, preserving many of its traditions.

=== Construction ===
The building was donated by Tracy and Kerie Graham. Tracy is the founder of a technology-related private equity firm and a member of the Notre Dame Board of Trustees. Kerie, his wife, serves on the board of various St. Joseph County organizations.

Construction started in the summer of 2022 and it was conducted by the Larson-Danielson firm and was finished by the fall of 2024. The building is 79,000 square feet and was designed by Mackey Mitchell Architects in modern collegiate gothic architecture in the campus tradition. The first floor features an arch that serves as both entrance as well as a passageway for pedestrians, and it a recognizable symbol of the building. On one side of the first floor arch are communal areas while the other side features study spaces, a reading room and the chapel.

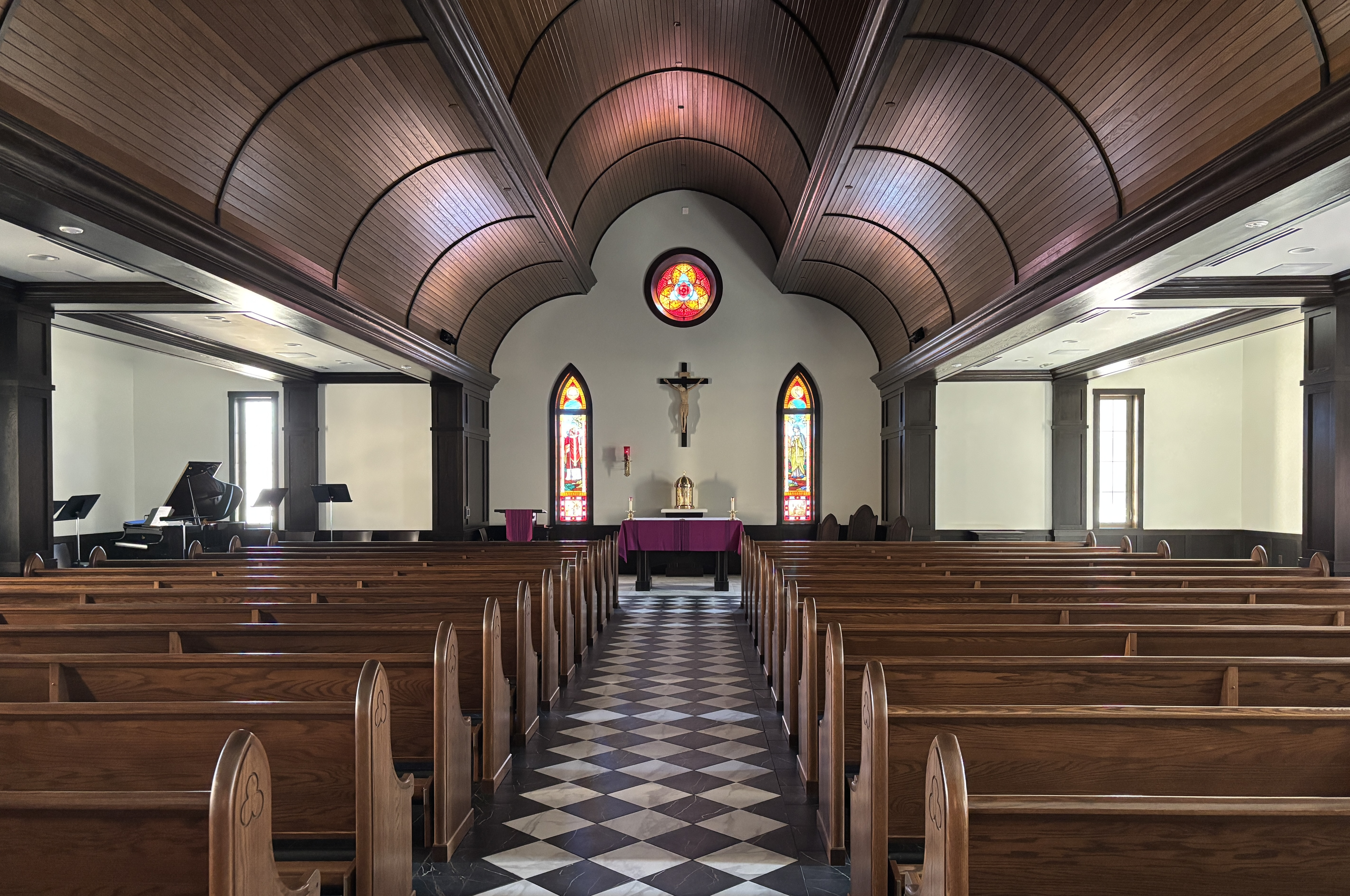
The Chapel of St. Augustine in Graham Family Hall

The chapel, dedicated to St. Augustine was dedicated on August 30, 2024, by bishop Kevin C. Rhodes. It has achieves LEED Gold certification. Rev Bill Dailey, CSC, returned from four years in Ireland to serve as the first Rector of Graham Family Hall. He oversees residents in seven sections capable of housing up to 262 students.

== Description ==
Notre Dame has an undergraduate hall system which blends the residential college system and the house system. All first-year students are placed in one of the 32 halls upon enrollment, and students rarely switch halls. Each hall has its own spirit, tradition, mascot, sport teams, events, dances and reputation. Graham Family Hall's mascot is the Royals, while its colors are purple and gold. Johnson Family Hall host two signature events. The first is the Johnson Family Feud—a Notre Dame rendition of the hit show Family Feud where dorms compete for the Golden Valkyrie. The second is "Ride of the Valks" a tradition of running through the Notre Dame Library Reflection Pool early in the morning of the first home game. It has achieves LEED Gold certification.

The first floor sports an arched opening, creating a distinctive walkway that connects the building and provides east–west access along the existing sidewalk. One side of the floor houses communal areas, while the other features quiet study spaces, a reading room, and the hall chapel. Graham Family Hall is composed of variety of student accommodations, including singles, doubles, quads, and six-person rooms. Each floor includes a community lounge with kitchens or kitchenettes, while fitness, laundry, and other facilities are situated on the lower level. The west side of the building features an outdoor patio. The chapel features stained glass windows of Augustine of Hippo and Saint Monica.
