= Johnson Family Hall =

Residence hall at the University of Notre Dame

Jonson Family Hall
- University of Notre Dame
- Arms: Azure a chevron argent, in chief two winged horses respectant argent, in base a cross fleury argent
- Location: Notre Dame, IN
- Campus quad: East
- Coordinates: 41.7047°N 86.2321°W
- Established: 2020
- Named for: Todd, Susan, Matt, and Hilary Johnson
- Architect: Mackey Mitchell Architects
- Architectural style: Modern Collegiate Gothic vernacular
- Colors: Navy and light blue
- Gender: Female
- Rector: Sara Ghyselinck
- Undergraduates: 225
- Postgraduates: 2
- Chapel: St. Teresa of Calcutta
- Mascot: Valkyries
- Charities: YWCA of North Central Indiana
- Major events: Johnson Family Feud & Empower Self-defense Class
- Website: website

Map
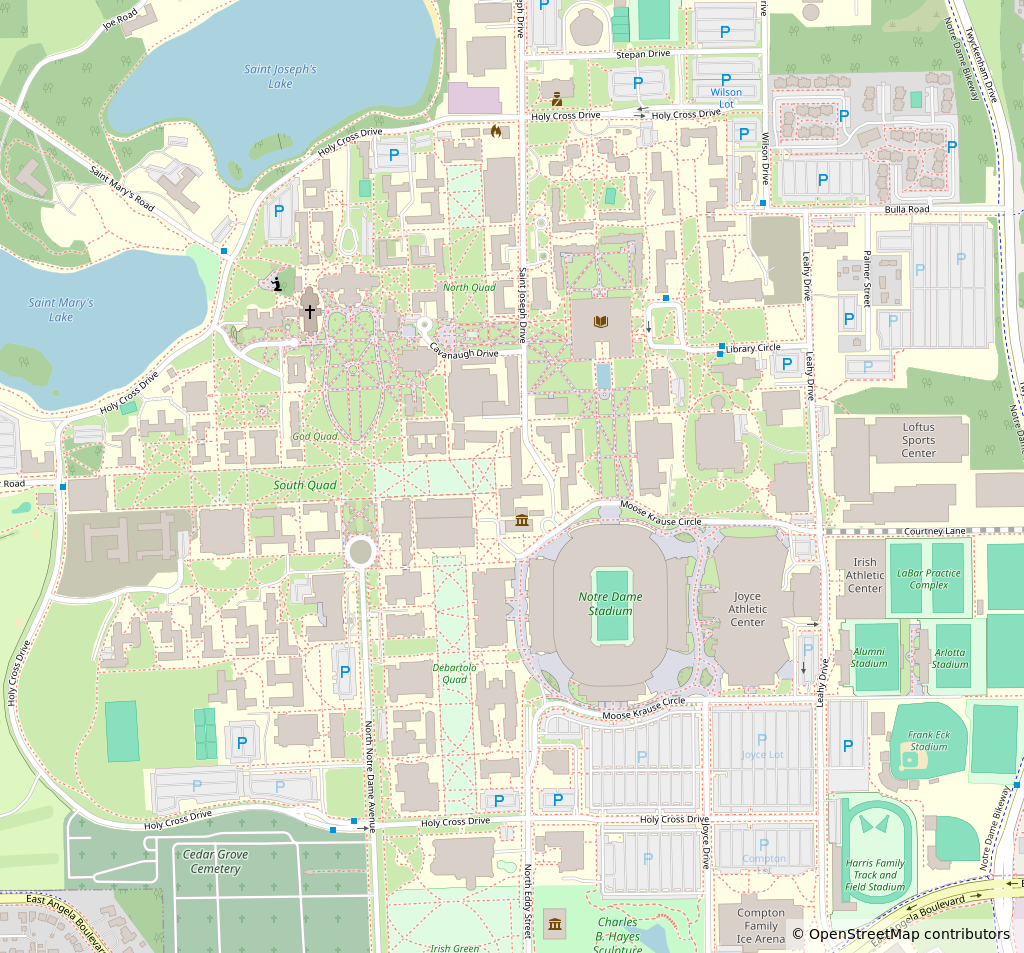
- Location within Notre Dame, Indiana

Johnson Family Hall is one of the 32 residence halls at the University of Notre Dame. It is located east of Dunne Hall and north of McCourtney Hall in the East Quadrangle. It is the newest women's residence hall, built in 2019–2020, after a donation from Todd & Susan Johnson. Its mascot is the valkyrie, and its colors are navy and light blue. It was opened during the COVID-19 pandemic in 2020 .

== History ==
Construction started on December 10, 2018. The hall was expected to be completed and ready for occupancy by August 2020. On Friday, September 6, 2019, the new Residence Hall's name was announced to be Johnson Family Hall. Todd, Susan, Matthew and Hilary Johnson of Duluth, Minnesota, donated $20 million. The Johnson family members are members of Notre Dame's Cavanaugh Council, Badin Guild and Boldly Notre Dame campaign cabinet. Matthew and Hilary are also Notre Dame alumni.

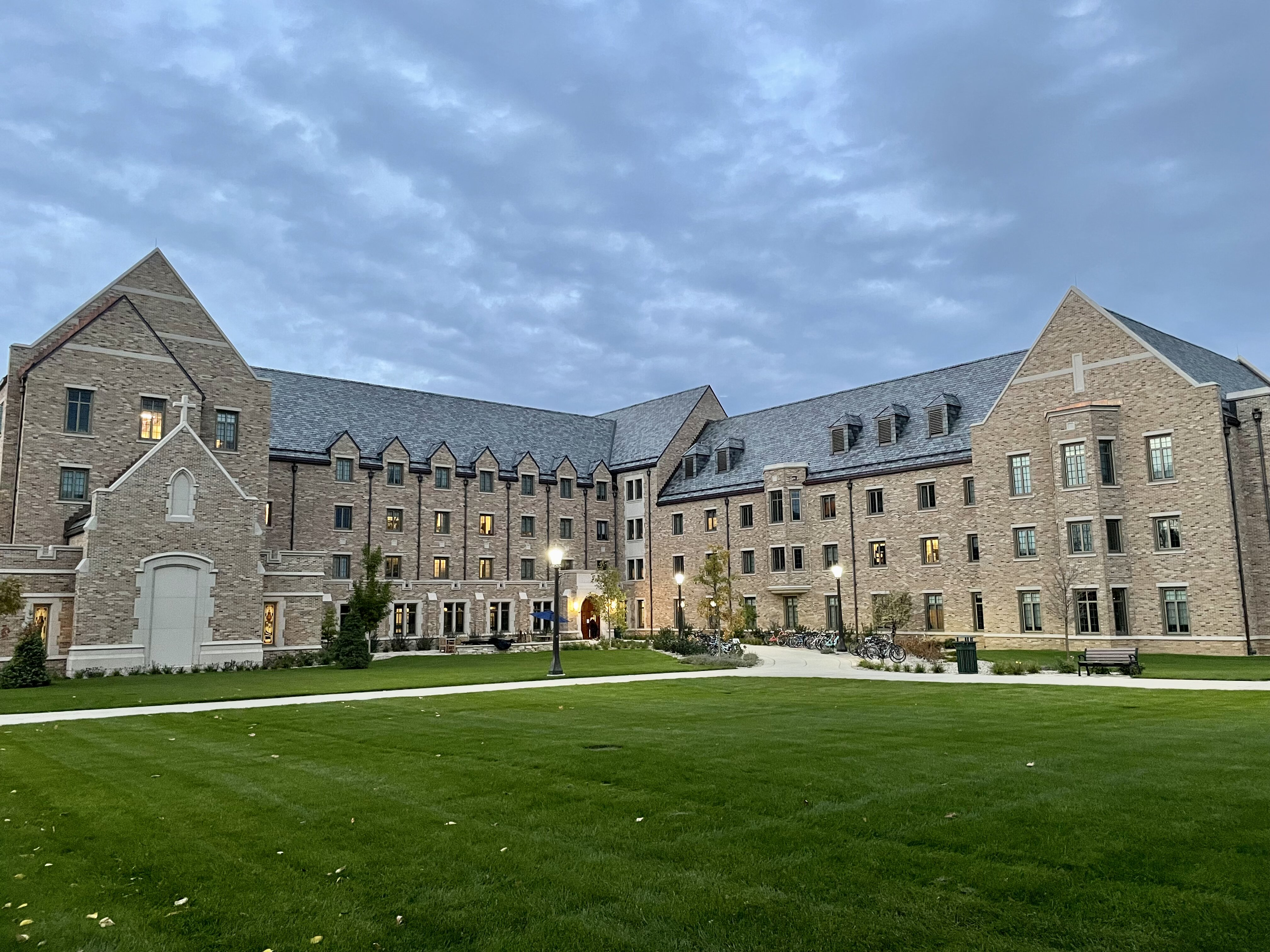
Johnson Family Hall seen from the south, with its main entrance

In the spring of 2019, the university administration gave enrolled female students the option to move into Pangborn Hall, which at the time was functioning as a swing dorm for halls undergoing renovation, to gain a guaranteed spot in the new residence hall for the 2020-2021 year. The new community formed in the fall of 2019, led by rector Amanda Springstead, and was known as the Pangborn-Johnson Community (nicknamed PB&J). On September 8, 2019, after the announcement of the hall's new name, the community took group hall photos both outside of both Pangborn and the under construction Johnson Family Hall.

Construction of the hall was completed in August 2020, in time for the students to move in for the fall semester, both those of the PB&J community and freshmen and new transfers. The dorm was opened during the COVID-19 pandemic, during which campus life as subject to several restrictions and regulations. The chapel, dedicated to St. Theresa of Calcutta, was dedicated on September 6, 2020, by bishop Kevin C. Rhodes. For the hall's first holiday season, the Johnson family gave each resident of Pangborn a “Johnson Family Hall” quilt as a welcome gift and a way to foster community bonding. These blankets have been gifted to new Johnson Family residents every year since.

In January 2022, the building received LEED gold certification due to its environmental friendly construction and design features. The building uses geothermal energy through geothermal wells that were added during its construction. The environmentally friendly processes and strategies used in its construction also gained it an honorable mention at the 2021 U.S. Green Building Council Indiana Leadership Awards in the Green Building of the Year New Construction category.

In addition to the rector and the priest in residence, staples of the Notre Dame residential system, Johnson Family also houses resident assistants and assistant rectors.

== Description ==
Johnson Family Hall is a four-story 68,000 square feet large and hosts 225 undergraduate women. Designed by Mackey Mitchell Architects, it is built in modern collegiate gothic architecture in the campus tradition, and is fashioned along the line of projects by Kervick and Fagan and Maginnis & Walsh. Among the features it offers its residents are a community chapel, a formal reading room, study spaces, lounges, kitchens on every floor. The first floor is mostly dedicated to communal spaces while the basement hosts food options, a gym, laundry and storage areas. Rooms come in both singles, doubles, and quads. The space also houses apartments for the rector, priest-in-residence and faculty-in-residence and the rest of the hall staff.

Notre Dame has an undergraduate hall system which blends the residential college system and the house system. All first-year students are placed in one of the 32 halls upon enrollment, and students rarely switch halls. Each hall has its own spirit, tradition, mascot, sport teams, events, dances and reputation. Johnson Family Hall's mascot is the valkyrie, while its colors are navy and light blue. Johnson Family Hall host two signature events. The first is the Johnson Family Feud—a Notre Dame rendition of the hit show Family Feud where dorms compete for the Golden Valkyrie. The second is Empower - an event led by certified instructors that teaches self-defense techniques. "Ride of the Valks" is the halls first tradition- the residents run through the Notre Dame Library Reflection Pool early in the morning of the first home game.

== External links section ==
- Official website
- Description on the Residential Life website
- Campus Tour
