= Flaherty Hall (University of Notre Dame) =

Residence hall at the University of Notre Dame

- Campus quad: East
- Coordinates: 41°42′13″N 86°13′58″W
- Motto: Fortuna Audaces Iuvat (Latin)
- Motto in English: Fortune Favors the Brave
- Established: 2016
- Named for: Mary Hesburgh Flaherty
- Colors: Lavender and Navy
- Gender: Female
- Rector: Luz Hernandez
- Benefactor: Jay Flaherty '79
- Undergraduates: 226
- Chapel: Mary, Queen of Angels
- Mascot: FlaherBears
- Sports: Interhall Flag Football
- Charities: TBD
- Major events: Flaherty Fair (benefiting the Robinson Community Learning Center)
- Website: Home Page

Flaherty Hall is one of the 33 Residence Halls on the campus of the University of Notre Dame and one of the 15 female dorms. It is located on East Quad, between Knott Hall and McCourtney Hall. Built in 2016 together with its twin dorm Dunne Hall, it was the first dorm built since Ryan Hall in 2009. The coat of arms is taken from the Flaherty family, with the bears (the hall mascot) replacing the Flaherty dragons.

== History ==
Built in 2015–2016, it opened for the Fall 2016 semester. It was constructed with 20 million dollars donated by Jay Flaherty, a 1979 graduate of Notre Dame and a member of the university's board of trustees.

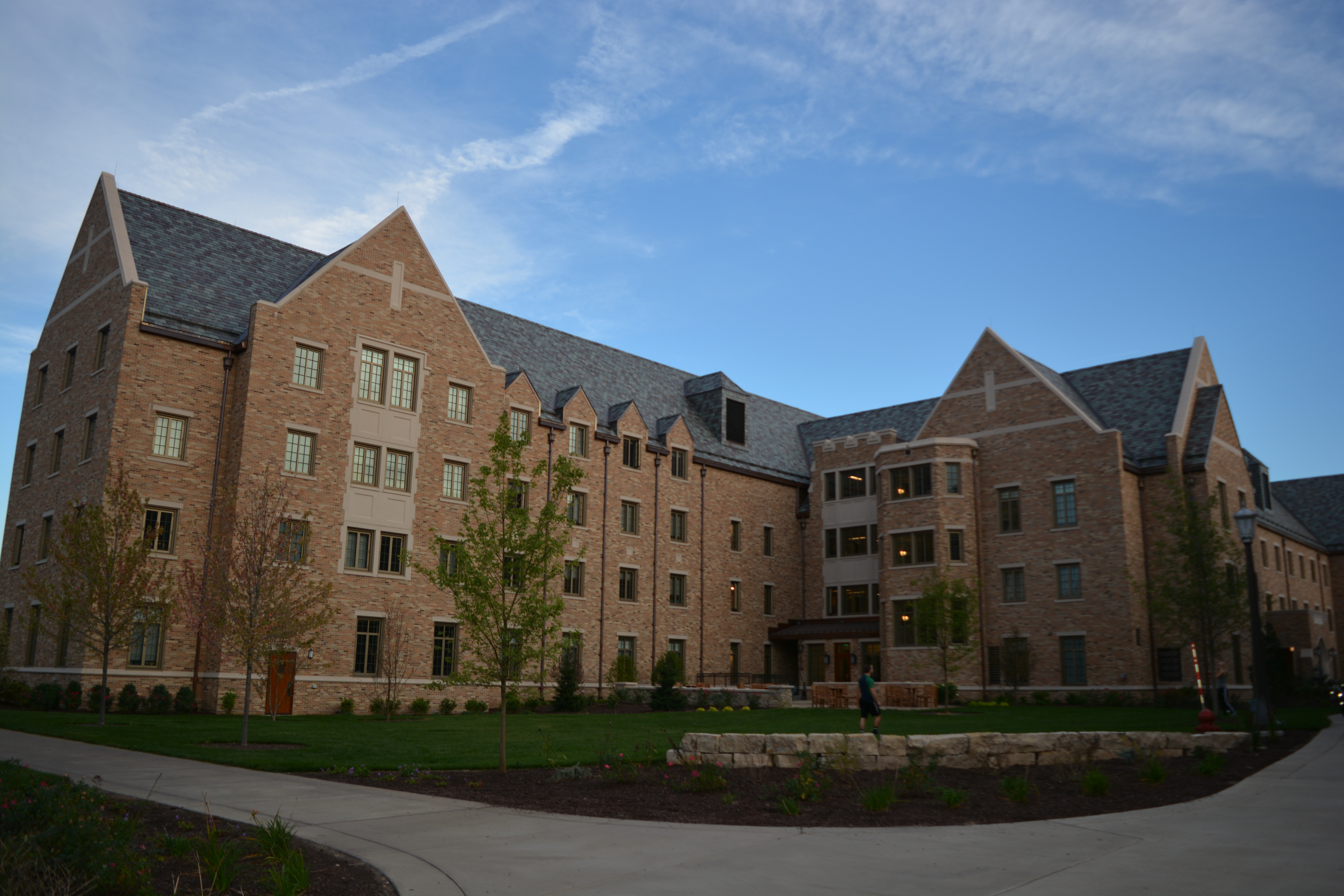
Flaherty Hall

Flaherty served for 11 years as chairman and CEO of HCP, the third largest REIT in the United States, and currently serves as managing director of a real estate joint venture with NorthStar Asset Management. Flaherty Hall is dedicated to Mary Hesburgh Flaherty, a 1979 Notre Dame graduate from one of the first classes to include women. She is a member of Notre Dame's Undergraduate Experience Advisory Council. She is also the niece of the late Rev. Theodore M. Hesburgh, C.S.C.

== Features ==
The building was built in the neo-gothic style used for other recent constructions at Notre Dame. The chapel is visible from the outside, unlike many other dorms whose chapel is inside the building. The chapel is named after Mary, Queen of Angels. Flaherty Hall is approximately 71,000 square feet. There are 116 student rooms that can host 226 students; these rooms feature singles, doubles, and quads. Half of each first floor is devoted to community spaces, featuring a two-story floor lounge, reading room, and study areas. Additional space will include pass-through floor lounges on the second, third and fourth floors, designed to promote gathering in community. The building has full kitchens adjoined to the lounge on every floor.

It opened in the fall of 2016, and it hosted the community incoming from Pangborn Hall. The colors, lavender and navy, and mascot, Bears, were chosen by popular vote by the residents.

== Gallery ==
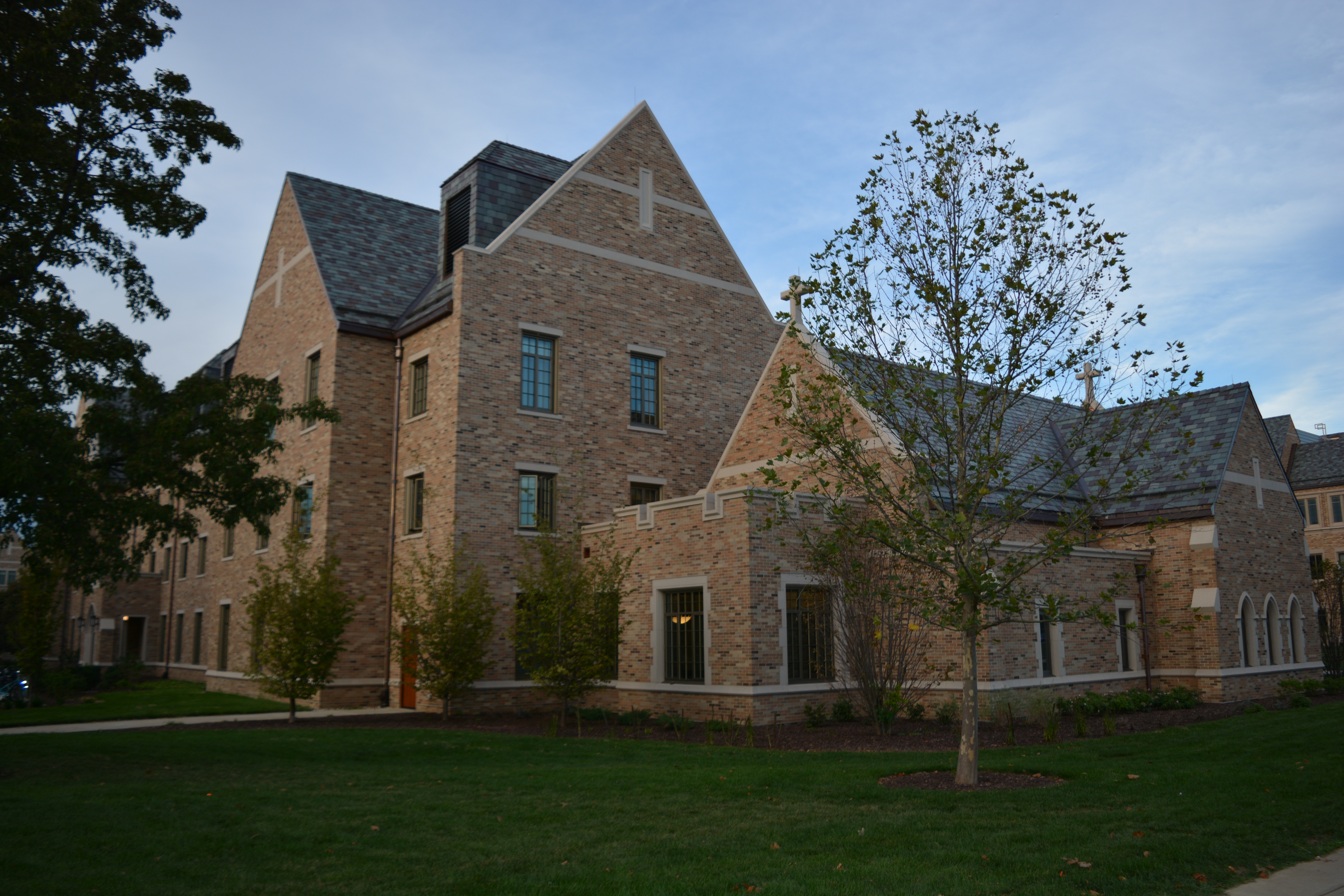
South side of Flaherty Hall, with its chapel

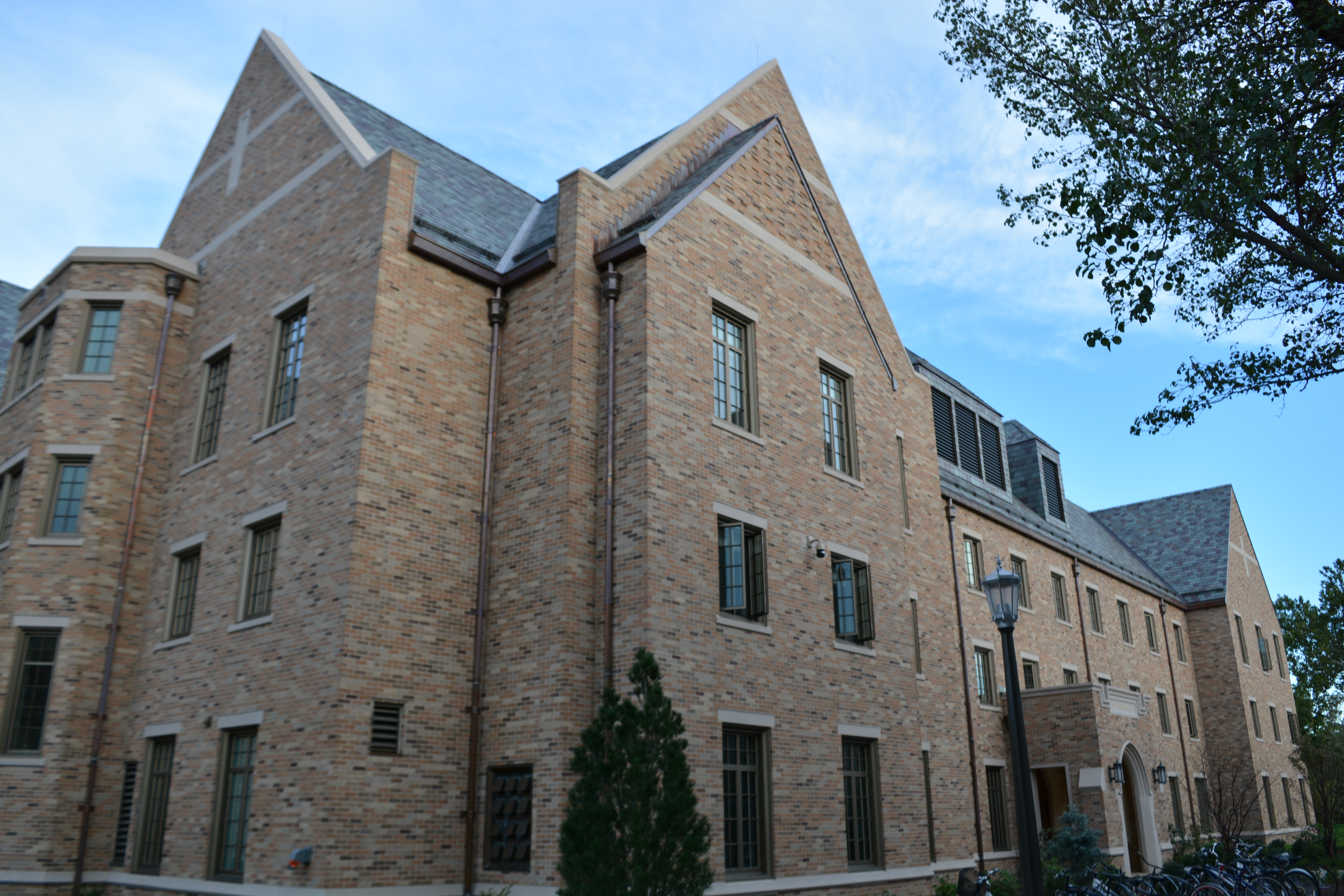
Flaherty Hall exterior

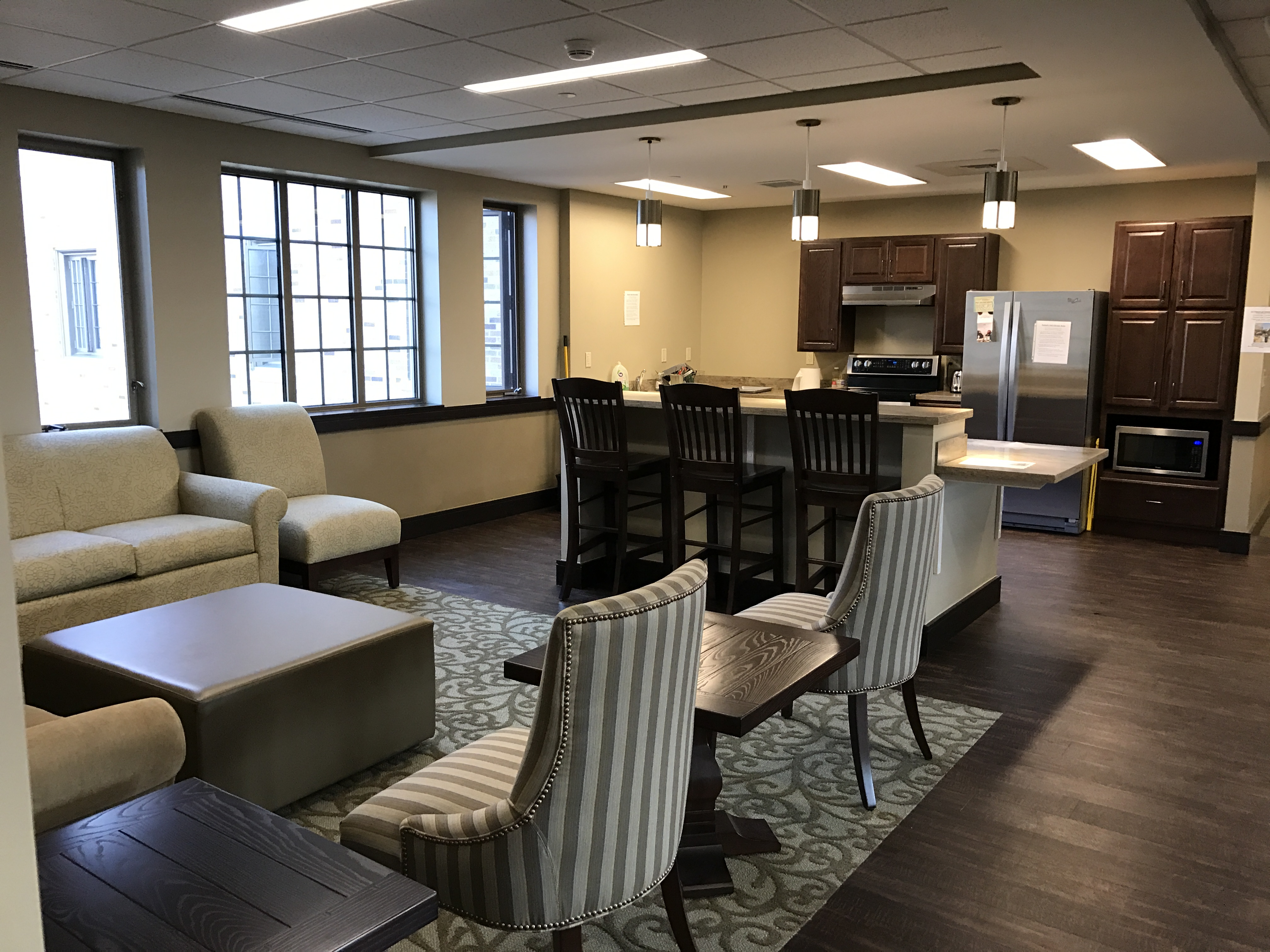
Kitchens in Flaherty Hall

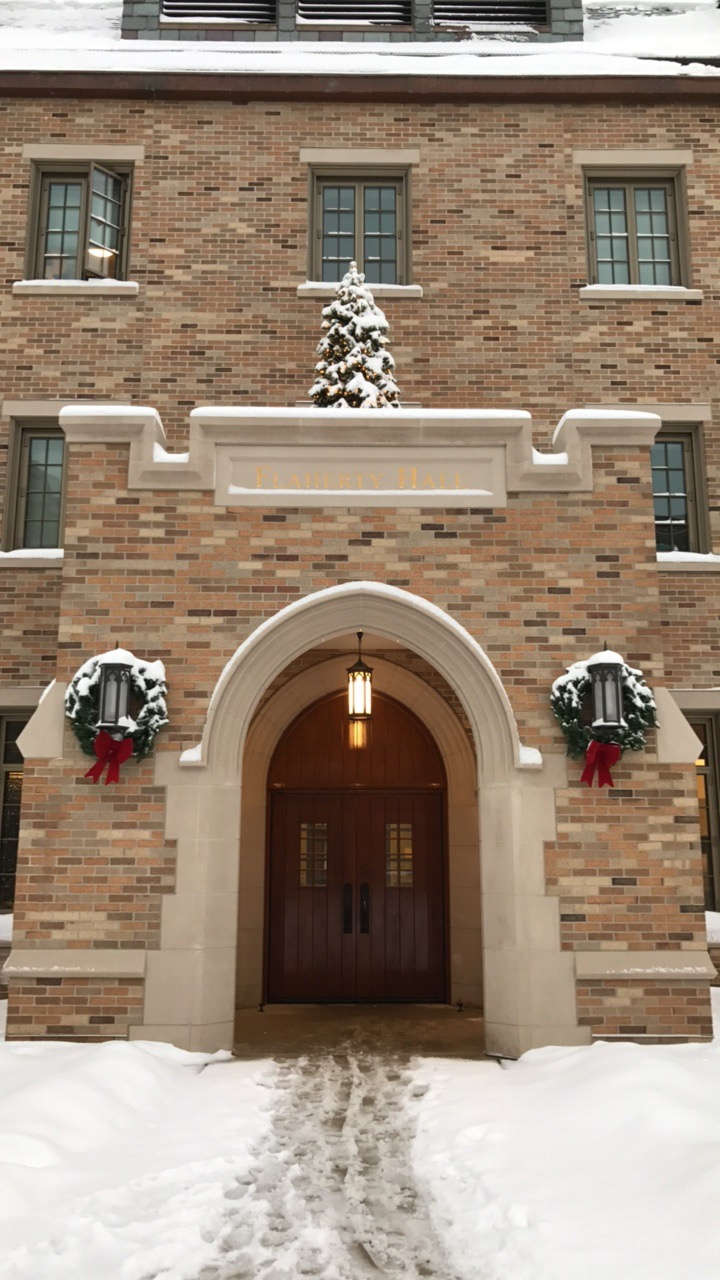
Main entrance

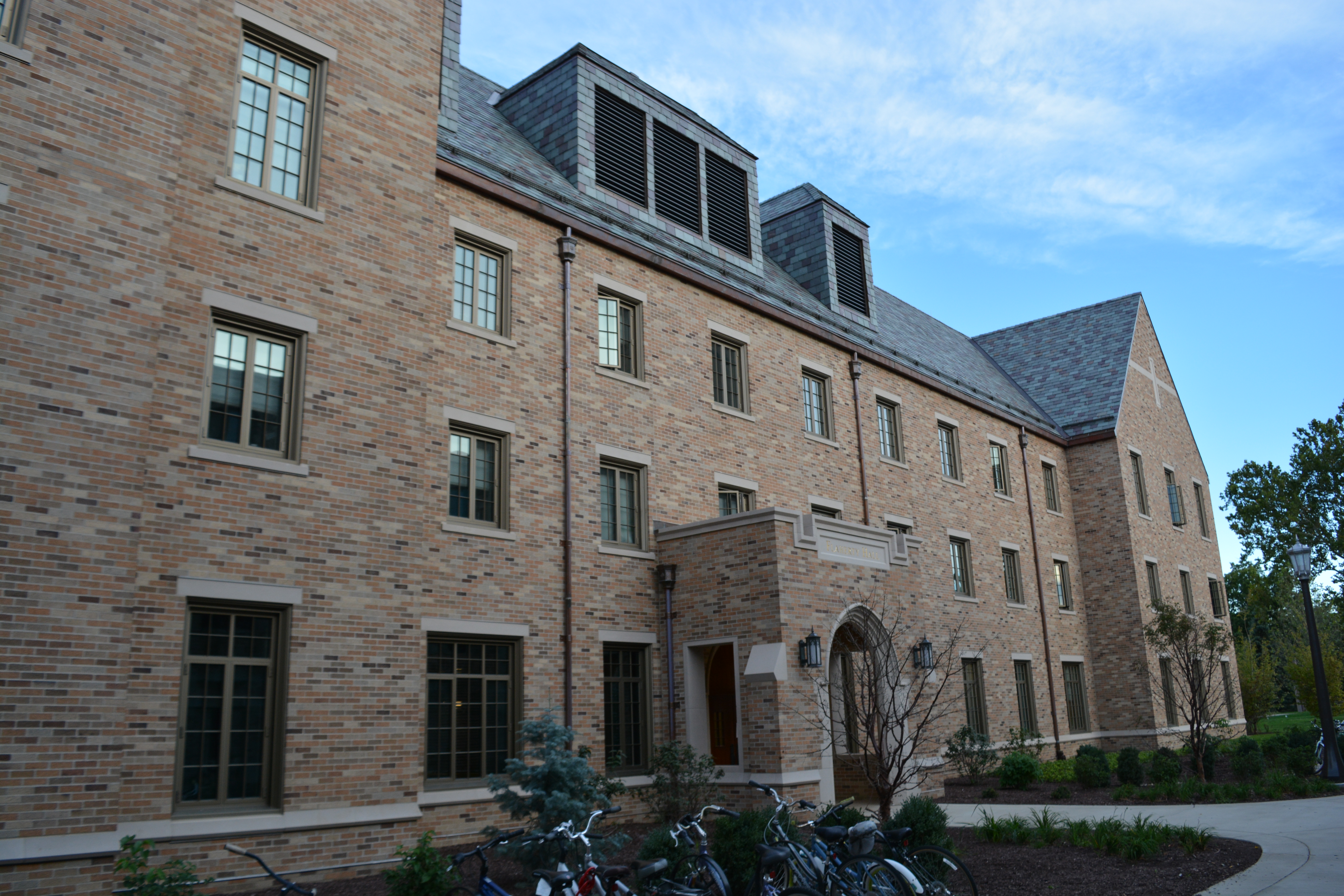
Entrance to Flaherty Hall
