= Dunne Hall (University of Notre Dame) =

Residence Hall at the University of Notre Dame

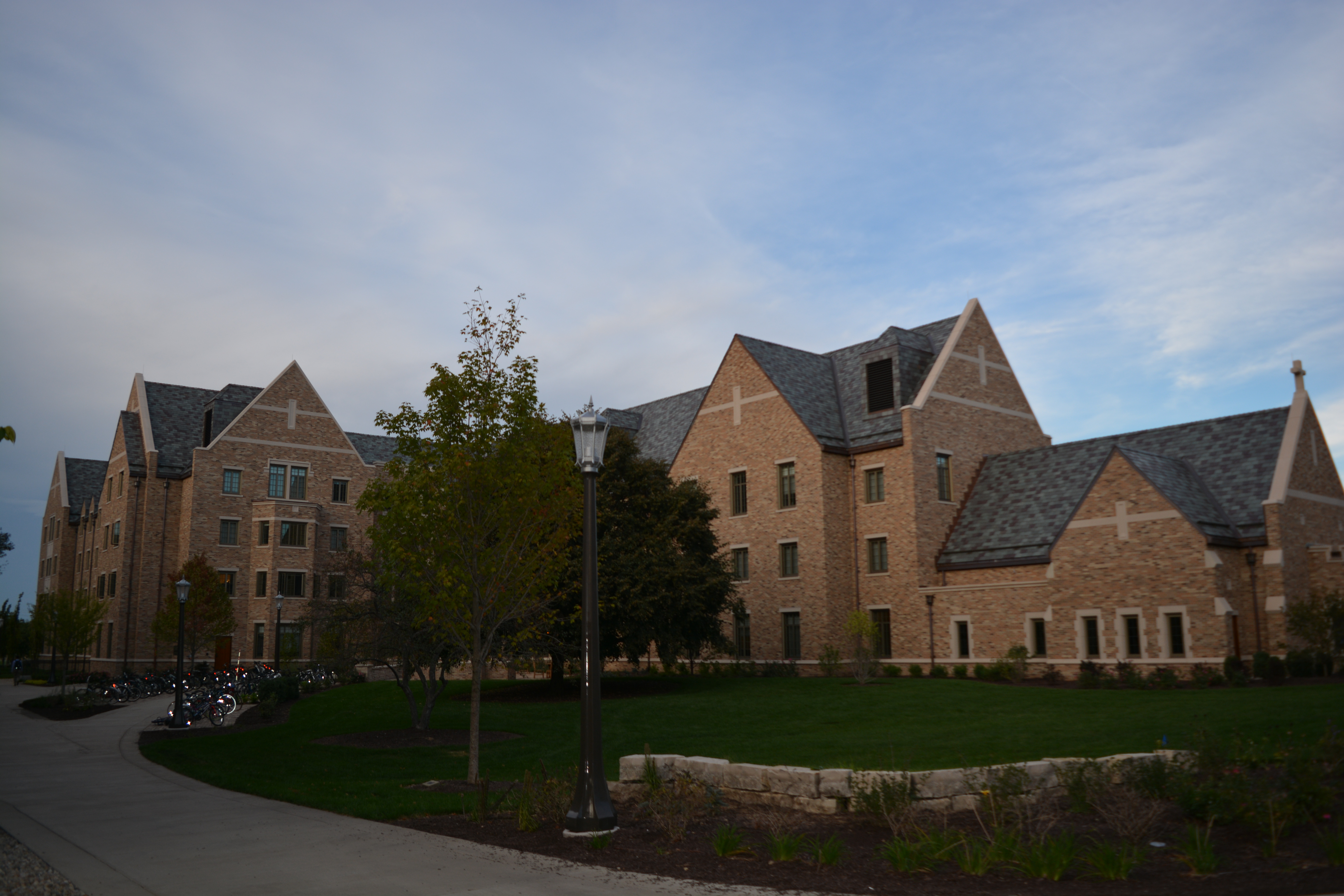
- Dunne Hall

- Campus quad: East
- Coordinates: 41°42′16″N 86°13′58″W
- Motto: Potentia Videre, Fortitudo Agere (The competence to see and the courage to act)
- Established: 2016
- Colors: Hesburgh Blue, Quad Green, Stonehenge Grey
- Rector: Collins Hess
- Benefactor: Jimmy and Susan Dunne
- Undergraduates: 221
- Postgraduates: 2
- Chapel: Blessed Basil Moreau, C.S.C
- Mascot: Sentinels
- Sports: Football, Lacrosse, Soccer, Basketball, Hockey, Baseball
- Charities: Education Bridge
- Major events: Dunne Funne Runne, Dunnedance Film Festival, Aspen in the 80's, The Feast, Dunnegle (unofficial)
- Website: Home Page

Map
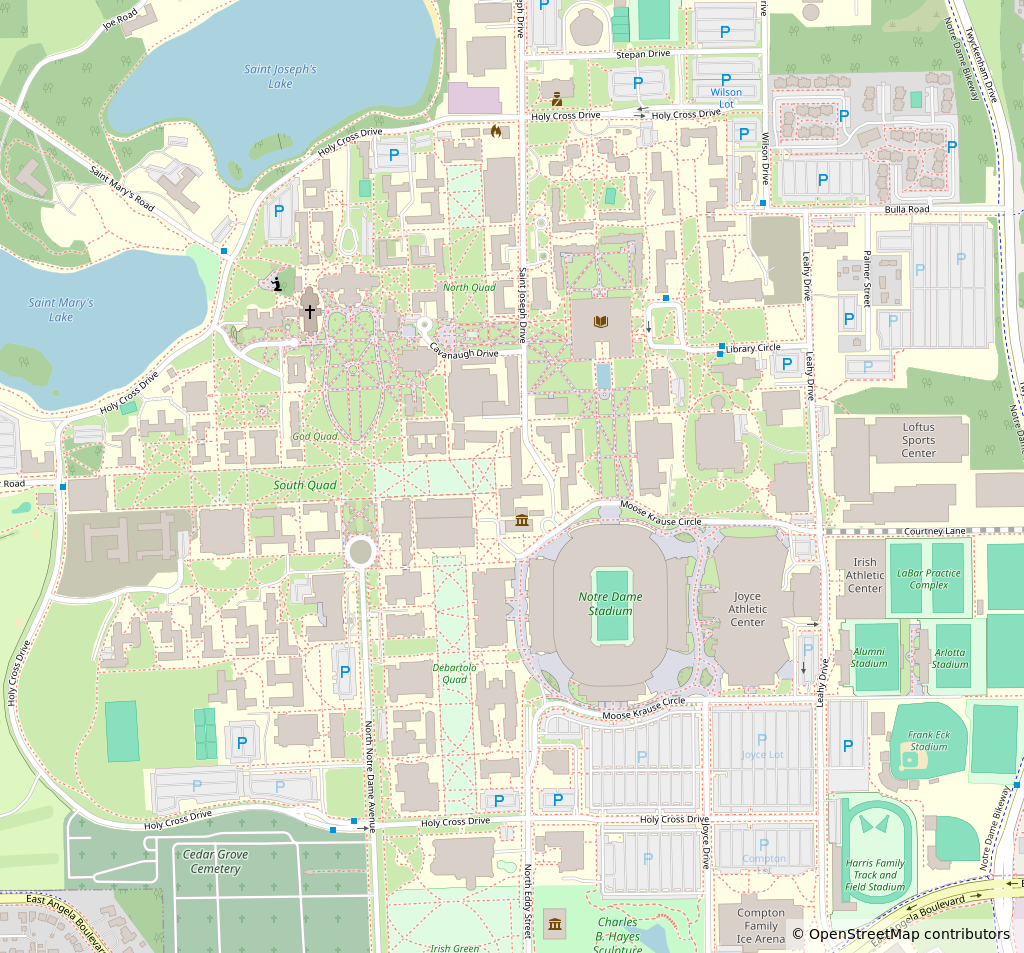
- Location within Notre Dame, Indiana

Dunne Hall is one of the newest of the 33 Residence Halls on the campus of the University of Notre Dame and one of the 17 male dorms. It is located on East Quad, between Pasquerilla East Hall and Johnson Family Hall. Built in 2016 together with its twin dorm Flaherty Hall, it was the first dorm built since Ryan Hall in 2009.

== History ==
Built in 2015–2016, Dunne Hall opened for the Fall 2016 semester. It was constructed with 20 million dollars donated by Jimmy Dunne, a 1978 Notre Dame graduate, senior managing principal of Sandler O’Neill + Partners, an investment banking firm. He is also a member of the university's board of trustees. Susan Dunne earned her bachelor's degree in business administration from Lynchburg College and for twelve years worked as an executive recruiter in New York City. The Dunne family has provided generous support to several Notre Dame fundraising initiatives and scholarship programs over the years.

Due to its environmentally friendly construction and design features, Dunne Hall received a LEED Gold certification in 2018. Its construction sourced more than 33% of building materials from the local area and employed materials with 20% recycled content. All materials were certified low-emitting and waste were minimized through the process. Compared to similar buildings, Dunne Hall uses 28% less energy and 51% less water.

== Features ==
The building was built in the neo-gothic style used for other recent constructions at Notre Dame. The chapel is visible from the outside, unlike many other dorms whose chapel is inside the building. The chapel is named after Blessed Basil Moreau, C.S.C., founder of the Congregation of Holy Cross. Dunne Hall is approximately 71,000 square feet (6,600 m^{2}). Student rooms host 221 students, and rooms feature singles, doubles, quads, and six-man rooms. Half of the first floor is devoted to community spaces, featuring a two-story lounge, reading room, and study areas. Additional space includes pass-through floor lounges on the second, third and fourth floors, designed to promote gathering in community. The building has one full kitchen, three kitchenettes adjoined to the floor lounges, and food sales in the basement.

It opened in the fall of 2016, and it hosted incoming freshmen and returning seniors, juniors, and sophomores who could apply to transfer to Dunne through the interhall application process. The colors - Quad Green, Hesburgh Blue, and Stonehenge Gray - and mascot, Sentinels, were chosen by popular vote by the residents.

Dunne also is the home to Drs. John and Karen Deak as the second lay faculty in residence, after a pilot program in Lyons Hall. In-residence faculty reside in Dunne's first-floor apartment and refine this new role as it complements hall staff and the priests-in-residence, Fr. Eric Schimmel, C.S.C. Fr. Eric is the rector of the hall, and he is a priest of the congregation of the Holy Cross. These roles recall the Notre Dame tradition of ‘bachelor dons,’ faculty members who resided in halls at periods in the University's history. The program is designed to help students thoughtfully integrate their academic lives with the formation that occurs in residence halls.

== Traditions ==
While relatively new, Dunne won Golden Hall of the Year for the 2024–2025 academic year. Dunne has also won Men's Hall of the Year for the 2017–2018 academic year. Dunne's signature events include the Dunnedance Film Festival in the spring, which showcases short films made by Dunne residents in addition to students from other residence halls, and the Dunne Funne Runne in the fall, a three-kilometre (1.9 mi) relay race accompanied by a carnival.

== Notable Alumni of Dunne ==
- Miles Boykin, NFL wide receiver
