= University of Notre Dame =

Catholic university in Notre Dame, Indiana, U.S.

University of Notre Dame du Lac
- Latin: Universitas Dominae Nostrae a Lacu
- Motto: Vita Dulcedo Spes (Latin)
- Motto in English: "Life, Sweetness, Hope"
- Type: Private research university
- Established: November 26, 1842; 183 years ago
- Founder: Edward Sorin
- Accreditation: HLC
- Religious affiliation: Roman Catholic (Congregation of Holy Cross)
- Academic affiliations: AAU; ACCU; NAICU; ORAU; URA
- Endowment: $20.09 billion (FY2025)
- President: Robert A. Dowd
- Provost: John McGreevy
- Faculty: 1,526 (fall 2023)
- Students: 13,016 (fall 2024)
- Undergraduates: 8,854 (fall 2024)
- Postgraduates: 4,162 (fall 2024)
- Location: Notre Dame, Indiana, United States; 41°42′00″N 86°14′20″W
- Campus: 1,261 acres (5.10 km^{2}); Large suburb
- Newspapers: The Observer; The Irish Rover
- Colors: Blue and gold
- Nickname: Fighting Irish
- Sporting affiliations: NCAA Division I FBS - Independent; ACC; Big Ten
- Mascot: Leprechaun
- Website: www.nd.edu

The University of Notre Dame du Lac (known simply as Notre Dame; /ˌnoʊtərˈdeɪm/ NOH-tər-DAYM; ND) is a private Catholic research university in Notre Dame, Indiana, United States. The university was founded in 1842 by members of the Congregation of Holy Cross, a Catholic religious order of priests and brothers. Its main campus covers 1,261 acres (510 ha) in a suburban setting and has landmarks such as the Golden Dome main building, Sacred Heart Basilica, the Grotto of Our Lady of Lourdes, the Word of Life mosaic mural, and Notre Dame Stadium.

Notre Dame is classified among "R1: Doctoral Universities – Very high research spending and doctorate production". In the 2025–2026 academic year 13,042 students attended Notre Dame, making it the eighth largest Catholic university in terms of enrollment in the U.S. The university is organized into seven schools and colleges: College of Arts and Letters, College of Science, Notre Dame Law School, School of Architecture, College of Engineering, Mendoza College of Business, and Keough School of Global Affairs. Notre Dame's graduate program includes more than 50 master, doctoral and professional degrees offered by the seven schools.

The university's athletic teams are members of the NCAA Division I and are known collectively as the Fighting Irish. Notre Dame is noted for its football team, which contributed to its rise to prominence on the national stage in the early 20th century. Notre Dame teams in other sports, chiefly in the Atlantic Coast Conference, have won 17 national championships.

Between 1952 and 1987, Theodore Hesburgh's administration increased the university's resources and improved its academic programs and its reputation. Its network of alumni consists of 151,000 members.

== History ==
=== Foundations ===
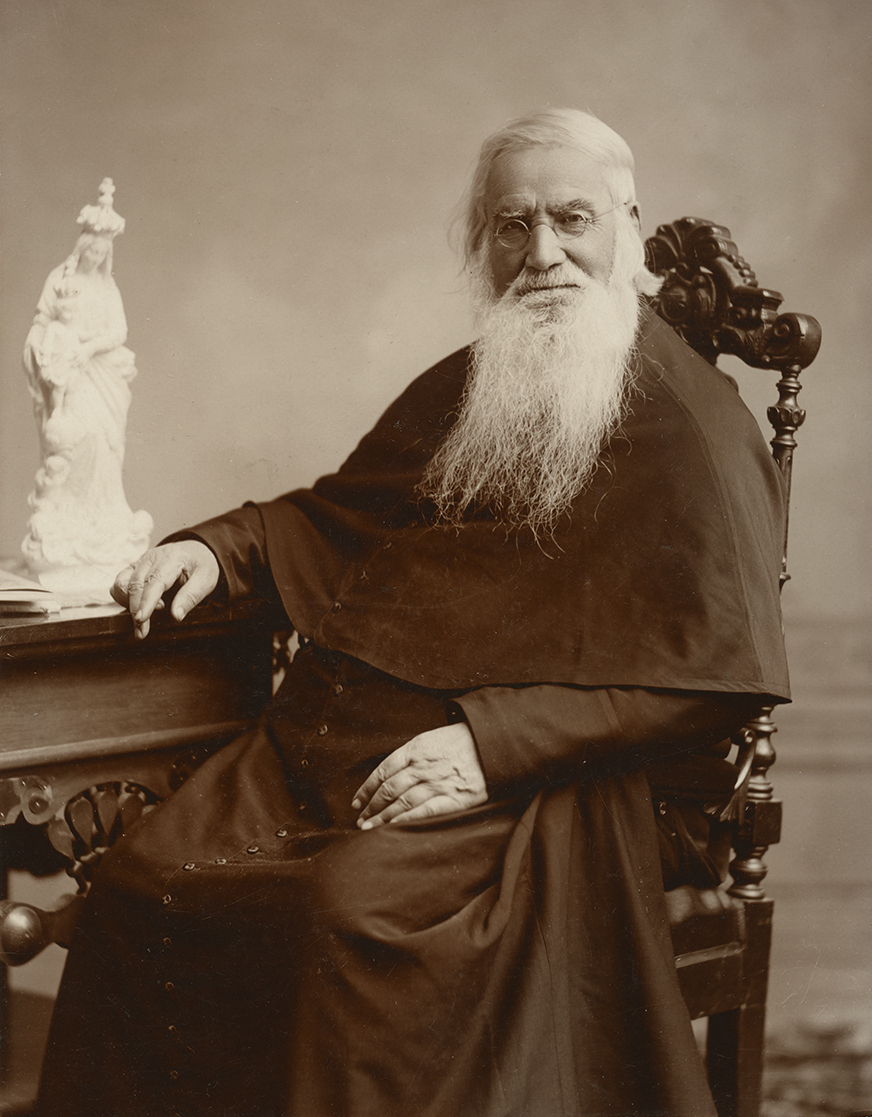
Edward Sorin, founder of the university, photographed in 1890

Stephen Badin, the first priest ordained in the United States, had come to northern Indiana after an invitation extended by Potawatomi chief Leopold Pokagon to minister to his tribe, and Badin bought the 524 acres (212 ha) of land in 1830 that became the university's campus. In 1842, bishop Célestin Guynemer de la Hailandière of the Roman Catholic Diocese of Vincennes offered the land to Edward Sorin of the Congregation of Holy Cross on the condition that he build a college in two years. Sorin arrived on the site with eight Holy Cross brothers from France and Ireland on November 26, 1842 and began the school using Badin's old log chapel. After enrolling two students, Sorin erected more buildings, including the Old College, the first church, and the first main building. Notre Dame began as a primary and secondary school; in 1844 it received its official college charter from the Indiana General Assembly, under the name of the University of Notre Dame du Lac (University of Our Lady of the Lake). (Note: The university's campus actually contains two lakes, but according to legend, when Sorin arrived at the site everything was frozen, so he thought there was only one lake and named the university accordingly.) The university was originally all-male; the Sisters of the Holy Cross founded the female-only Saint Mary's College near Notre Dame in 1844.

=== Early history ===
The college awarded its first degrees in 1849. As it grew under the presidency of Sorin and his successors, new academic programs were offered and new buildings built to accommodate the growing student and faculty population. The brief presidency of Patrick Dillon (1865–1866) saw the original main building replaced with a larger one that housed the university's administration, classrooms, and dormitories. Under William Corby's first administration, enrollment at Notre Dame increased to over 500 students. In 1869, he opened the law school, which offered a two-year course of study, and in 1871 he began construction of Sacred Heart Church, today the Basilica of the Sacred Heart. Two years later, the president Auguste Lemonnier started a library in the Main Building that had 10,000 volumes by 1879.

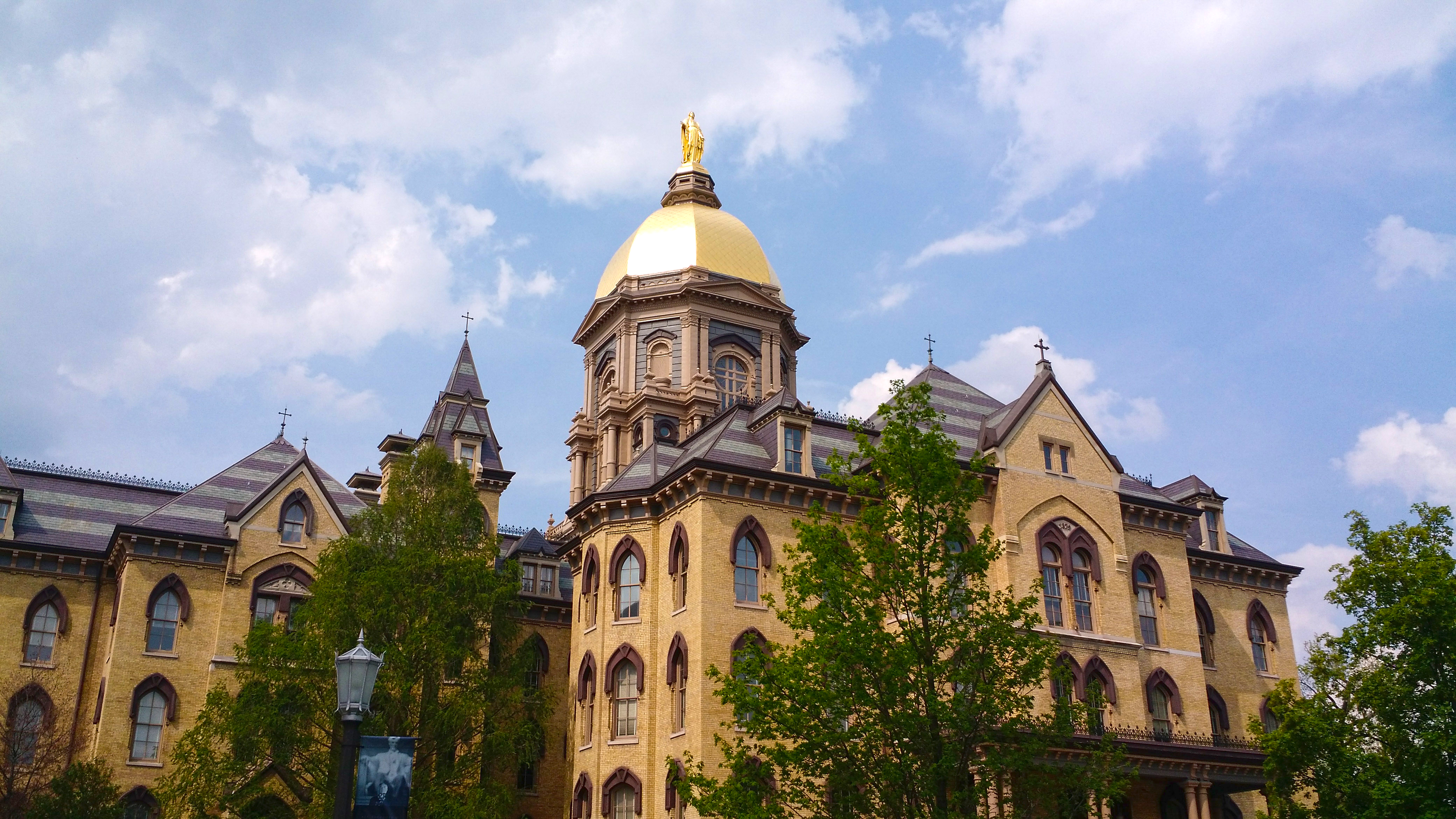
The current Main Building, built after the great fire of 1879

However, fire destroyed the Main Building and the library collection in April 1879; the school closed immediately and students were sent home. Rebuilding began on May 17, and the third and current Main Building was completed before the fall semester of 1879. The library collection was likewise redeveloped.

The presidency of Thomas E. Walsh (1881–1893) focused on improving Notre Dame's scholastic reputation and standards. At the time, many students came to Notre Dame only for its business courses and did not graduate. Walsh started a "Belles Lettres" program and invited notable lay intellectuals like writer Maurice Francis Egan to campus. Washington Hall was built in 1881 as a theater, and the Science Hall (today the LaFortune Student Center) was built in 1883 to house the science program (established in 1880) and multiple classrooms and science labs. The construction of Sorin Hall saw the first freestanding residence hall on campus and one of the first in the country to have private rooms for students, a project championed by Sorin and John Zahm. During Walsh's tenure, Notre Dame started its football program and awarded its first Laetare Medal, one the earlist such honors bequesthed by a Catholic university in the United States. The Law School was reorganized under the leadership of William J. Hoynes (dean from 1883 to 1919), and when its new building was opened shortly after his death, it was renamed in his honor.

=== Growth ===
John Zahm was the Holy Cross Provincial for the United States from 1898 to 1906, with overall supervision of the university. He sought to modernize and expand Notre Dame by erecting buildings and adding to the campus art gallery and library, amassing what became a famous Dante collection, and pushing Notre Dame toward becoming a research university dedicated to scholarship. The congregation did not renew Zahm's term, fearing he had expanded Notre Dame too quickly and had run the order into serious debt. In particular, his vision to make Notre Dame a research university was at odds with that of Andrew Morrissey, president from 1893 to 1905, who had hoped to keep the institution a smaller boarding school. Morrissey's presidency remained largely focused on younger students and saw the construction of the Grotto, the addition of wings to Sorin Hall, and the erection of the first gymnasium. By 1900, student enrollment had increased to over 700, with most students still following the Commercial Course.

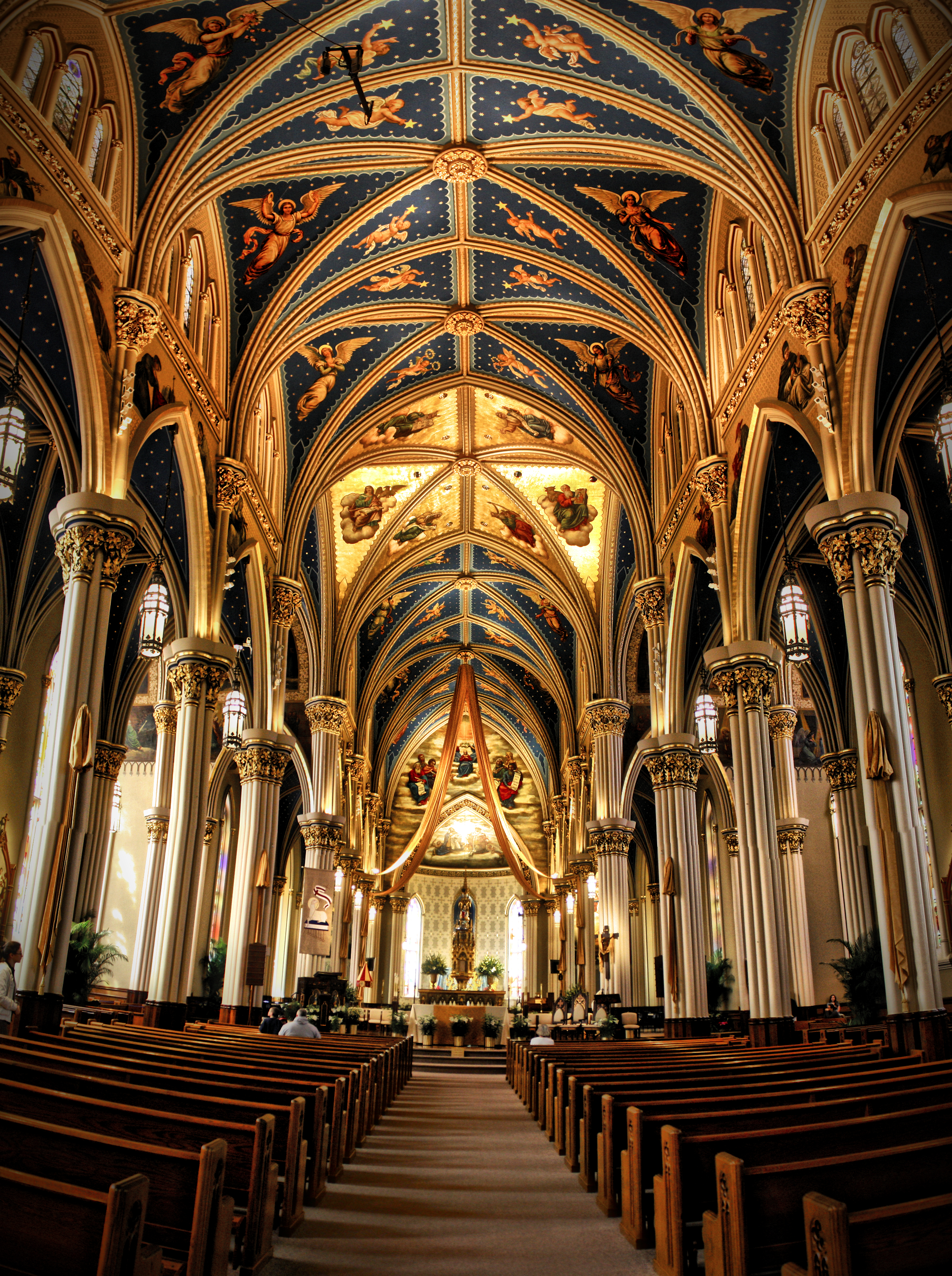
The Basilica of the Sacred Heart, completed in 1888

The movement toward a research university was championed subsequently by John W. Cavanaugh, who modernized educational standards and dedicated himself to the school's academic reputation and to increasing the number of students awarded bachelor's and master's degrees. As part of his efforts, he attracted many eminent scholars, established a chair in journalism, and introduced courses in chemical engineering. During his time as president, Notre Dame rapidly became a significant force on the football field. In 1917, Notre Dame awarded its first degree to a woman and its first bachelor's degree in 1922. However, female undergraduates were uncommon until 1972. James A. Burns became president in 1919 and following in the footsteps of Cavanaugh, he oversaw an academic revolution that brought the school up to national standards by adopting the elective system and moving away from the traditional scholastic and classical emphasis in three years. Notre Dame continued to grow, adding more colleges, programs, residence halls, and sports teams. By 1921, with the addition of the College of Commerce, Notre Dame had grown from a small college to a university with five colleges and a law school.

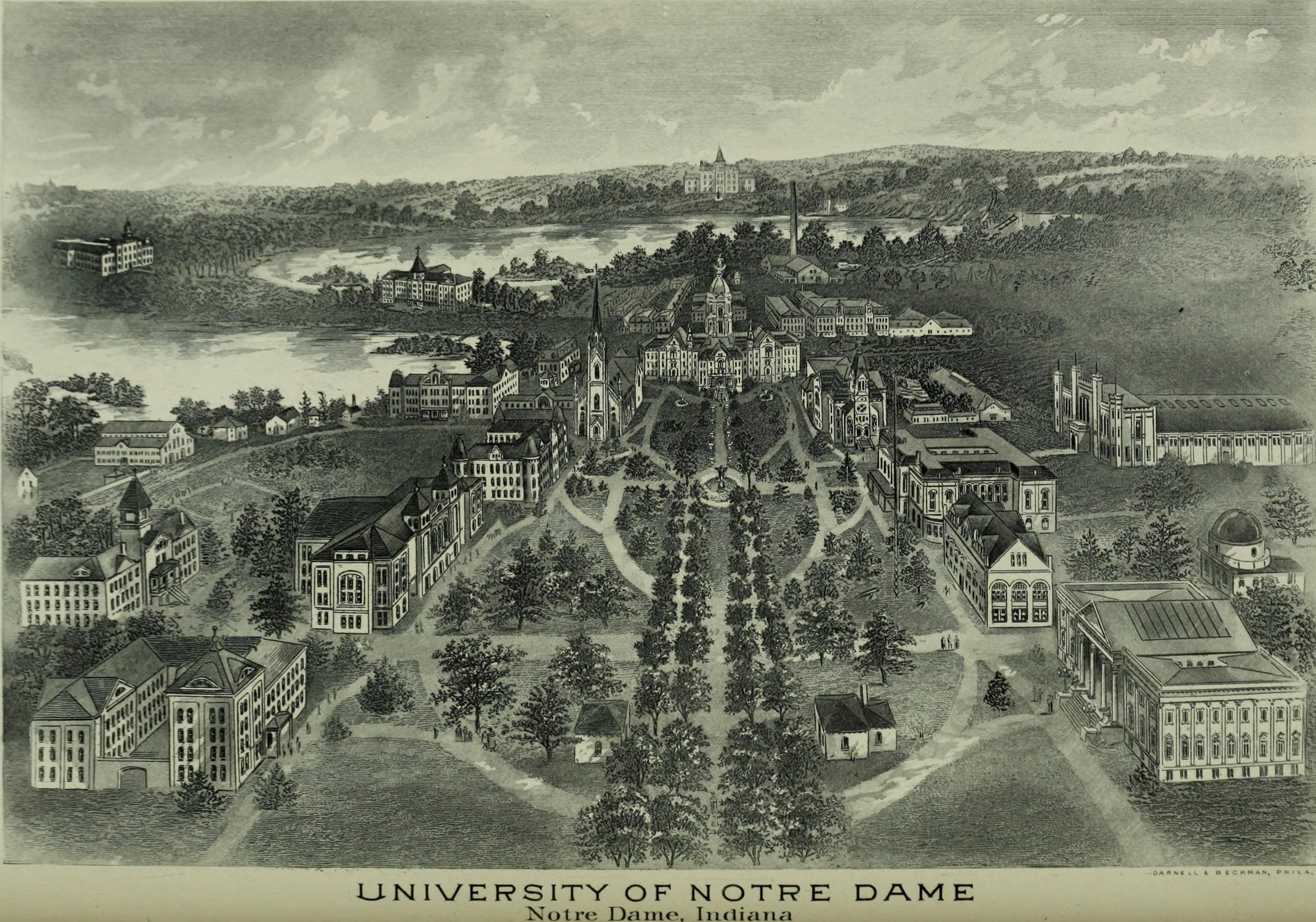
The University of Notre Dame in 1903

President Matthew Walsh (1922–1928) addressed the material needs of the university, particularly the $10,000 debt and the lack of space for new students. When he assumed the presidency, more than 1,100 students lived off campus while only 135 students paid for room and board. With fund-raising money, Walsh concentrated on the construction of a dormitory system. He built Freshman Hall in 1922, Sophomore Hall in 1923, and began construction of Morrissey, Howard and Lyons Halls between 1924 and 1925. By 1925, enrollment had increased to 2,500 students, of which 1,471 lived on campus; faculty members increased from 90 to 175. On the academic side, credit hours were reduced to encourage in-depth study, and Latin and Greek were no longer required. In 1928, three years of college were made a prerequisite for the study of law. Walsh expanded the College of Commerce, enlarged the stadium, completed South Dining Hall, and built the memorial and entrance transept of the Basilica.

One of the main driving forces in the university's growth was its football team, the Notre Dame Fighting Irish. Knute Rockne became head coach in 1918. Under him, the Irish won three national championships, had five undefeated seasons, won the Rose Bowl Game in 1925, and produced players such as George Gipp and the "Four Horsemen". Knute Rockne has the highest winning percentage (.881) in NCAA Division I/FBS football history. Rockne's offenses employed the Notre Dame Box and his defenses ran a 7–2–2 scheme.

The success of Notre Dame reflected the rising status of Irish Americans and Catholics in the 1920s. Catholics rallied around the team and listened to the games on the radio, especially when it defeated teams from schools that symbolized the Protestant establishment in the United States — Harvard, Yale, Princeton, and Army. Its role as a high-profile flagship institution of Catholicism made it an easy target of anti-Catholicism. The most remarkable episode of violence was a clash in 1924 between Notre Dame students and the Ku Klux Klan (KKK), a white supremacist and anti-Catholic movement. The Klan decided to hold a week-long Klavern in South Bend. Clashes with the student body started on May 17 when students blocked the Klansmen from descending from their trains in the South Bend station and ripped KKK clothes and regalia. Two days later, thousands of students massed downtown protesting the Klavern, and only the arrival of college president Walsh prevented any further clashes. The next day, Rockne spoke at a campus rally and implored the students to refrain from further violence. A few days later, the Klavern broke up, but the hostility shown by the students contributed to the downfall of the KKK in Indiana.

=== Expansion in the 1930s and 1940s ===
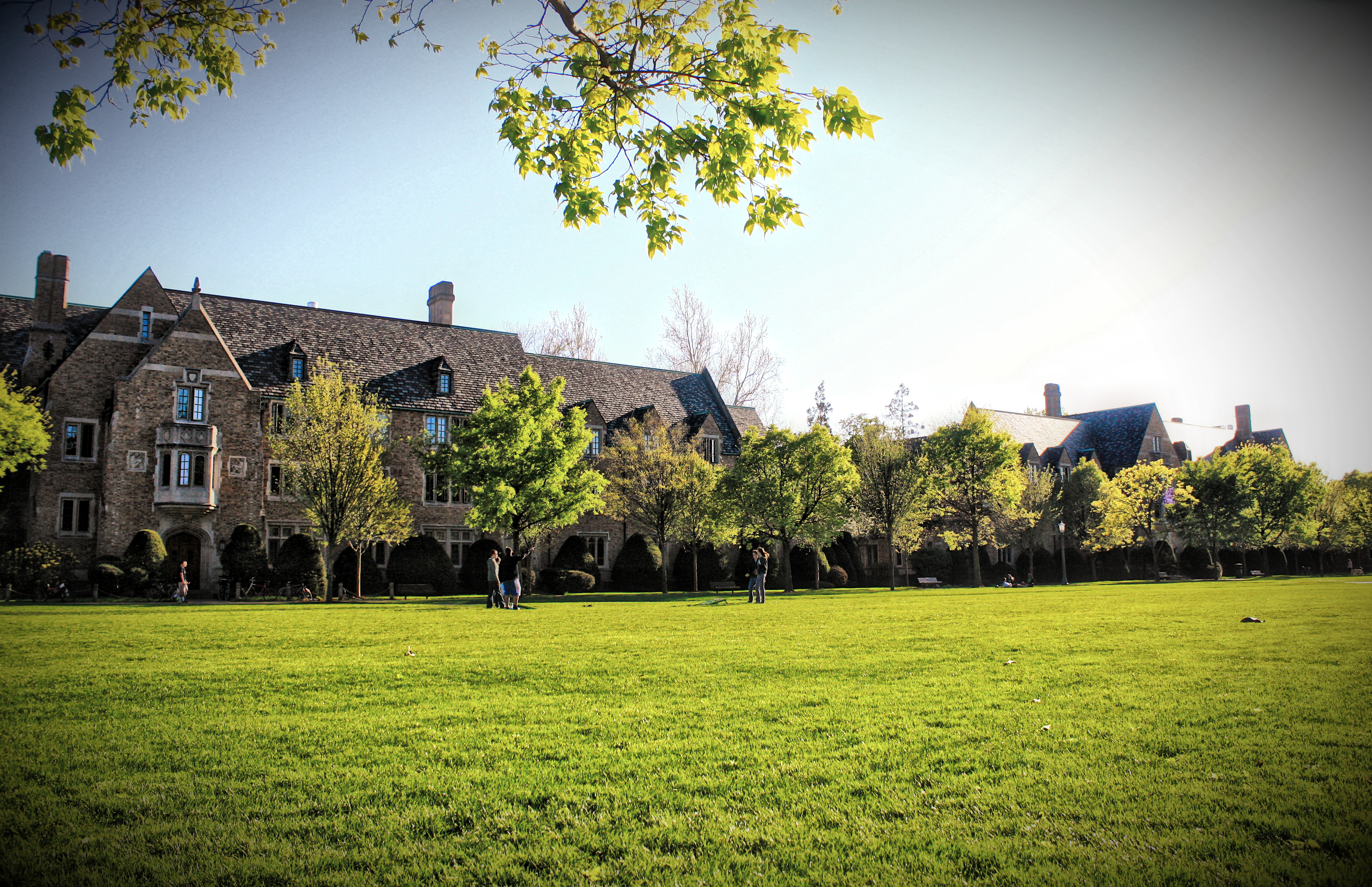
South Quad, built in the 1920s–1940s, includes many residential halls

Charles L. O'Donnell (1928–1934) and John Francis O'Hara (1934–1939) fueled both material and academic expansion. During their tenures at Notre Dame, they brought many refugees and intellectuals to campus, such as W. B. Yeats, Frank H. Spearman, Jeremiah D. M. Ford, Irvin Abell, and Josephine Brownson for the Laetare Medal, instituted in 1883. O'Hara also concentrated on expanding the graduate school. New construction included Notre Dame Stadium, the law school building, the Rockne Memorial, numerous residential halls, the Cushing Hall of Engineering, and a new heating plant. This rapid expansion, which cost the university more than $2.8 million, was made possible in large part through football revenues. O'Hara strongly believed that the Fighting Irish football team could be an effective means to "acquaint the public with the ideals that dominate" Notre Dame. He wrote, "Notre Dame football is a spiritual service because it is played for the honor and glory of God and of his Blessed Mother. When St. Paul said: 'Whether you eat or drink, or whatsoever else you do, do all for the glory of God,' he included football."

During World War II, O'Donnell offered Notre Dame's facilities to the armed forces. The Navy accepted his offer and installed Naval Reserve Officers' Training Corps (ROTC) units on campus as part of the V-12 Navy College Training Program. Soon after the installation, there were only a few hundred civilian students at Notre Dame. O'Donnell continued O'Hara's work with the graduate school. He formalized the graduate program further and replaced the previous committee of graduate studies with a dean.

John J. Cavanaugh, president from 1946 to 1952, devoted his efforts to raising academic standards and reshaping the university administration to serve better its educational mission and an expanded student body. He stressed advanced studies and research while quadrupling the university's student population, with undergraduate enrollment increasing by more than half and graduate student enrollment growing fivefold. Cavanaugh established the Lobund Institute for Animal Studies and Notre Dame's Medieval Institute, presided over the construction of Nieuwland Science Hall, Fisher Hall, and the Morris Inn, and the Hall of Liberal Arts (now O'Shaughnessy Hall), made possible by a donation from I. A. O'Shaughnessy, at the time the largest ever made to an American Catholic university. He also established the university's system of advisory councils.

=== Hesburgh era: 1952–1987 ===
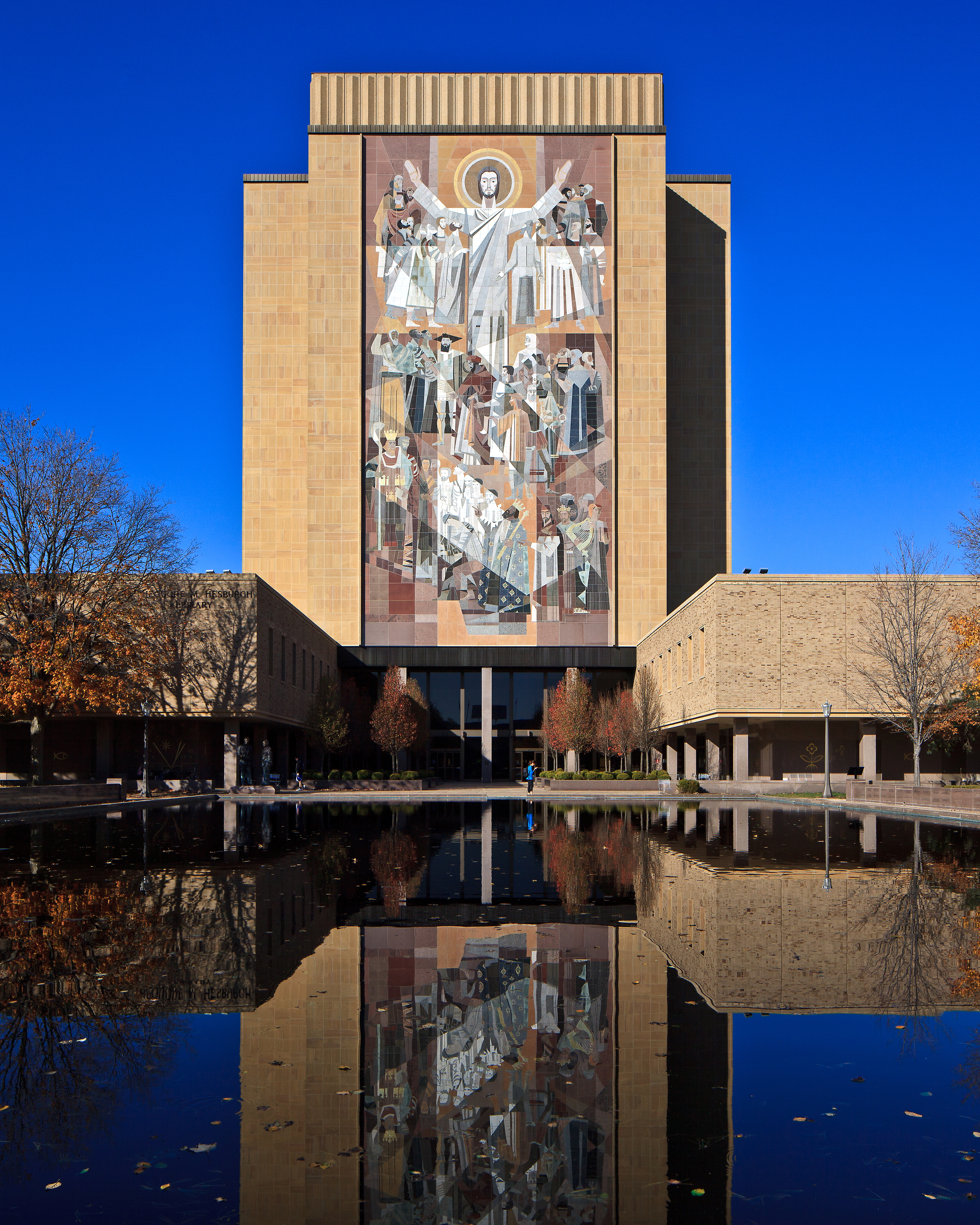
The Hesburgh Library, decorated by the Word of Life mural.

Theodore Hesburgh served as president for 35 years (1952–1987). Under his presidency, Notre Dame underwent huge growth and transformation from a school mostly known for its football to a top-tier university, academic powerhouse, and preeminent Catholic university. The annual operating budget rose by a factor of 18, from $9.7 million to $176.6 million; the endowment by a factor of 40, from $9 million to $350 million; and research funding by a factor of 20, from $735,000 to $15 million. Enrollment nearly doubled from 4,979 to 9,600; faculty more than doubled from 389 to 950, and degrees awarded annually doubled from 1,212 to 2,500.

Hesburgh made Notre Dame coeducational. Women had graduated every year since 1917, but they were mostly religious sisters in graduate programs. In the mid-1960s, Notre Dame and Saint Mary's College developed a co-exchange program whereby several hundred students took classes not offered at their home institution. After extensive debate, merging with St. Mary's was rejected, primarily because of the different faculty qualifications and pay scales. "In American college education," explained Charles E. Sheedy, Notre Dame's dean of Arts and Letters, "certain features formerly considered advantageous and enviable are now seen as anachronistic and out of place. ... In this environment of diversity, the integration of the sexes is a normal and expected aspect, replacing separatism." Two of the residence halls were converted for the newly admitted female students that first year, with two more converted the next school year. In 1971, Mary Ann Proctor, a transfer from St. Mary's, became the first female undergraduate. The following year, Mary Davey Bliley became the first woman to graduate from the university with a bachelor's degree in marketing. In 1978, a historic district comprising 21 contributing buildings was listed on the National Register of Historic Places.

=== Recent history ===
In the eighteen years Edward Malloy was president, the school's reputation, faculty, and resources grew rapidly. He added more than 500 professors and the academic quality of the student body improved dramatically, with the average Scholastic Assessment Test (SAT) score rising from 1240 to 1460. The number of minority students more than doubled, the endowment grew from $350 million to more than $3 billion, the annual operating budget rose from $177 million to more than $650 million, and annual research funding improved from $15 million to more than $70 million. Notre Dame's most recent (2014) capital campaign raised $2.014 billion, far exceeding its goal of $767 million. It was the largest in the history of Catholic higher education, and the largest of any university without a medical school at the time.

John I. Jenkins took over from Malloy in 2005. In his inaugural address, Jenkins described his goals of making the university a leader in research that recognizes ethics and builds the connection between faith and studies. During his tenure, Notre Dame has increased its endowment, enlarged its student body, and undergone many construction projects on campus, including the Compton Family Ice Arena, a new architecture hall, and additional residence halls. Announced as an integration of "the academy, student life and athletics," construction on the 750,000 sq ft (70,000 m^{2}) Campus Crossroads project began around Notre Dame Stadium in November 2014. Its three buildings house student life services, an indoor gym, a recreation center, the career center, a 500-seat student ballroom, the departments of anthropology and psychology, a digital media center and the department of music and sacred music program.

Jenkins announced the 2023–2024 academic year would be his last as president in October 2023. The board of trustees subsequently elected Robert A. Dowd to succeed him, effective June 1, 2024.

== Campus ==
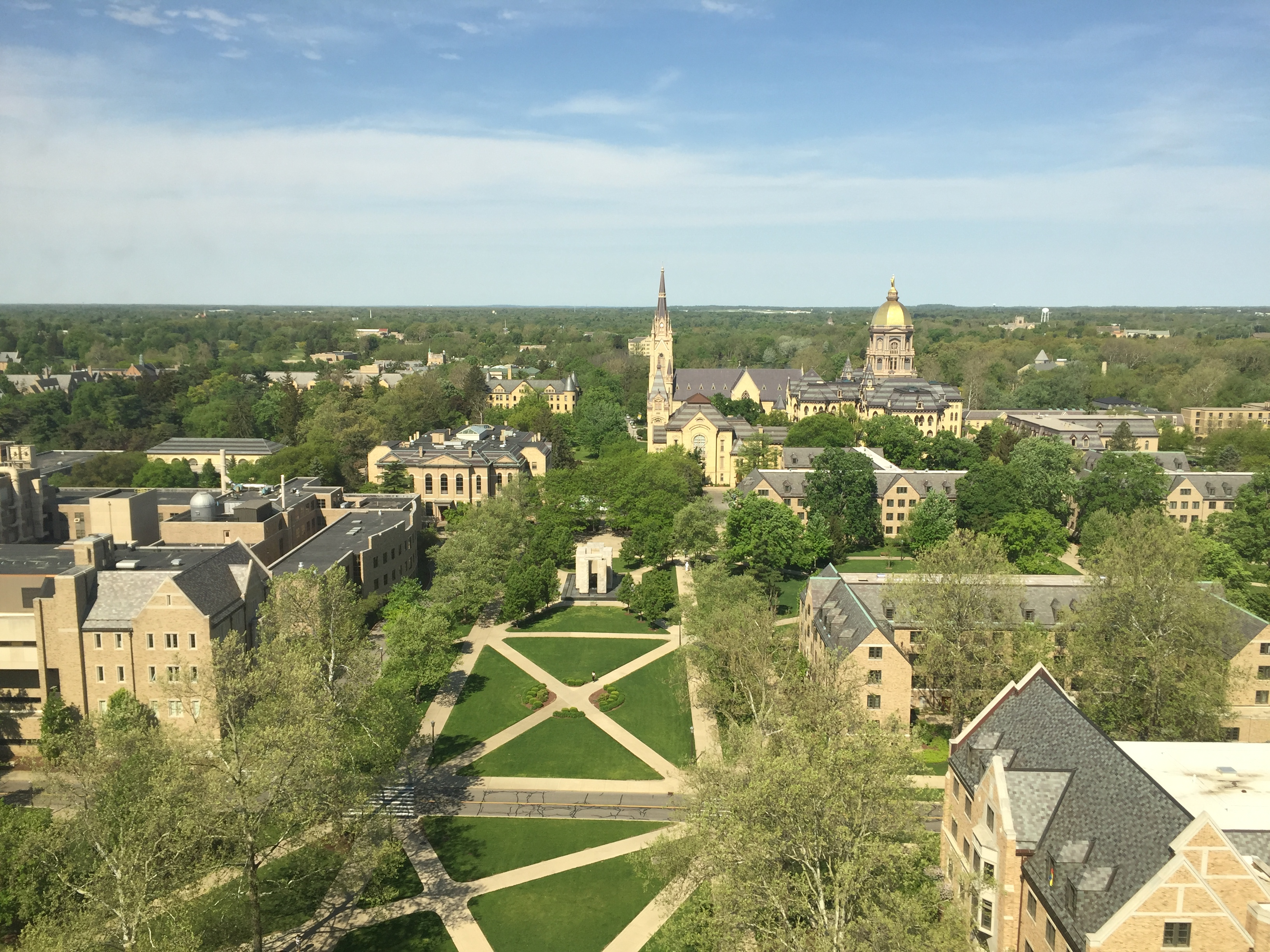
A view of the historical part of the campus, with the Basilica and Main Building

Notre Dame's campus is located in Notre Dame, Indiana, in the Michiana area of Northern Indiana. It lies on 1,250 acres (510 ha), south of the Indiana Toll Road and includes around 170 buildings and athletic fields located around its two lakes and seven quadrangles.

- University of Notre Dame: Main and South Quadrangles
- U.S. National Register of Historic Places
- U.S. Historic district
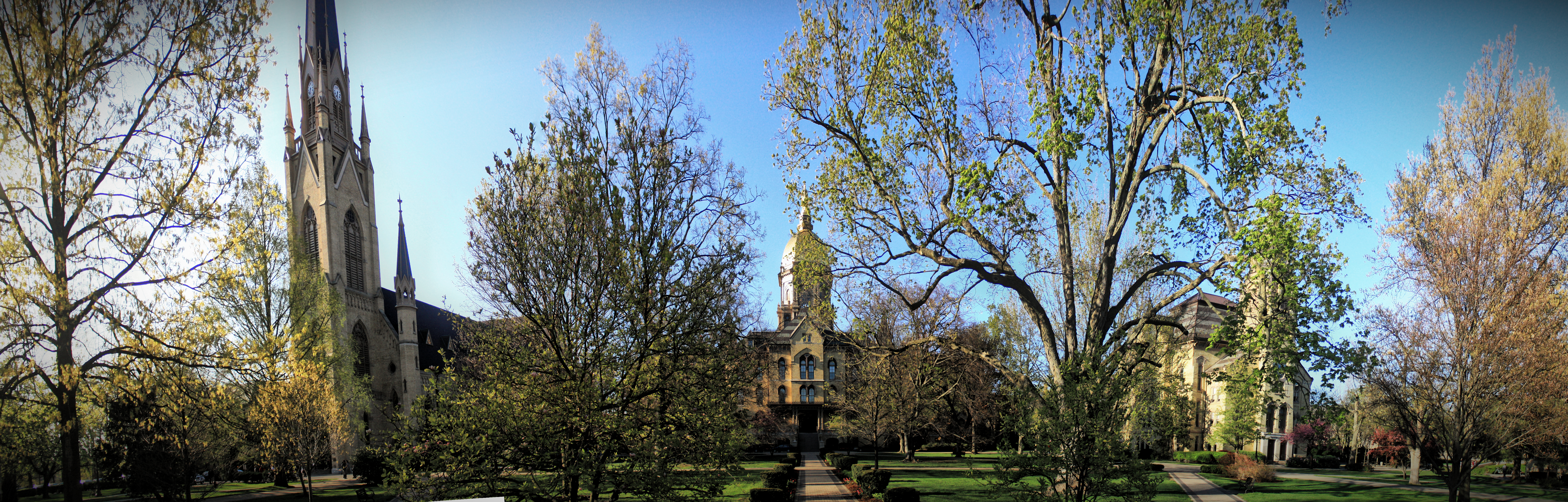
- The University's historic center, comprising the Basilica, the Golden Dome, and Washington Hall, was built in the early years of the university.
- Location: Off I-80/90, Notre Dame, Indiana
- Area: 70 acres (28 ha)
- Built: 1842
- Architectural style: Mixed (more than two styles from different periods)
- NRHP reference No.: 78000053
- Added to NRHP: May 23, 1978

It is consistently ranked as one of the most beautiful university campuses in the United States and around the world, and it is noted particularly for the Golden Dome, the Basilica and its stained glass windows, the quads and the greenery, the Grotto, the Hesburgh Library with its Word of Life stone mural (nicknamed "Touchdown Jesus" by students), and its statues and museums. Notre Dame is a major tourist attraction in northern Indiana; in the 2015–2016 academic year, more than 1.8 million visitors, almost half of whom were from outside St. Joseph County, visited the campus.

A 116-acre (47 ha) historic district was listed on the National Register of Historic Places in 1978 as University of Notre Dame: Main and South Quadrangles. The district includes 21 contributing buildings in the core of the original campus such as the Main Administration Building and the Basilica.

=== Administration and academic buildings ===
The Main Building serves as the center for the university's administrative offices, including the Office of the president. Its golden dome, topped by the statue of Mary, is the campus' most recognizable landmark. The main building is located on Main Quad (also known as "God Quad"), which is the oldest, most historic, and most central part of campus. Behind the main building stands several facilities with administrative purposes and student services, including Carole Sadner Hall, Brownson Hall, and St. Liam's Hall, the campus health center.

There are several religious buildings. The current Basilica of the Sacred Heart is on the site of Sorin's original church, which had become too small for the growing college. It is built in French Revival style, with stained glass windows imported from France. Luigi Gregori, an Italian painter invited by Sorin to be an artist in residence, painted the interior. The basilica also features a bell tower with a carillon. Inside the church, there are sculptures by Ivan Meštrović. The Grotto of Our Lady of Lourdes, built in 1896, is a replica of the original in Lourdes and is a popular spot for prayer and meditation. The Old College building has become one of two seminaries on the campus run by the Congregation of Holy Cross.

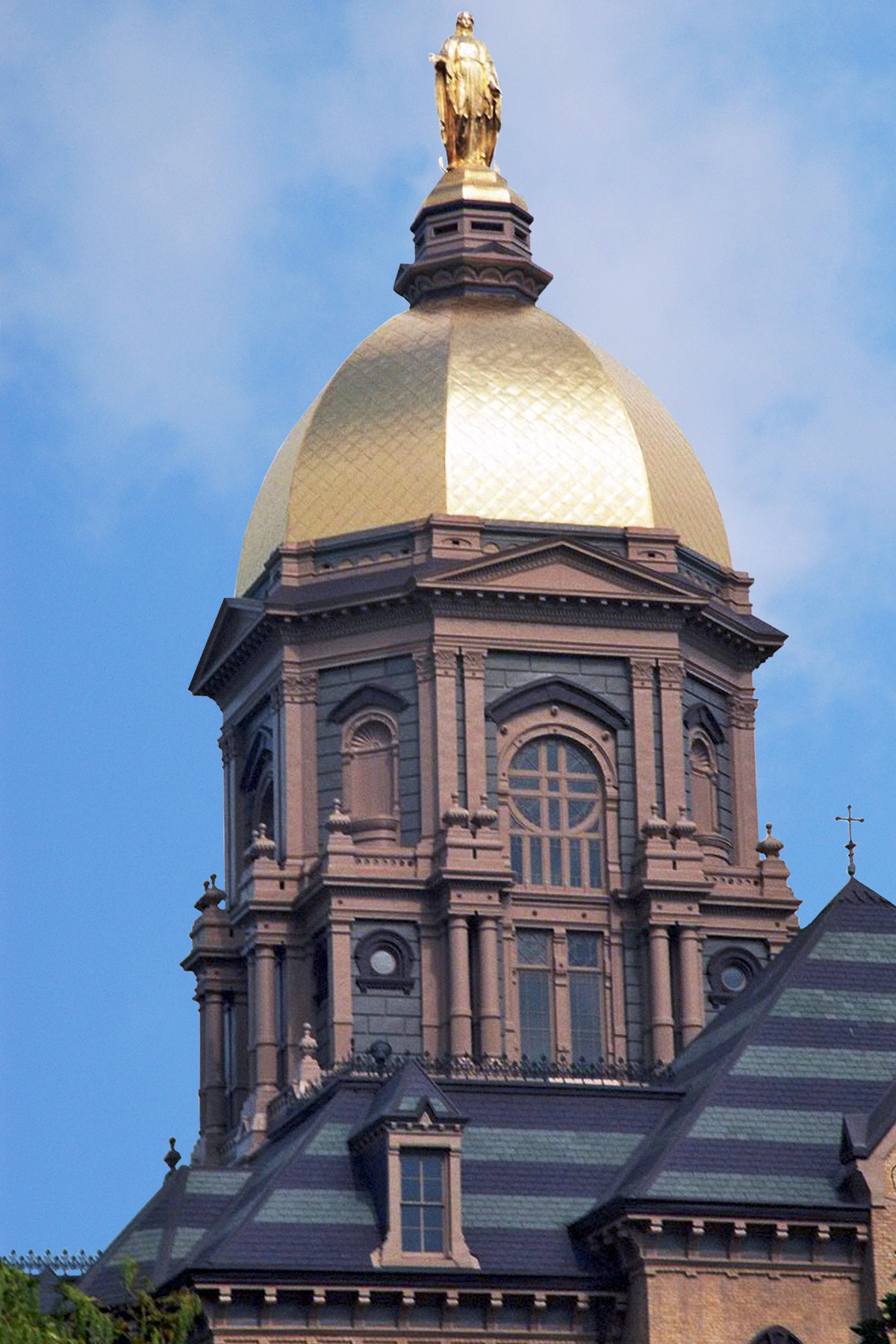
The Golden Dome, built under Sorin, has become the symbol of the university

Academic buildings are concentrated in the Center-South and Center-East sections of campus. McCourtney Hall, an interdisciplinary research facility, opened its doors for the fall 2016 semester, and ground was broken on the 60,000 sq ft (5,600 m^{2}) Walsh Family Hall of Architecture on the south end of campus near the DeBartolo Performing Arts Center which opened in fall 2018. Since 2004, several buildings have been added, including the DeBartolo Performing Arts Center, the Guglielmino Complex, and the Jordan Hall of Science. A new engineering building, Stinson-Remick Hall, a new combination Center for Social Concerns/Institute for Church Life building, Geddes Hall, and a law school addition were completed at the same time. Many academic buildings were built with a system of libraries, the most prominent of which is the Hesburgh Library, built in 1963 and today containing almost four million books. The Stayer Center for Executive Education, which houses the Mendoza College of Business Executive Education Department, opened in March 2013, just south of the Mendoza College of Business building.

=== Residential and student buildings ===
There are 33 single-sex undergraduate residence halls. The university has recently announced a co-educational undergraduate dorm community based in one of the graduate residential apartments. Most of the graduate students on campus live in one of four graduate housing complexes on campus. A new residence for men, Baumer Hall, was built in 2019. Johnson Family Hall, for women, was also completed and opened that semester. The South Dining Hall and North Dining Hall serve the student body.

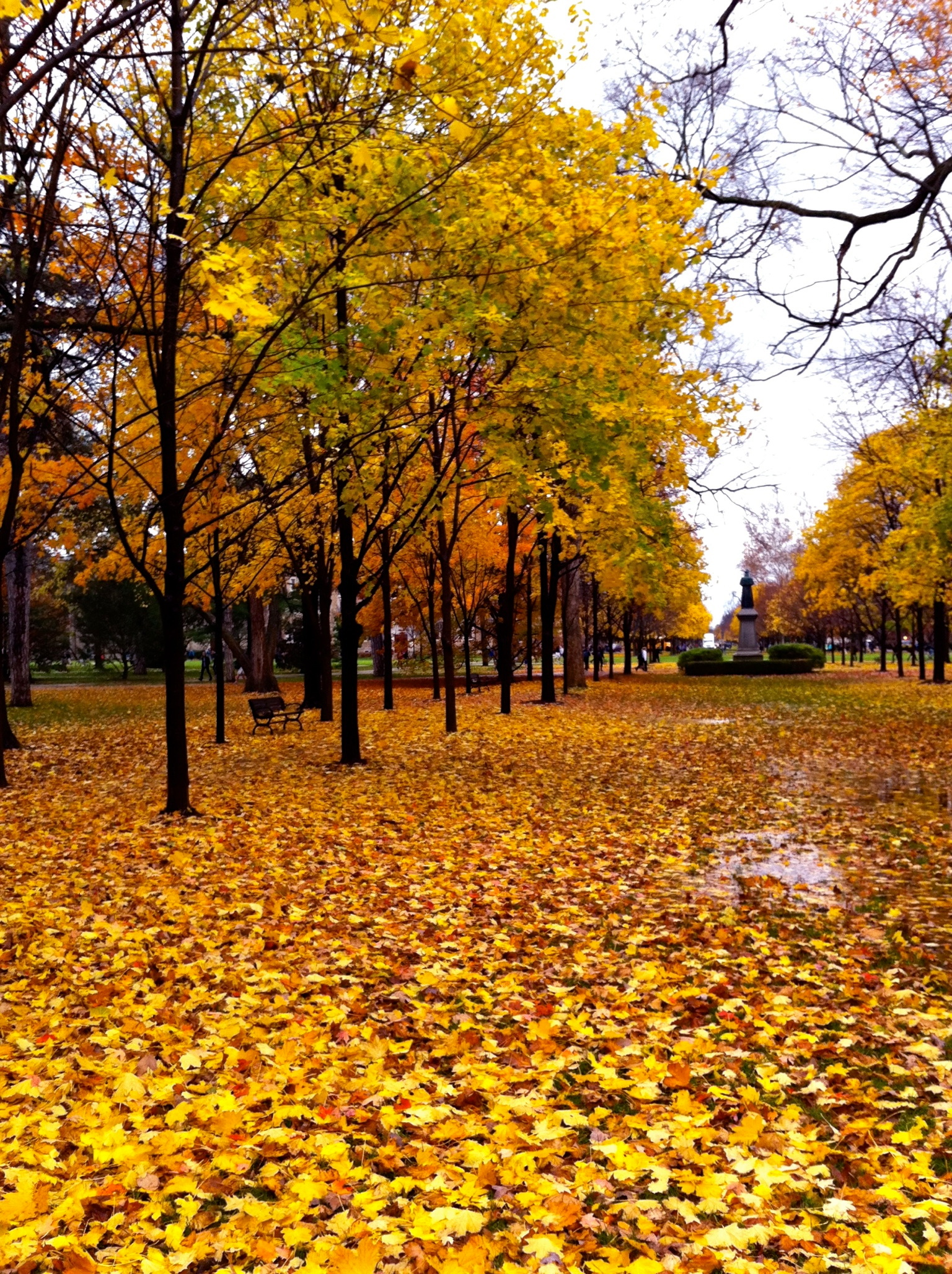
Fall on the Main Quadrangle

The campus hosts several entertainment, general purpose, and common spaces. LaFortune Student Center, commonly known as "LaFortune" or "LaFun," is a four-story building built in 1883 that serves the student union and hosts social, recreational, cultural, and educational activities. LaFortune hosts many businesses (including restaurant chains), student services, and divisions of The Office of Student Affairs. A second student union came with the addition of Duncan Student Center, which is built onto the Notre Dame Stadium as part of the Campus Crossroads projects. As well as additional food service chains, recreation facilities, and student offices, Duncan also hosts a student gym and a ballroom.

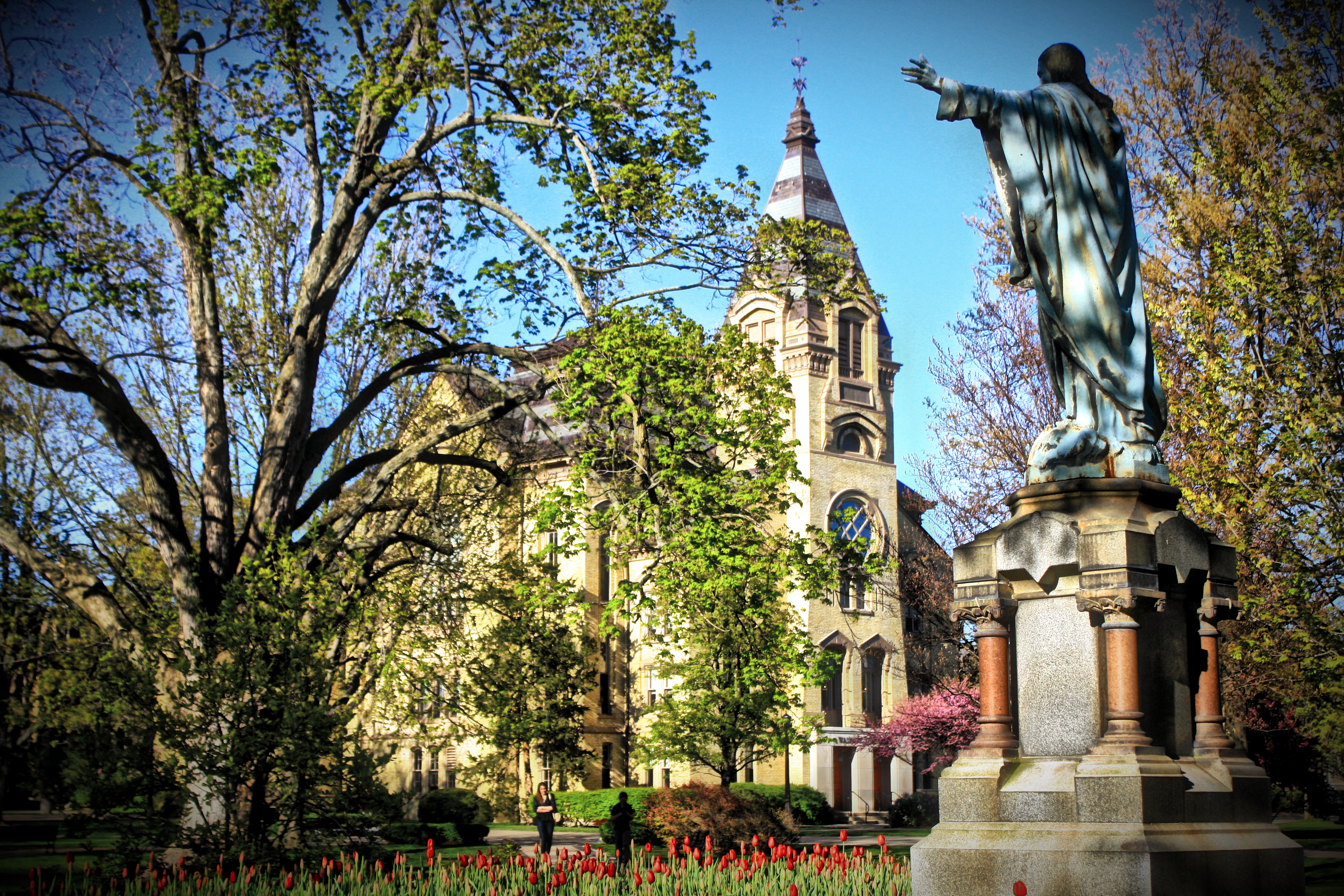
Historic Washington Hall on the Main Quadrangle, popularly termed the "God Quad"

=== Athletics facilities ===
Because of its long athletic tradition, the university features many athletic buildings, which are concentrated in the southern and eastern sections of campus. The most prominent is Notre Dame Stadium, home of the Fighting Irish football team; it has been renovated several times and today can seat over 80,000 people. Prominent venues include the Edmund P. Joyce Center, with indoor basketball and volleyball courts, and the Compton Family Ice Arena, a two-rink facility dedicated to hockey. There are many outdoor fields, such as the Frank Eck Stadium for baseball.

Legends of Notre Dame (commonly called Legends) is a music venue, public house, and restaurant on campus, just 100 yd (91 m) south of the stadium. The former Alumni Senior Club opened in September 2003 after a $3.5 million renovation and became an all-ages student hang-out. Legends is made up of two parts: The Restaurant and Alehouse and the nightclub.

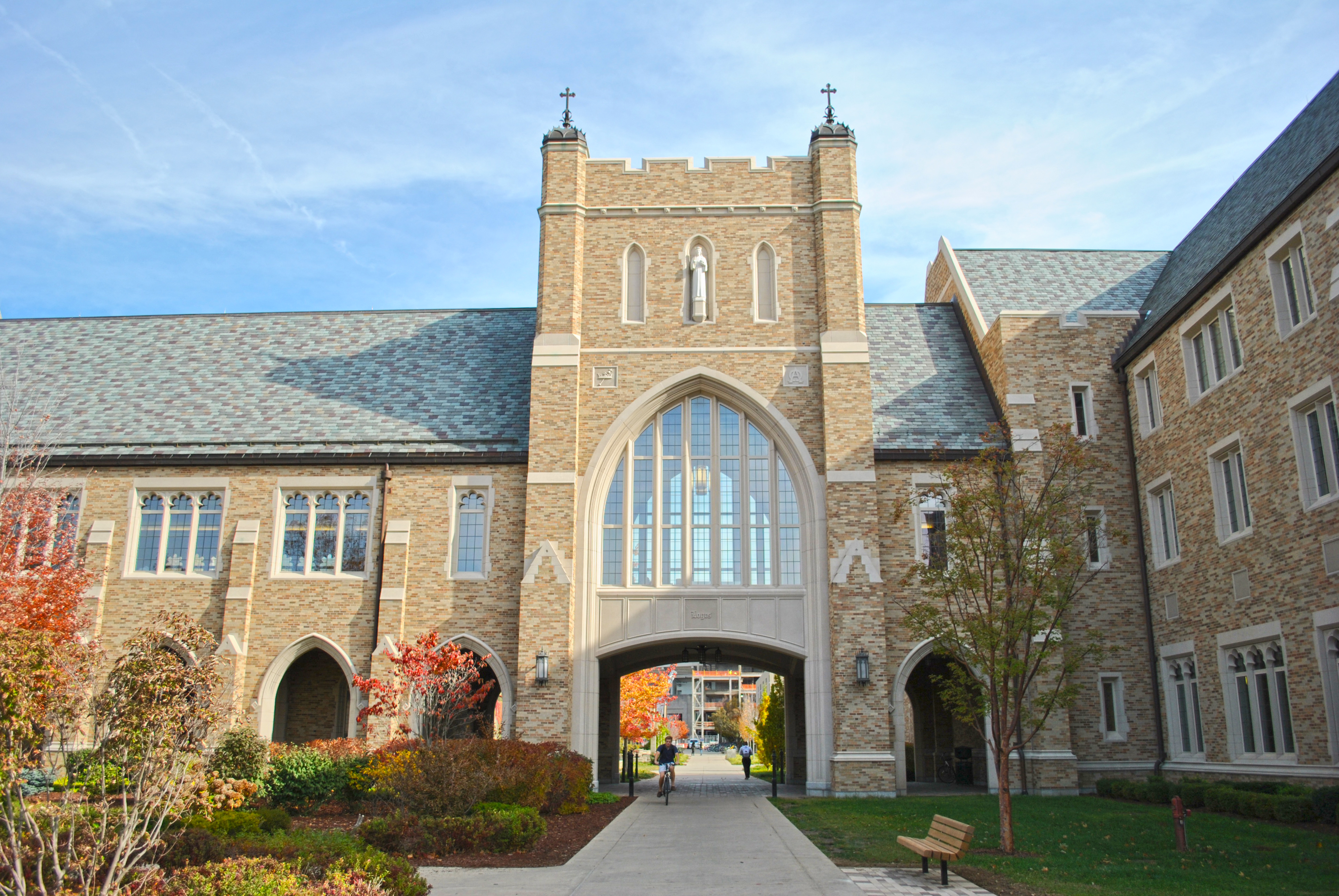
The new wing of the Law School

=== Environmental sustainability ===
The Office of Sustainability was created in the fall of 2007 at the recommendation of a Sustainability Strategy Working Group and appointed the first director in April 2008. The pursuit of sustainability is related directly to the Catholic mission of the university. Other resources and centers on campus focusing on sustainability include the Environmental Change Initiative, Environmental Research Center, and the Center for Sustainable Energy at Notre Dame. The university also houses the Kellogg Institute for International Peace Studies.

Notre Dame received a gold rating from the Association for the Advancement of Sustainability in Higher Education (AASHE) in 2014, though in 2017 it was downgraded to silver. In 2016, the Office of Sustainability released its Comprehensive Sustainability Strategy to achieve its goals in a wide area of university operations. As of November 2020, 17 buildings have achieved LEED-Certified status, with 12 of them earning Gold certification. Notre Dame's dining service sources 40 percent of its food locally and offers sustainably caught seafood and many organic, fair-trade, and vegan options. In 2019, irrigation systems' improvements led to 244 million fewer gallons of water being used and a 50 percent reduction in water consumption over 10 years.

In 2015, Notre Dame announced major environmental sustainability goals, including eliminating using coal by 2020 and reducing its carbon footprint by half by 2030. Both these goals were reached in early 2019. This was achieved by implementing energy conservation, energy efficiency strategies, temperature setpoints, low-flow water devices, and diversifying its energy sources and infrastructures. New sources of renewable energy on campus include geothermal wells on East Quad and by the Notre Dame Stadium, substitution of boilers with gas turbines, solar panels on Fitzpatrick Hall and Stinson-Remick Hall and off-campus, a hydroelectric facility at Seitz Park in South Bend powered by the St. Joseph River, and heat recovery strategies. Future projects outlined by the university's utilities long-range plan include continual diversification of its energy portfolio, future geothermal wells in new buildings and some existing facilities, and a collaboration with the South Bend Solar Project. Current goals include cutting Notre Dame's carbon footprint by 83 percent by 2050 and eventually becoming carbon neutral, diverting 67 percent of all waste from landfills by 2030.

=== Global Gateways ===
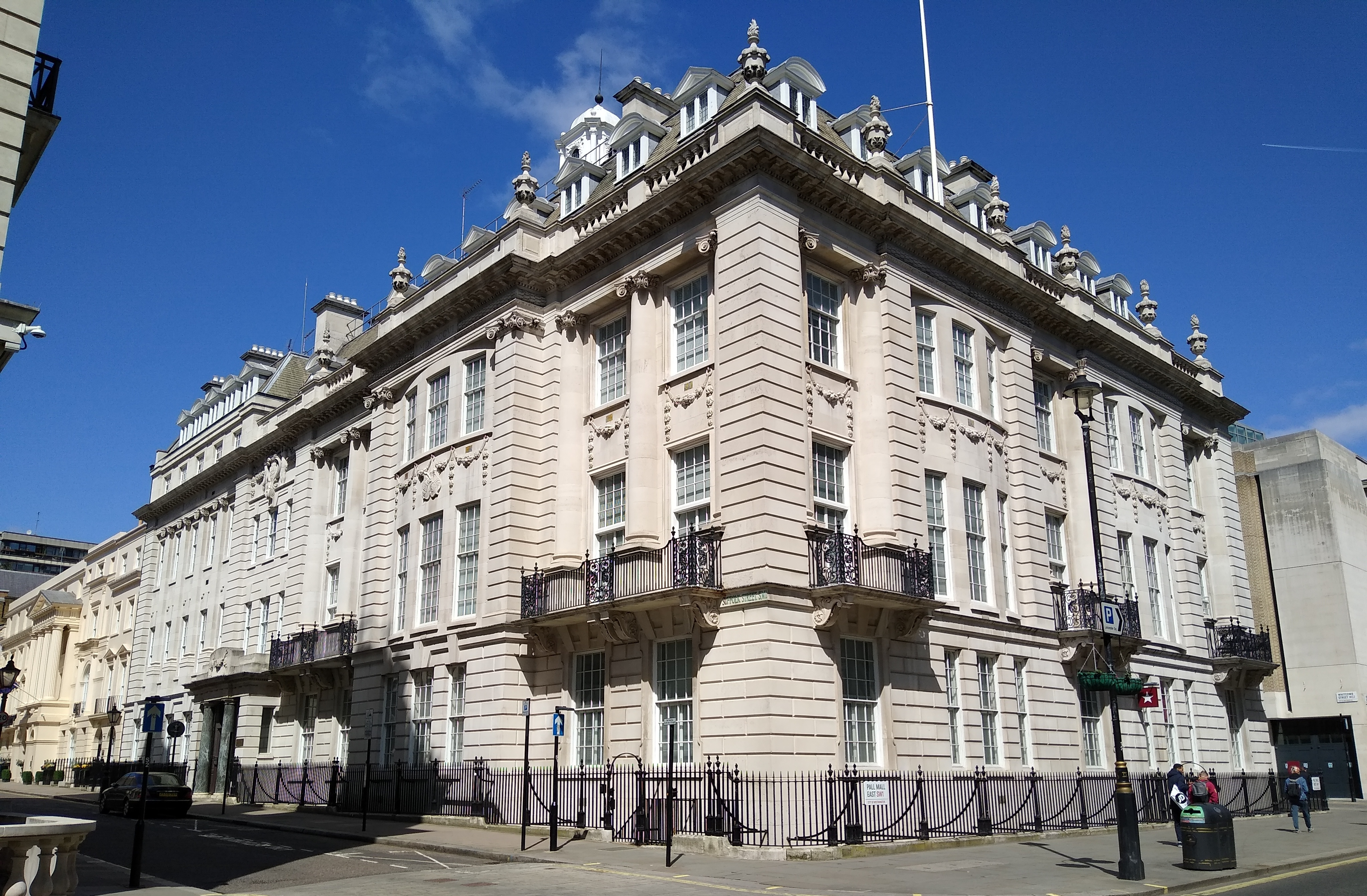
The former United University Club

The university owns several centers around the world used for international studies and research, conferences abroad, and alumni support.

- London. The university has had a presence in London since 1968. Since 1998, its London center has been based in Fischer Hall, the former United University Club in Trafalgar Square. The center hosts the university's programs in the city, and conferences and symposia. The university also owns a residence facility, Conway Hall, for students studying abroad.
- Beijing. The university owns space in the Liangmaqiao Station area. The center is the hub of Notre Dame Asia. It hosts a number of programs including study abroad.

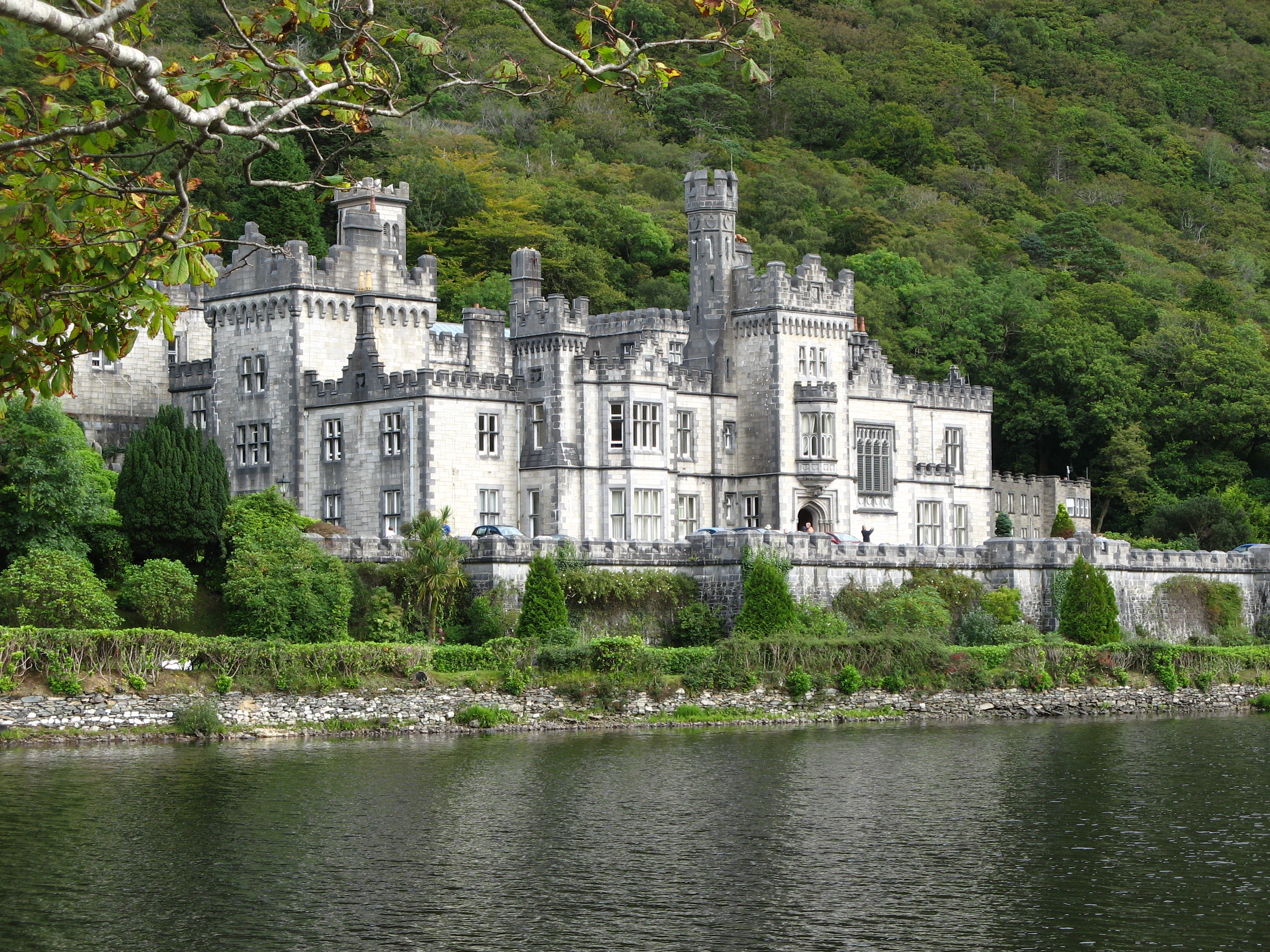
Kylemore Abbey

- Dublin. The university owns the O'Connell House, a building in Merrion Square in the heart of Georgian Dublin. It hosts academic programs and summer internships in Irish studies for both undergraduate and graduate students in addition to seminars, and is home to the Keough Naughton Centre. Since 2015, the university has partnered with Kylemore Abbey, renovating spaces in the abbey so it could host academic programs.
- Jerusalem. The Jerusalem Global Gateway shares space with the university's Tantur Ecumenical Institute, in a 100,000 sq ft (9,300 m^{2}) facility on the seam between Jerusalem and Bethlehem. It hosts religious and ecumenical programs.
- Rome. The Rome Global Gateway is on Via Ostilia, very close to the Colosseum. It was recently acquired and renovated and now has 32,000 sq ft (3,000 m^{2}) of space to host a variety of academic activities. The university purchased a second Roman villa on the Caelian hill.

In addition to the five Global Gateways, the university also owns the Santa Fe Building in Chicago, where it offers its executive Master of Business Administration program. The university also hosts Global Centers located in Santiago, São Paulo, Mexico City, Hong Kong, and Mumbai.

=== Community development ===
The first phase of Eddy Street Commons, a $215 million development adjacent to campus funded by the university, broke ground in June 2008. The project drew union protests when workers hired by the City of South Bend to construct the public parking garage picketed the private work site after a contractor hired non-union workers. The $90 million second phase broke ground in 2017.

Campus of the University of Notre Dame
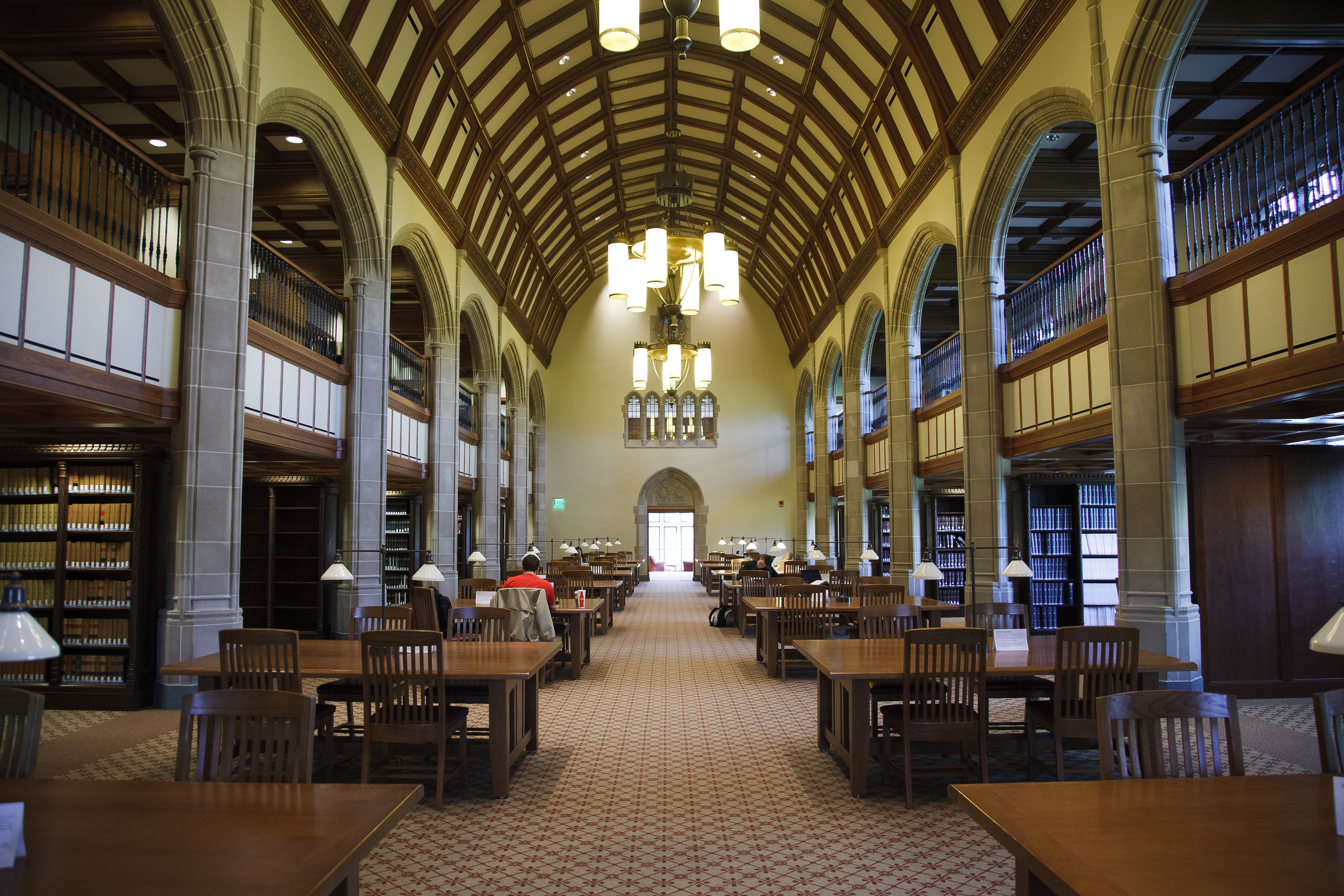
The central area of the Kresge Law Library

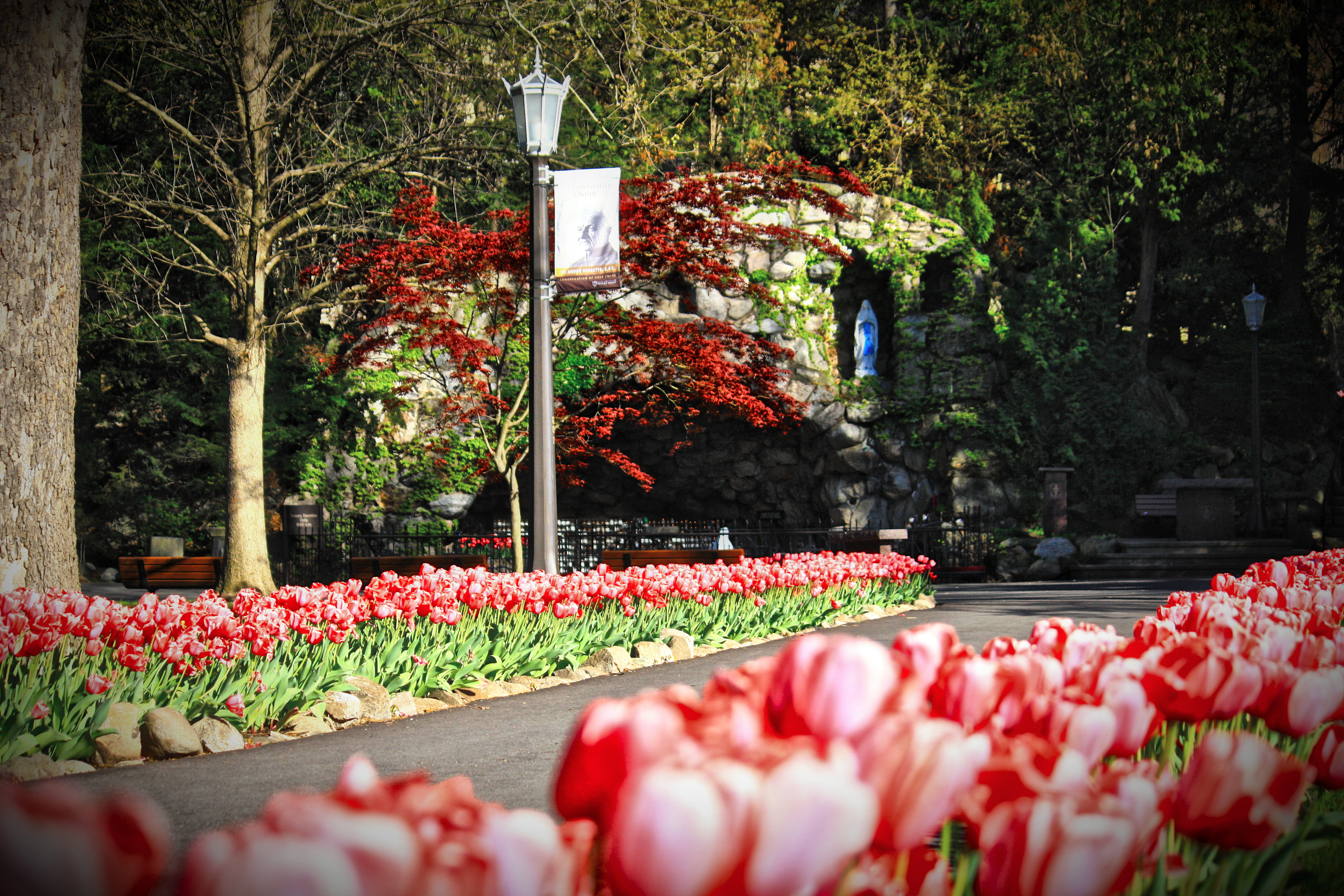
University of Notre Dame's replica of the Grotto at Lourdes

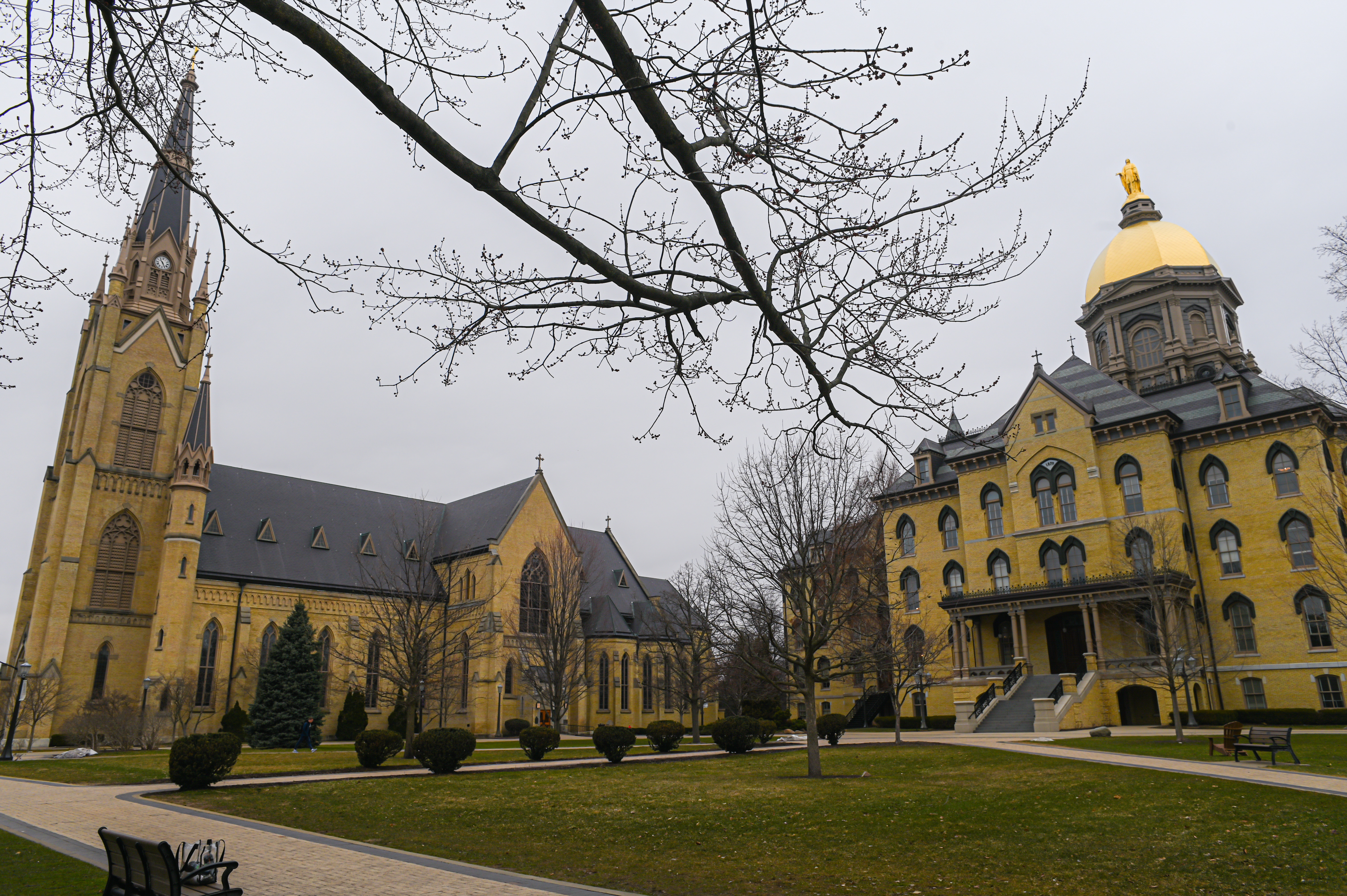
Basilica and Dome

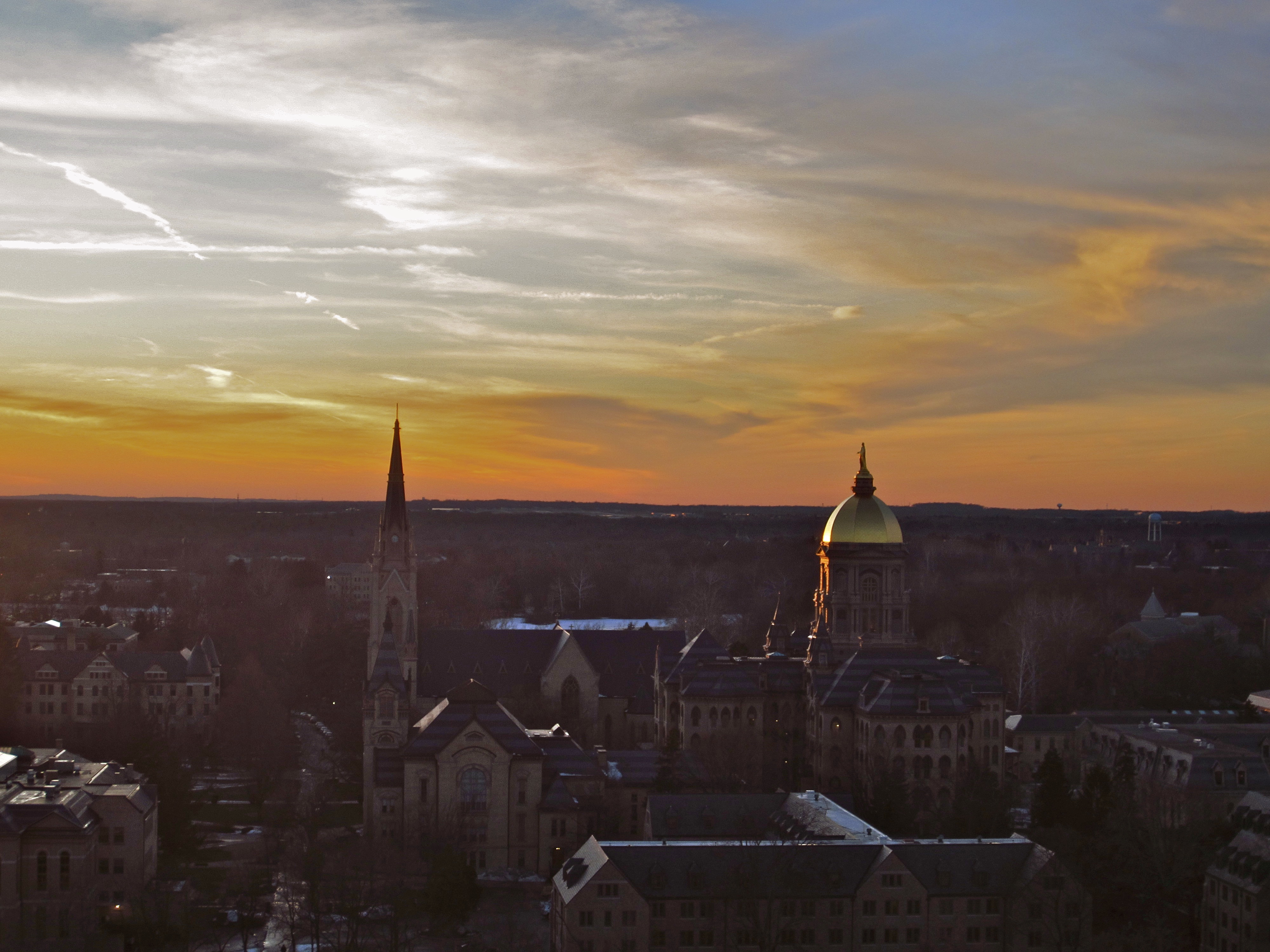
University of Notre Dame: Main and South Quadrangles

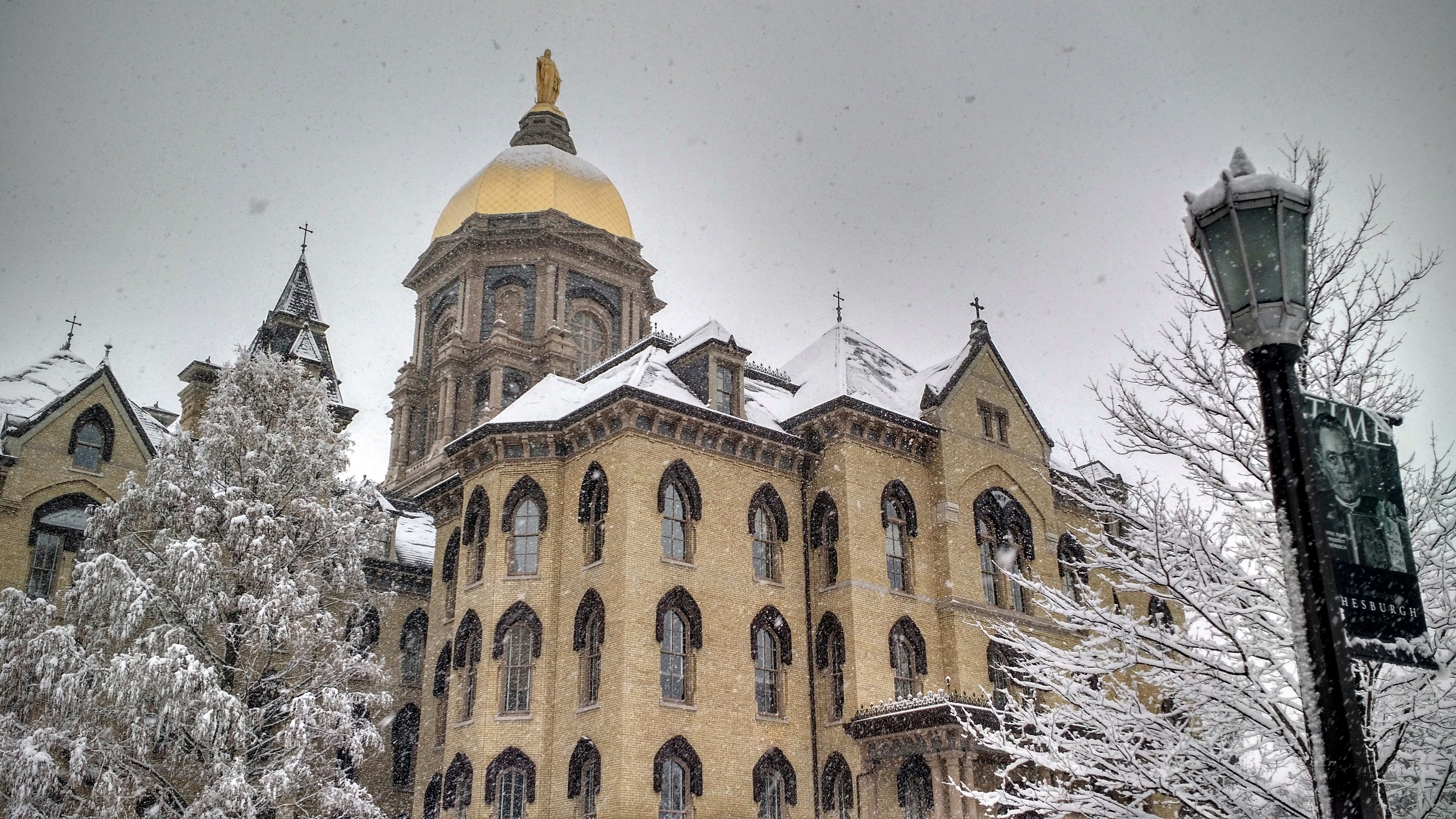
The Golden Dome in the Winter

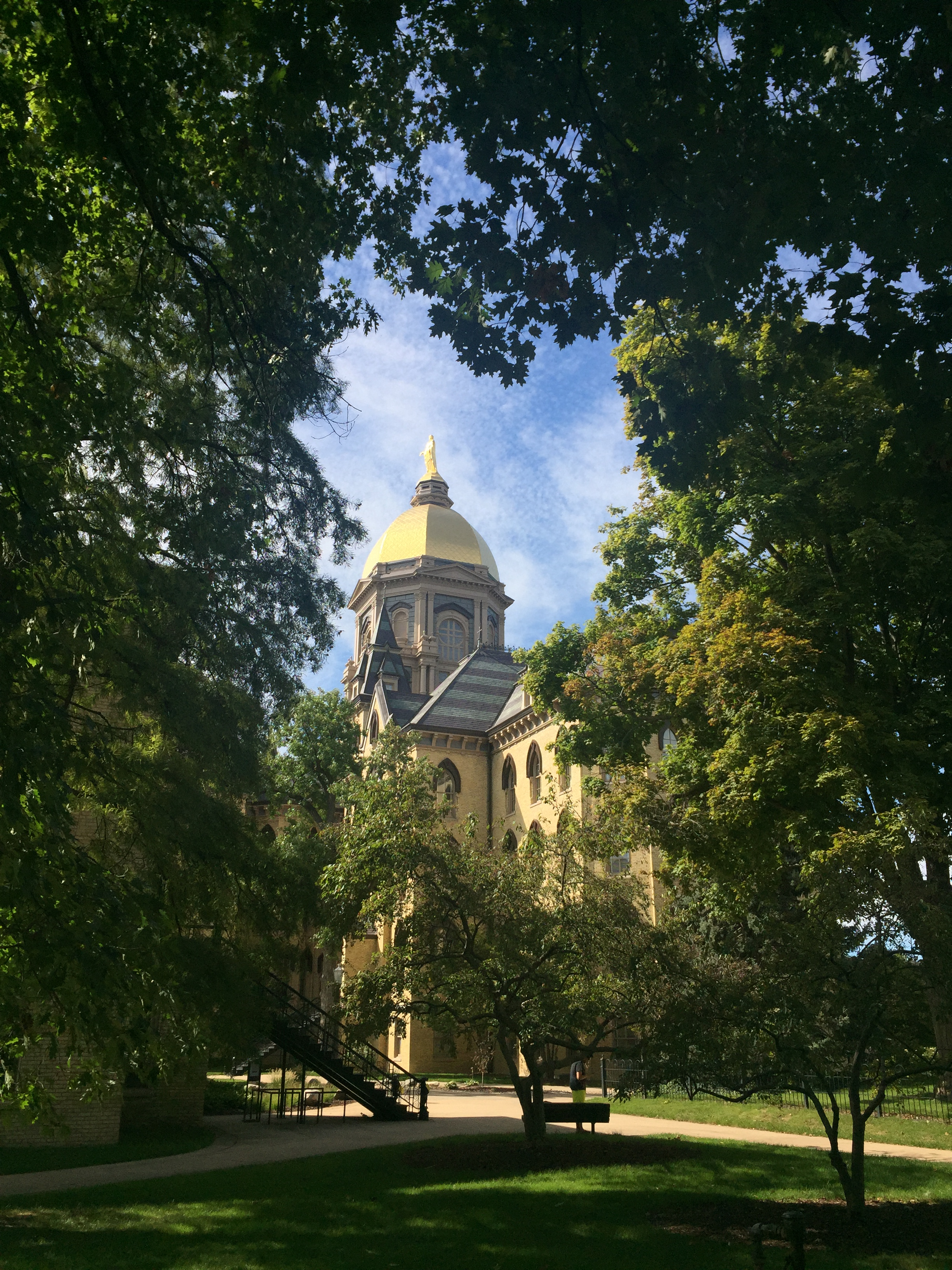
Notre Dame Golden Dome from West Entrance of Cavanaugh Hall

== Organization and administration ==
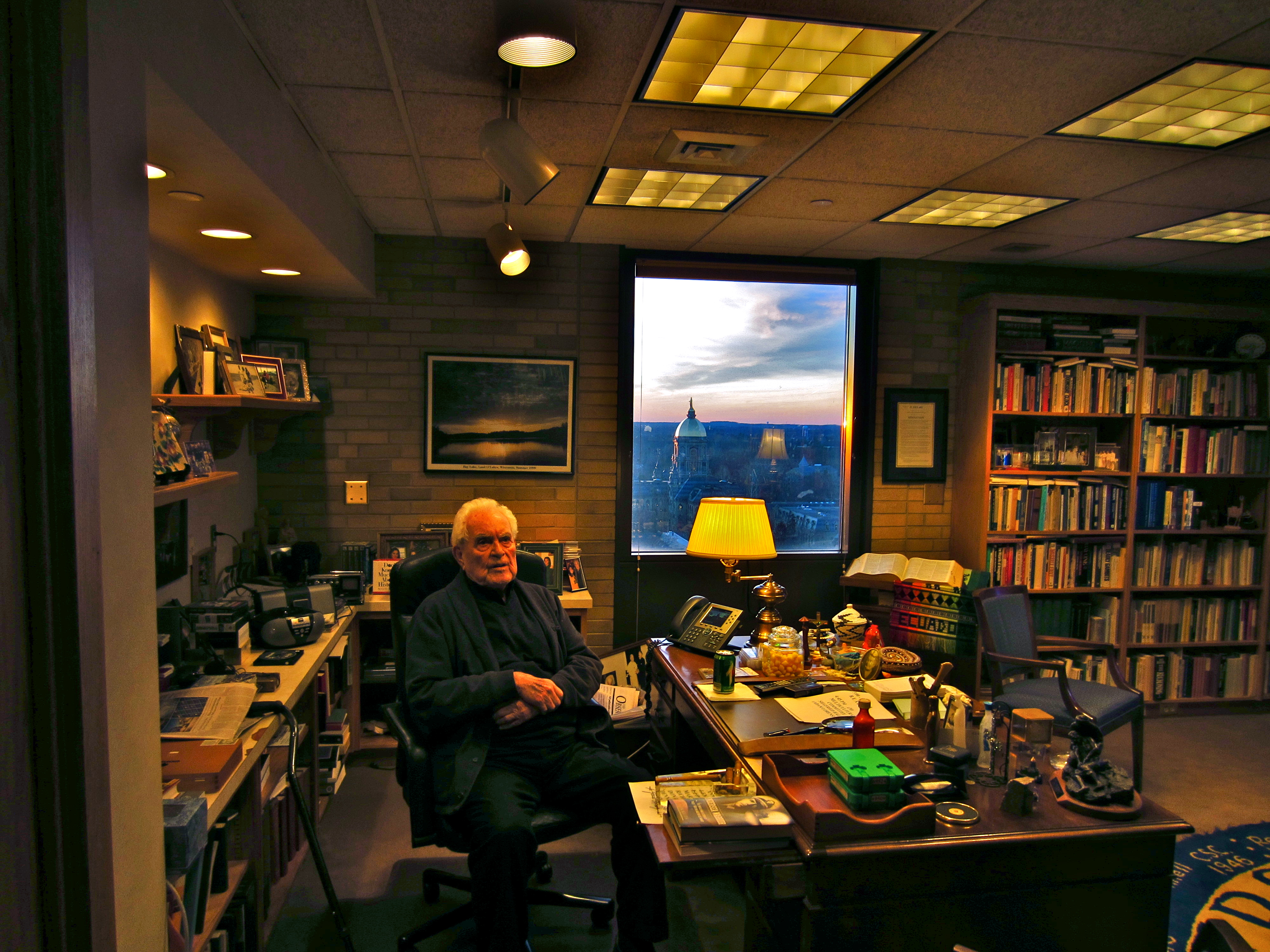
Theodore Hesburgh, photographed in 2012, was the 15th and longest-serving president of Notre Dame.

The university's president is always a priest of the Congregation of Holy Cross. The first president was Edward Sorin, and the current president is Robert A. Dowd. As of June 2024, John McGreevy is the provost overseeing academic functions. Until 1967, Notre Dame had been governed directly by the Congregation. Under the presidency of Theodore Hesburgh, two groups, the Board of Fellows, and the Board of Trustees, were established to govern the university. The 12 fellows are evenly divided between members of the Holy Cross order and the laity; they have final say over the operation of the university. They vote on potential trustees and sign off on all that board's major decisions. The trustees elect the president and provide general guidance and governance to the university.

=== Endowment ===
Notre Dame's endowment was started in the early 1920s by university president James Burns; it was $7 million by 1952 when Hesburgh became president. For fiscal year 2023, the university reported total endowment assets of $16.62 billion.

== Academics ==
=== Colleges and schools ===
- The College of Arts and Letters was established as the university's first college in 1842. The first degrees were granted seven years later. The university's first academic curriculum was modeled after the Jesuit Ratio Studiorum from Saint Louis University. Today, the college, housed in O'Shaughnessy Hall, includes 20 departments in the areas of fine arts, humanities, and social sciences, and awards Bachelor of Arts (B.A.) degrees in nearly 70 majors and minors, making it the largest of the university's colleges. As of 2022, there were 2,000 undergraduates and graduates enrolled in the college, taught by 500 faculty members.

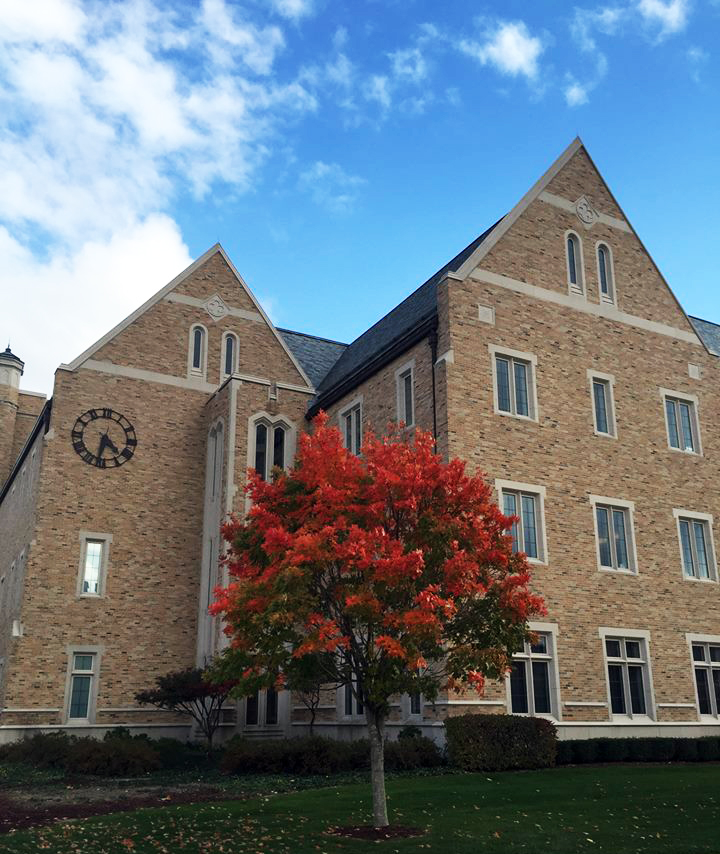
Jordan Hall of Science

- The College of Science was established in 1865. The curriculum involved six years of coursework, including higher-level mathematics. Today, the college, housed in the Jordan Hall of Science, includes over 1,200 undergraduates in several departments, each awarding Bachelor of Science (B.S.) degrees. According to university statistics, its science pre-professional program has one of the highest acceptance rates to medical school of any university in the United States.
- The Notre Dame Law School was established in 1869 and is the oldest law program at a Catholic university in the United States. In 2024, the school ranked 20th among the top American law schools by U.S. News & World Report. The law school grants the professional Juris Doctor degree, as well as the graduate Master of Laws, and Doctor of Juridical Science degrees. It was ranked fourth in graduates attaining federal judicial clerkships in 2024, and seventh in graduates attaining Supreme Court clerkships in 2020.

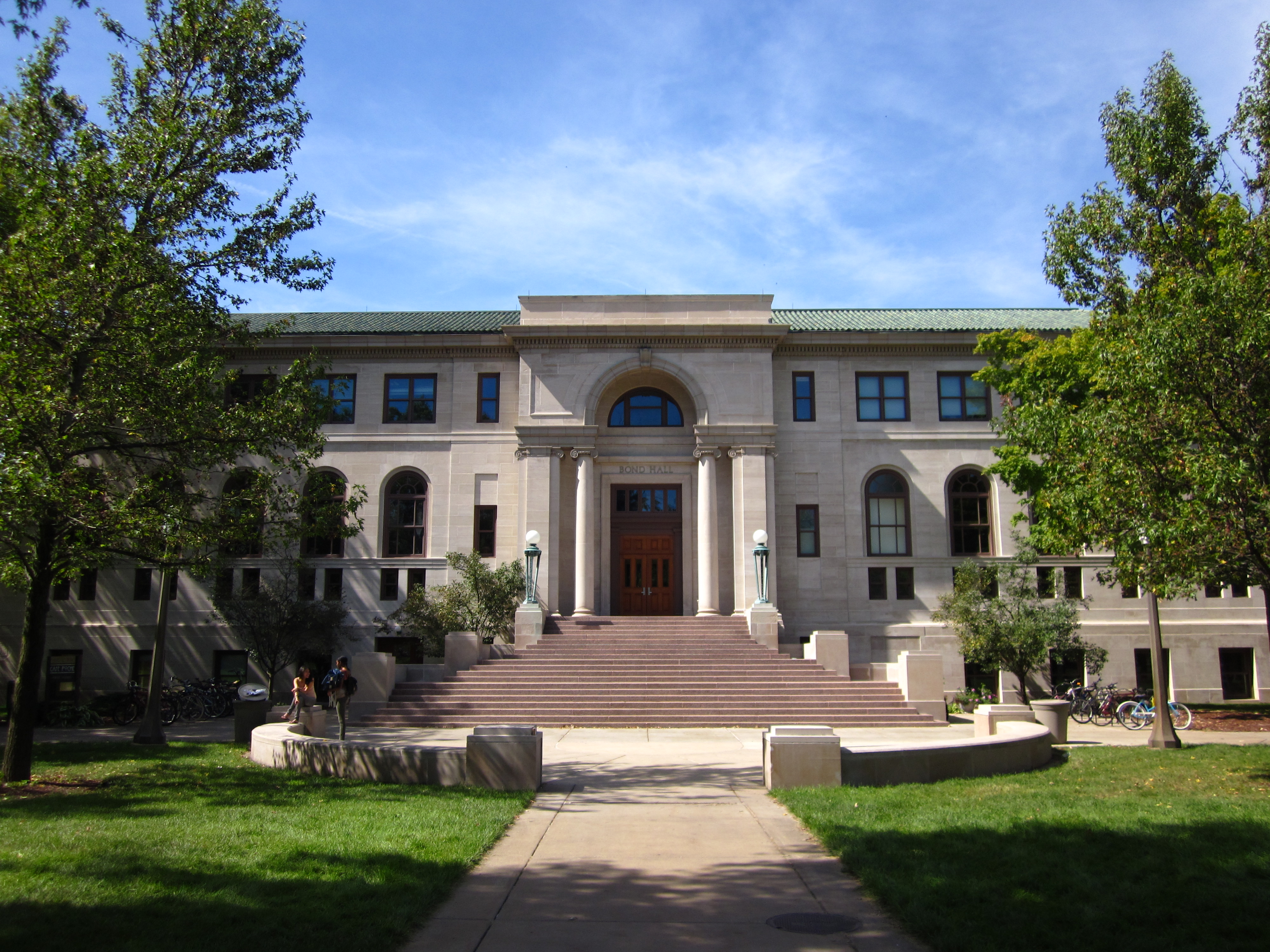
Bond Hall, house of the School of Architecture from 1964 until 2019

- The School of Architecture was established in 1899, the year after Notre Dame first granted degrees in the field. Today, the school, housed in Walsh Family Hall of Architecture, offers a five-year undergraduate program leading to a bachelor's degree. All undergraduates spend their third year in Rome. The faculty teaches (pre-modernist) traditional and classical architecture and urban planning (e.g., following the principles of New Urbanism and New Classical Architecture). It also awards the annual Driehaus Architecture Prize.
- The College of Engineering was established in 1920; however, courses in civil and mechanical engineering had been taught in the College of Science, since the 1870s. Today, the college, housed in the Fitzpatrick, Cushing, and Stinson-Remick Halls of Engineering, includes five departments of study, with eight B.S. degrees offered. The college also offers five-year dual degree programs with the College of Arts and Letters and the College of Business awarding additional B.A. and Master of Business Administration (MBA) degrees, respectively.
- The Mendoza College of Business was established in 1921 by John Francis O'Hara, although a foreign commerce program had been launched in 1917. Today, the college offers degrees in accountancy, finance, management, and marketing and enrolls over 1,600 students. In 2016, Bloomberg Businessweek ranked Mendoza's undergraduate program as second in the country, after five consecutive years in the first position. For its 2023 ranking, U.S. News & World Report ranked the graduate school 25th, tied with Vanderbilt University.
- The Keough School of Global Affairs was established in 2014. The first new school in nearly a century, it builds on the presence of seven institutes founded for international research, scholarship, and education at Notre Dame. The school offers six doctoral programs related to international peace studies, a master's in global affairs focused on either peace studies or sustainable development, and five undergraduate majors. It is focused on the study of global governance, human rights, and other areas of global social and political policy. A $50 million gift from Donald Keough, a former Coca-Cola executive, and his wife Marilyn funded the school's creation. The school opened officially in August 2017, in Jenkins Hall on Debartolo Quad.

==== Special programs ====
Every Notre Dame undergraduate is part of one of the school's five undergraduate colleges or is in the First Year of Studies program. The First Year of Studies program was established in 1962 to guide freshmen through their first year at the school before they have declared a major. Each student is assigned an academic advisor who helps them choose classes that give them exposure to any major in which they are interested. The program includes a Learning Resource Center, which provides time management, collaborative learning, and subject tutoring. First Year of Studies is designed to encourage intellectual and academic achievement and innovation among first-year students. It includes programs such as FY advising, the Dean's A-list, the Renaissance circle, NDignite, the First Year Urban challenge, and more. Every admissions cycle, the Office of Undergraduate Admissions selects a small number of students for the Glynn Family Honors Program, which grants top students within the College of Arts and Letters and the College of Science access to smaller class sizes taught by distinguished faculty, endowed funding for independent research, and dedicated advising faculty and staff.

=== Graduate education ===
Each college offers graduate education in the form of master's and doctoral programs. Most of the departments in the College of Arts and Letters offer PhDs, while a professional Master of Divinity (M.Div.) program also exists. All of the departments in the College of Science offer PhDs, except for the Department of Pre-Professional Studies. The School of Architecture offers a Master of Architecture, while each of the departments of the College of Engineering offer PhDs. The College of Business offers multiple professional programs, including MBA and Master of Science in Accountancy programs. It also operates facilities in Chicago and Cincinnati for its executive MBA program. The Alliance for Catholic Education program offers a Master of Education program, where students study at the university during the summer and teach in Catholic elementary schools, middle schools, and high schools across the South for two school years.

The university first offered graduate degrees, in the form of a Master of Arts (MA), in the 1854–1855 academic year. The program expanded to include Master of Laws (LLM) and Master of Civil Engineering in its early stages of growth, before a formal graduate school education was developed with a thesis not required to receive the degrees. This changed in 1924, with formal requirements developed for graduate degrees, including offering doctorates. Although Notre Dame does not have its own medical school, it offers a combined MD–PhD though the regional campus of the Indiana University School of Medicine, where Indiana medical students may spend the first two years of their medical education before transferring to the main medical campus at Indiana University–Purdue University Indianapolis.

=== Centers and institutes ===
In 2019, Notre Dame announced plans to rename the Center for Ethics and Culture, an organization focused on spreading Catholic moral and intellectual traditions. A $10 million gift from Anthony and Christie de Nicola funded the new de Nicola Center for Ethics and Culture.

The university is also home to the McGrath Institute for Church Life, which "partners with Catholic dioceses, parishes and schools to address pastoral challenges with theological depth and rigor".

The Joan B. Kroc Institute for International Peace Studies, founded in 1986 by donations from Joan B. Kroc, the surviving spouse of McDonald's owner Ray Kroc and inspired by Father Hesburgh, is dedicated to research, education, and outreach on the causes of violent conflict and the conditions for sustainable peace. It offers Ph.D., master's, and undergraduate degrees in peace studies. It has contributed to international policy discussions about peace building practices.

=== Libraries ===
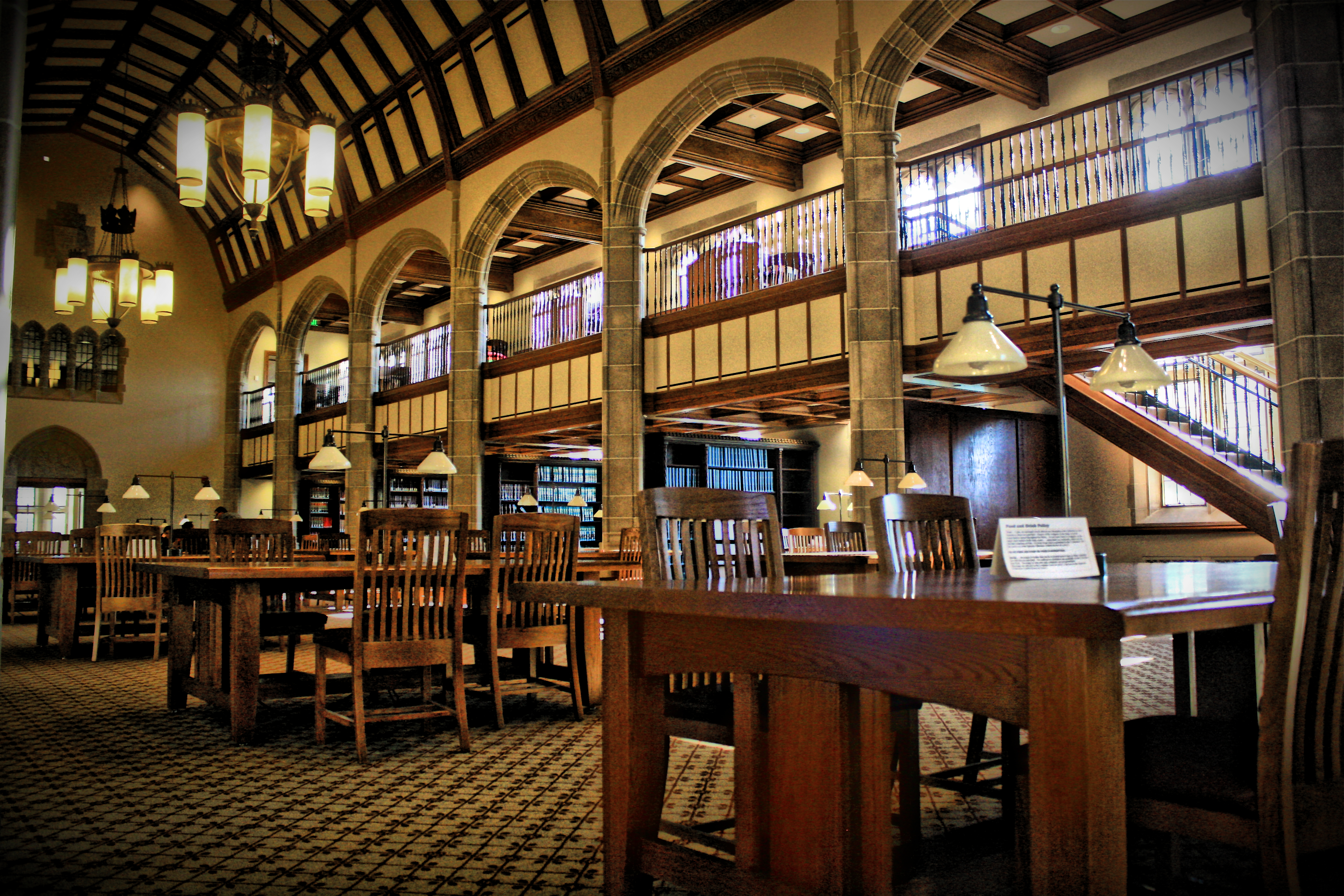
The interior of the Kresge Law Library at the Notre Dame Law School

The university's library system is divided among the main 14-story Theodore M. Hesburgh Library, and each of the colleges and schools. The Hesburgh Library, completed in 1963, is the third building to house the main collection. The Word of Life mural by Millard Sheets, popularly known as "Touchdown Jesus" because of its proximity to Notre Dame Stadium and Jesus' arms appearing to make the signal for a touchdown, adorns the front of the library.

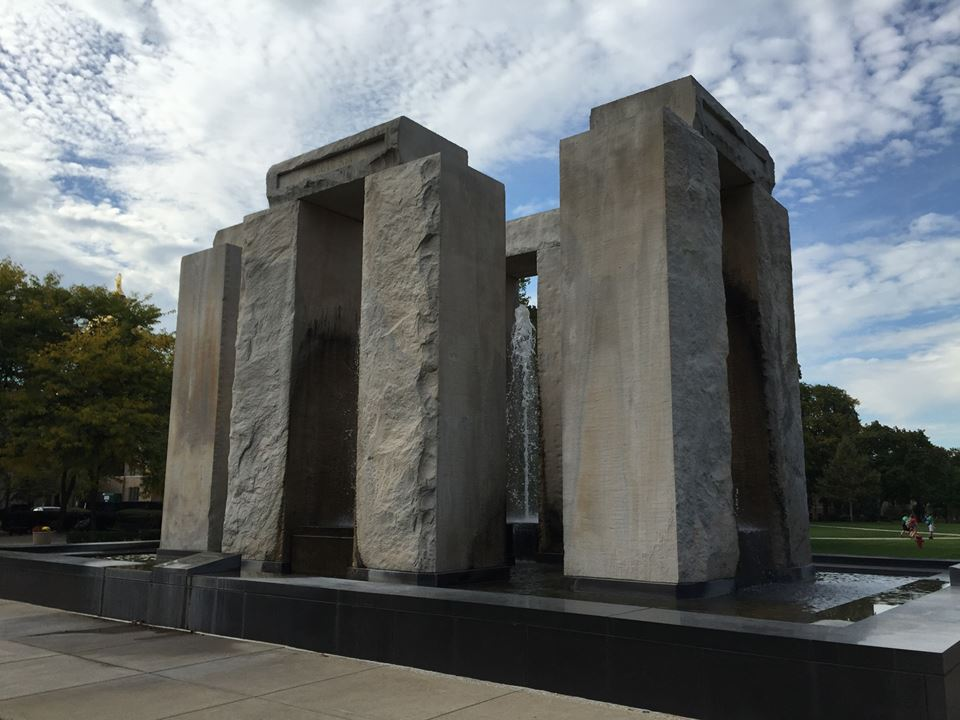
The Clarke Memorial Fountain, a war memorial dedicated in 1986, known colloquially as "Stonehenge"

The library system also includes branch libraries for Architecture, Chemistry and Physics, Engineering, Law, Music, and Mathematics and information centers in the Mendoza College of Business, the Kellogg Institute for International Studies, the Joan B. Kroc Institute for International Peace Studies, and a slide library in O'Shaughnessy Hall. A theology library, opened in the fall of 2015 on the first floor of Stanford Hall, is the first branch of the library system to be housed in a dorm room. With over three million volumes, the library system was the single largest university library in the world at the time of completion. It remains one of the hundred largest libraries in the country.

=== Admissions ===
Undergraduate admission statistics
	Fall 2025	Fall 2024	Fall 2023	Fall 2022	Fall 2021
First-time Freshmen
Applicants	35,401	29,942	28,353	26,509	23,642
Admits	3,320	3,374	3,510	3,421	3,562
Admit rate	9%	11%	12%	13%	15%
Enrolled	2,118	2,082	2,075	2,037	2,059
Yield rate	64%	62%	59%	60%	58%
Transfers
Applicants	1,541	1,064	842	794	1,076
Admits	262	267	232	212	277
Admit rate	17%	25%	28%	27%	26%
Enrolled	207	203	192	189	224
Yield rate	79%	76%	83%	89%	81%

The fall of 2026 the university received 36,102 applicantations and accepted 9 percent into the Class of 2030. The incoming cohort had a 65 percent yield rate with 2,160 accepted students enrolling into the university. The university practices a non-restrictive early action policy that allows admitted students to consider admission to Notre Dame and any other colleges that accepted them. This process admitted 1,617 of the 13,711 (12 percent) who requested it. Students from all 50 states were accepted with 183 countries also represented. All students begin in the College of the First Year of Studies with the ability to declare a major their second year.

=== Tuition ===
Tuition for full-time students at the University of Notre Dame in 2023 is $69,280 a year. Room and board is estimated to be an additional $18,992 a year for students who live in campus housing. Total cost of attendance for the undergraduate program is estimated at $91,986. Notre Dame is a private university, so it offers the same tuition for in-state and out-of-state students. In 2024, the university announced the Pathways program joining a small group of US institutions offering Need-blind admission regardless of citizenship. As part of their need-based financial aid, Notre Dame covers half tuition for undergraduate students and families earning under $200,000 annually, full tuition for those earning under $150,000 and full tuition alongside fees, housing and food for families earning under $60,000 annually. The Office of Financial Aid provides assistance to over 70% of the undergraduate population.

=== Rankings ===
Academic rankings

National
- Forbes: 33
- U.S. News & World Report: 20 (tie)
- Washington Monthly: 38
- WSJ/College Pulse: 20

Global
- ARWU: 301–400
- QS: 294 (tie)
- THE: 194
- U.S. News & World Report: 407 (tie)

USNWR graduate rankings
Business	32 (tie)
Engineering	47 (tie)
Law	20 (tie)

USNWR graduate departmental rankings
Biological Sciences	68 (tie)
Chemistry	46 (tie)
Clinical Psychology	38 (tie)
Computer Science	54 (tie)
Earth Sciences	98 (tie)
Economics	46 (tie)
English	21 (tie)
Fine Arts	99 (tie)
History	34 (tie)
Mathematics	37 (tie)
Physics	47 (tie)
Political Science	27 (tie)
Psychology	62 (tie)
Sociology	28 (tie)
Statistics	61 (tie)

In the 2026 of Best Colleges, Notre Dame ranked 10th for "best undergraduate teaching", 20th for "best value" school and tied for 20th overall among "national universities" in the United States in U.S. News & World Report's report. The university is a member of the Oak Ridge Associated Universities Consortium.

== Research ==
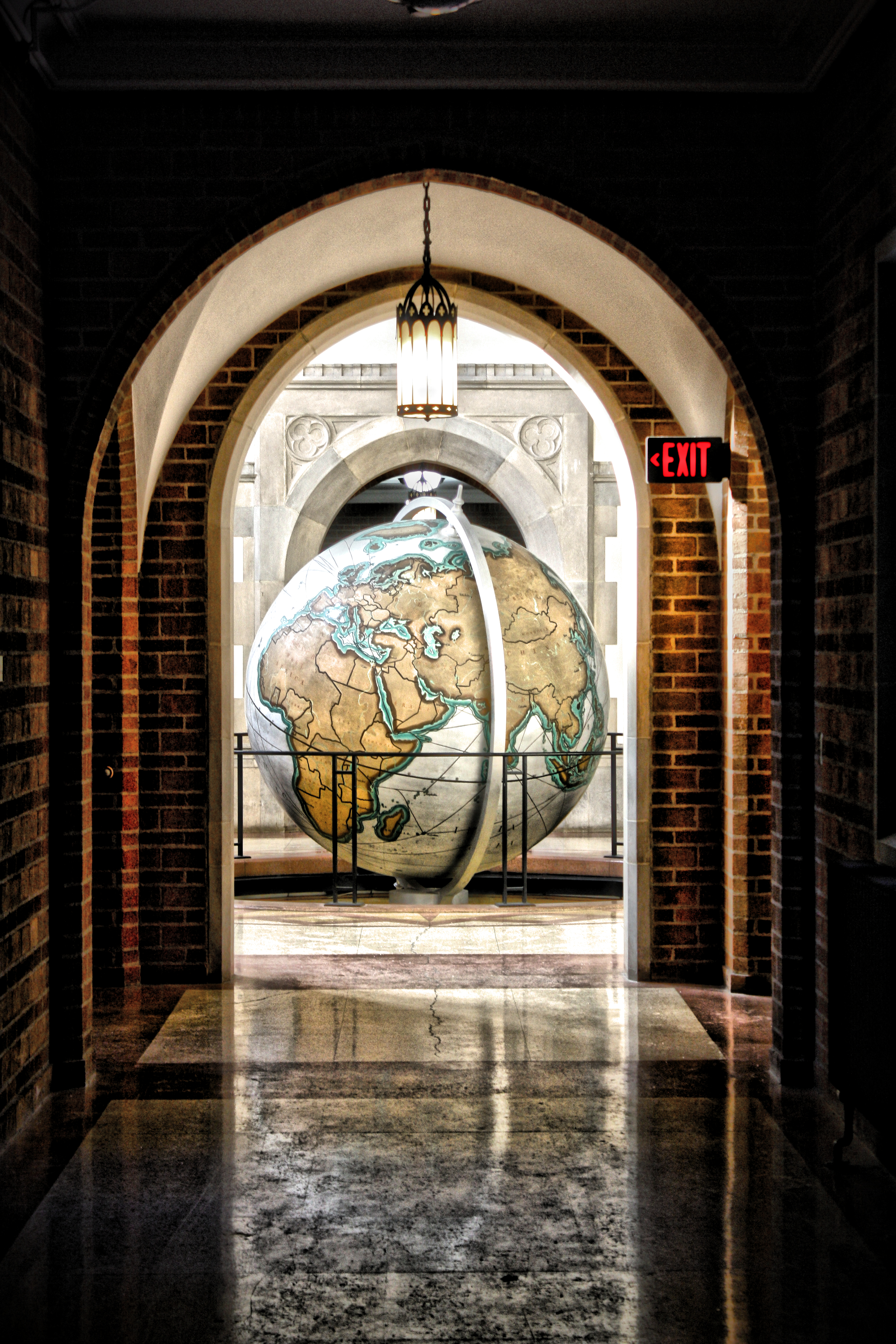
Hallway within Hurley Hall

Joseph Carrier, director of the Science Museum and the library, was a professor of chemistry and physics until 1874. Carrier taught that scientific research and its promise for progress were not antagonistic to the ideals of intellectual and moral culture endorsed by the Catholic Church. Notable researchers in the early history of the university include John Augustine Zahm, whose book Evolution and Dogma (1896) defended certain aspects of evolutionary theory as true; Albert Zahm, John's brother, who built an early wind tunnel to compare lift to drag of aeronautical models; Jerome Green, who became the first American to send a wireless message; and Julius Nieuwland, who performed early work on basic reactions that were used to create neoprene. The study of nuclear physics at the university began with the building of a nuclear accelerator in 1936 and continues now partly through a partnership in the Joint Institute for Nuclear Astrophysics.

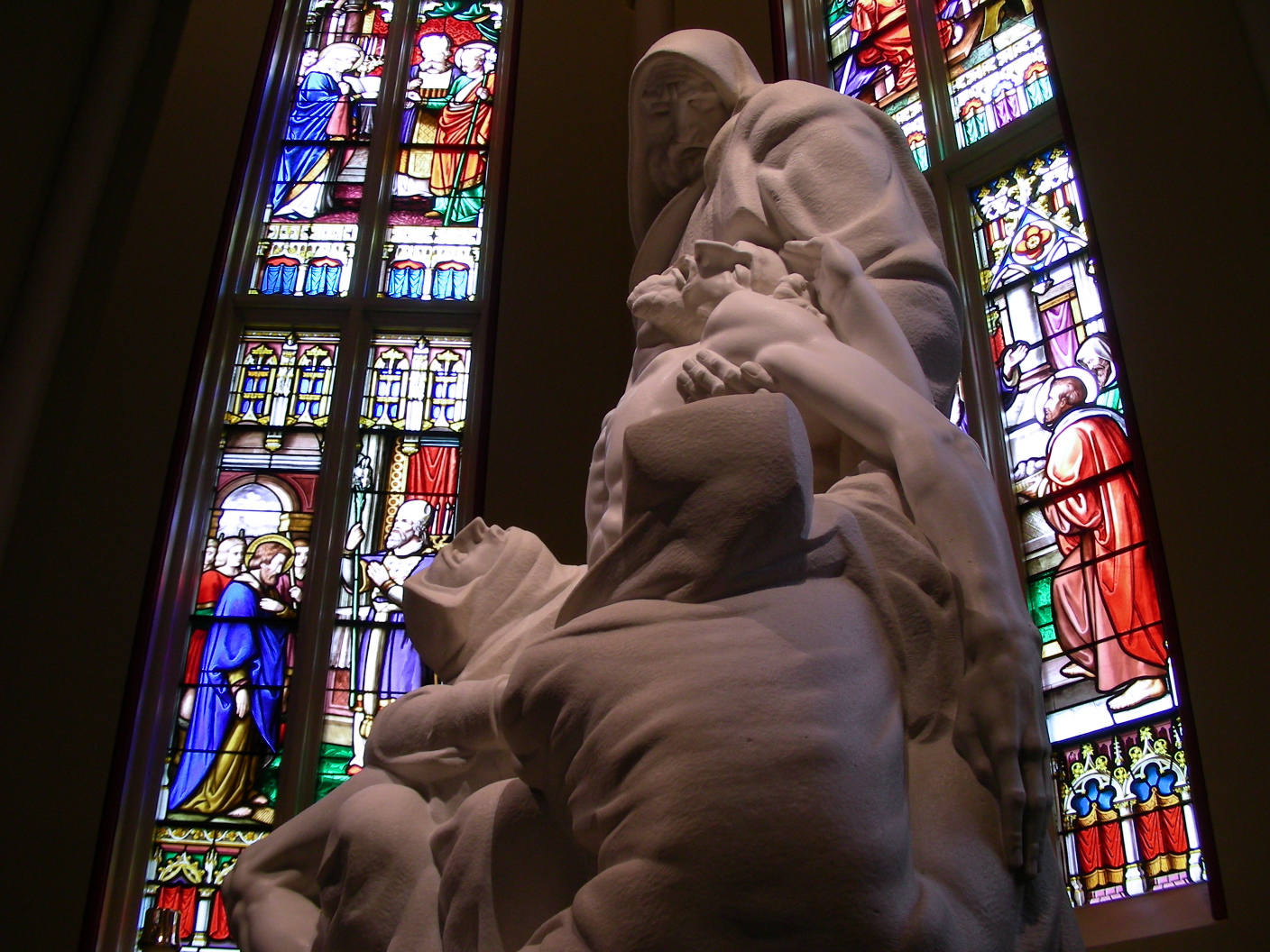
The Pietà by Ivan Meštrović, a European émigré

The rise of Hitler and other dictators in the 1930s forced many Catholic intellectuals to flee Europe; President John O'Hara brought many of them to Notre Dame. Anton-Hermann Chroust, in classics and law, and Waldemar Gurian, a German Catholic intellectual of Jewish descent, came from Germany. Ivan Meštrović, a renowned sculptor, brought Croat culture to campus. Yves Simon brought the insights of French studies in the Aristotelian-Thomistic tradition of philosophy to the university in the 1940s; his teacher, Jacques Maritain, was a frequent visitor to campus. The exiles developed a distinctive emphasis on the evils of totalitarianism. Richard T. Sullivan taught English from 1936 to 1974 and published six novels, dozens of short stories, and other works. Frank O'Malley was an English professor during the 1930s through the 1960s who developed a concept of Christian philosophy that was a fundamental element in his thought. In 1939, Waldemar Gurian founded The Review of Politics, which quickly emerged as part of an international Catholic intellectual revival, offering an alternative vision to positivist philosophy. The College of Arts and Letters is distinguished for its contributions in the field of theology and religious studies, while its affiliated Medieval Institute is the largest center for medieval studies in North America. The university has many multi-disciplinary research institutes, including the Medieval Institute, the Kellogg Institute for International Studies, the Kroc Institute for International Peace Studies, and the Center for Social Concerns. Recent research includes work on family conflict and child development, genome mapping, the increasing trade deficit of the United States with China, studies in fluid mechanics, computational science and engineering, supramolecular chemistry, and marketing trends on the Internet. As of 2013, the university was home to the Notre Dame Global Adaptation Index, which ranks countries annually based on how vulnerable they are to climate change and how prepared they are to adapt.

In the fiscal 2019, the university received the all-time high research funding of $180.6 million, an increase of $100 million from 2009 and a 27 percent increase from the previous year, with funded projects including vector-borne diseases, urbanism, environmental design, cancer, psychology, economics, philosophy of religion, particle physics, nanotechnology, and hypersonics. Notre Dame has a strong background in the humanities, with 65 National Endowment for the Humanities fellowships, more than any other university. Focus areas include anti-poverty economic strategy, the premier Medieval Institute, Latino studies, sacred music, Italian studies, Catholic studies, psychology, aging and stress, social good, and theology. In the sciences, research focuses and specialized centers include the Harper Cancer Research Institute, the Boler-Parseghian Center for Rare and Neglected Diseases, the Center for Nano Science and Technology, the Center for Stem Cells and Regenerative Medicine, the Eck Institute for Global Health, the Joint Institute for Nuclear Astrophysics, the University of Notre Dame Environmental Research Center, Topology and Quantum Field Theory, the Nuclear Physics Research Group, and the Environmental Change Initiative.

== Student life ==
Student body composition as of May 2, 2022
Race and ethnicity	Total
White	68%
Hispanic	12%
Other (Note: Other consists of Multiracial Americans & those who prefer to not say.)	7%
Asian	5%
Foreign national	5%
Black	3%
Economic diversity
Low-income (Note: The percentage of students who received an income-based federal Pell grant intended for low-income students.)	11%
Affluent (Note: The percentage of students who are a part of the American middle class at the bare minimum.)	89%

As of Fall 2024, the Notre Dame student body consisted of 8,880 undergraduates and 4,162 graduate and professional (Law, M.Div., Business, MEd) students. An estimated 21–24 percent of students are children of alumni, and the student body represents all 50 states and 88 countries. Thirty-seven percent of students come from the Midwestern United States, 40 percent of students are U.S. students of color, and eight percent are international citizens.

=== Residence halls ===
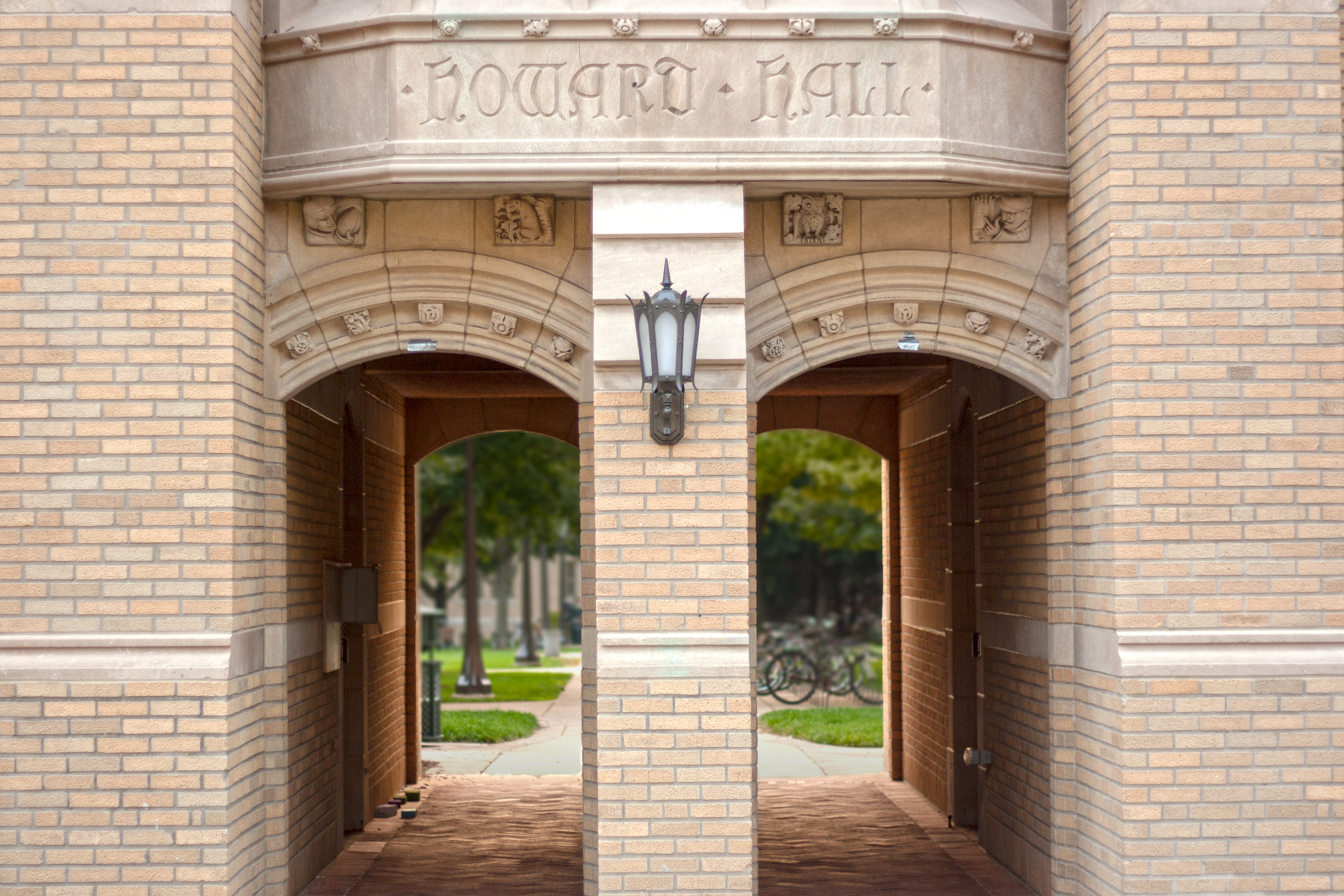
Howard Hall, one of 15 women's dormitories

The residence halls, or dorms, are the focus of student social and intramural life. Each hall is led by a rector, a full-time, live-in professional who serves as leader, chief administrator, community builder and university resource to the residents, and is a priest, religious sister or brother, or a layperson trained in ministry or education. Rectors direct the hall community, foster bonding, and often coordinate with professors, academic advisors, and counselors to watch over students and assist them with their personal development. Rectors select, hire, train, and supervise hall staff: resident assistants (required to be seniors) and assistant rectors (graduate students). Many residence halls also have a priest or faculty members in residence as faculty fellows, who provide an additional academic and intellectual experience to residential hall life. Every hall has its own chapel, dedicated to the hall's patron saint, and liturgical schedule with masses celebrated multiple times a week during the academic year, in the tradition of individual chapels at English university colleges.

Fraternities and sororities are not allowed on campus, as they are described as in opposition to the university's educational and residential mission. The residential halls provide the social and communal aspect of fraternities, but in line with the university's policy of inclusion and zero tolerance of hazing.

Over four-fifths of students live in the same residence hall for three consecutive years and about one-third of students live in the same residence hall for all four years As of October 2017. A new policy was put into effect beginning in 2018, which required undergraduates to live on-campus for three years. In spring 2019, the university also announced a policy (that has since been reversed) that prohibited students living off campus from participating in dorm activities, such as intramural sports and dorm dances. Most intramural (interhall) sports are based on residence hall teams, where the university offers the only non-military academy program of full-contact intramural American football. At the end of the interhall football season, the championship game is played in Notre Dame Stadium.

=== Student clubs ===
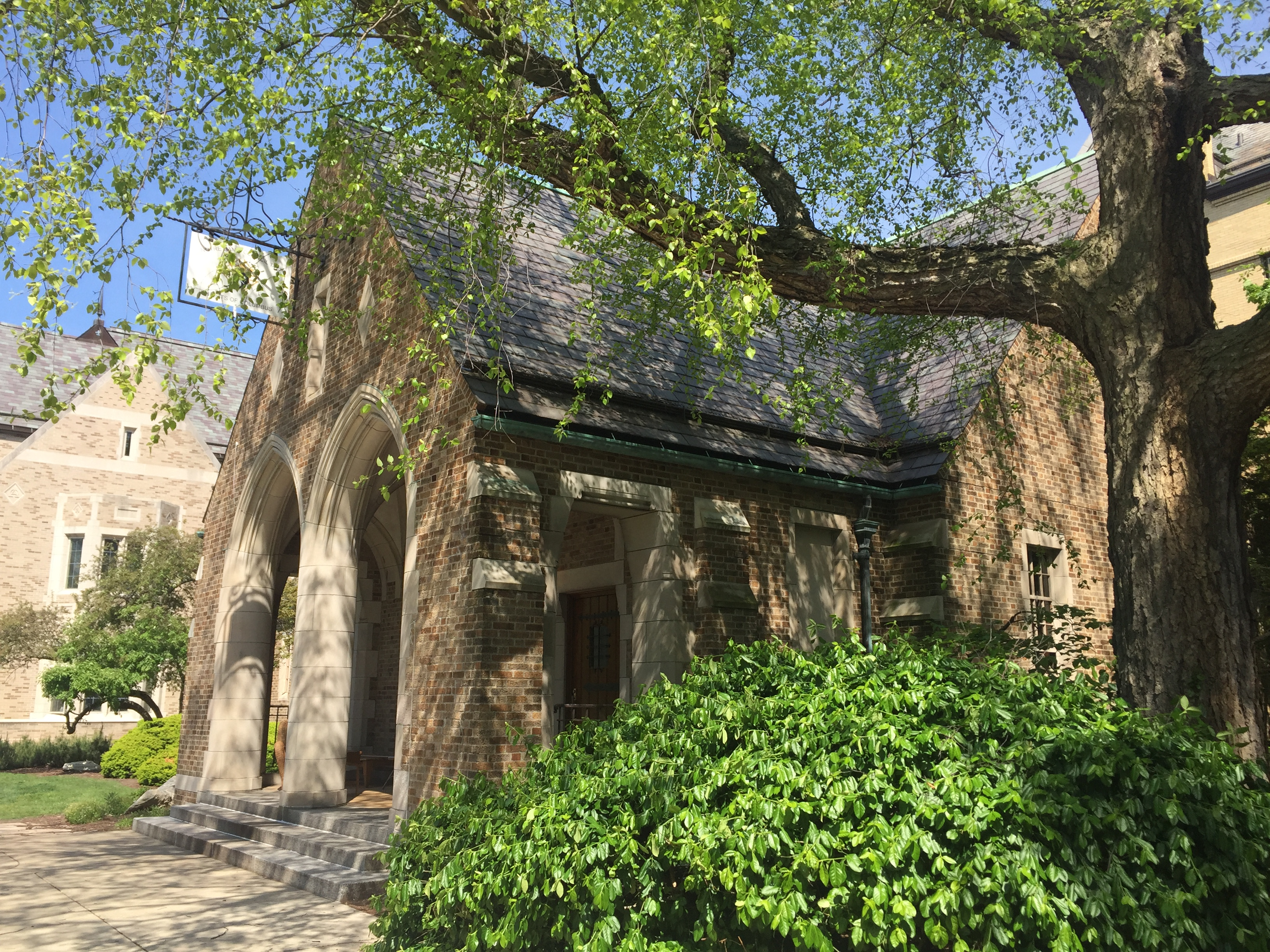
The hall of the Notre Dame Council of the Knights of Columbus

There are over 400 active student clubs at the University of Notre Dame, with the financial oversight of each club delegated by the student-run Club Coordination Council. The university subsidizes clubs, providing almost 15 percent of clubs' collective projected expenditures of $2.2 million during the 2018–2019 academic year. There are a variety of student clubs on campus, including nine for students from different states, about three dozen clubs that represent different nationalities and origins, and clubs dedicated to Catholic theology, diverse faith practices, social service, political advocacy and awareness, competitive athletics, professional development and networking, performing arts, academic debate, foreign affairs, fraternal brotherhood, women's empowerment, and many other interests. The university hosts their annual Student Activities Fair early in the fall semester for all students interested in joining clubs or other student organizations.

=== Student union ===
The Notre Dame Student Union is divided into nine branches, as articulated in Article I, Section 2 of the Constitution of the Undergraduate Student Body of the University of Notre Dame du Lac.

==== Senate ====
The Student Senate is the legislative body of the student union that formulates and advances the positions of the undergraduate student body on all issues concerning campus life. The Senate is composed of representatives from each of the university's undergraduate residence halls and other representatives from the student union.

==== Executive Cabinet ====
The Executive Cabinet is led by the student body president and vice president. Membership is composed of Cabinet directors who lead various departments. The Executive Cabinet is tasked with advancing the agenda of the president and vice-president through working to protect the interests of students in all areas of university life, provide services to the undergraduate student body, and advance the policy priorities of the broader student union.

==== Student union board ====
According to the student union board's (SUB) mission statement, "The SUB Programming Body shall enhance undergraduate student life by providing undergraduate student services and social, intellectual, and cultural opportunities that respond to the needs and wants of the undergraduate student body in the most efficient manner possible." SUB is divided into seven committees, which consist of Acousticafé, AnTostal, Community Engagement, Concerts, First Look Into Programming (FLIP), Live Entertainment, and Signature Events.

==== Hall Presidents Council ====
The Hall Presidents Council (HPC) is responsible for planning, funding, and executing residence hall events. The council is composed of leadership from all of Notre Dame's undergraduate residence halls, in addition to council leaders.

==== Club Coordination Council ====
The Club Coordination Council (CCC) is responsible for communicating issues facing undergraduate club issues, providing funding for undergraduate clubs, serving as the representative body of undergraduate student clubs, and working with student clubs to ensure that clubs can coordinate their programming of activities. The CCC oversees around 400 student clubs, each of which serves a unique purpose. The approval of the council, along with that of the Notre Dame Student Activities Office, is a requirement for official recognition of student clubs.

==== Class councils ====
There are four class councils, one representing each undergraduate class level: first-year, sophomore, junior, and senior class councils. They each promote the wellbeing of their respective classes by sponsoring functions that promote unity among class members. Each class is represented by four elected class officers, including a president, vice-president, treasurer, and secretary. In addition to the officers, the class councils are made up of members from all across campus that work together to plan events.

==== Off-Campus Council ====
The Off-Campus Council represents any undergraduate students not residing on the campus of the university. They provide to the needs of those students, given that the issues differ from those residing in the dorms.

==== Financial management board ====
The financial management board (FMB) is responsible for the creation and maintenance of a budget for the student union. FMB conducts an annual hearing to ensure that undergraduate funds are allocated fairly, known as the annual allocation hearing. The FMB representative from each organization prepares a budget and then meets with the Student Union Treasurer to discuss their organization's monetary needs, which are presented at the Annual Allocation Hearing. After the allocations are agreed upon by its members, the budget is proposed to the Senate Committee on the Budget, which either approves or rejects these allocations.

==== Judicial Council ====
The Judicial Council is tasked with overseeing the ethical behavior of student union leaders, maintaining the constitutional conduct of the student union, administering its elections, and providing support through Peer Advocates to students navigating the Office of Community Standards' hearings and conferences.

=== Student events ===
Website BestColleges.com ranks the university's intramural sports program as number one in the country in 2021. Over 700 teams participate each year in the annual Bookstore Basketball tournament; while the Notre Dame Men's Boxing Club hosts the annual Bengal Bouts tournament to raise money for the Holy Cross Missions in Bangladesh. In the fall, the Notre Dame Women's Boxing Club hosts an annual Baraka Bouts tournament that raises money for the Congregation of the Holy Cross Missions in Uganda.

Many of the most popular student events held on campus are organized by the 33 residential halls. Among these, the most notable are the Keenan Revue, the Fisher Hall Regatta, Howard Hall Totter for Water, Keenan Hall Muddy Sunday, the Morrissey Hall Medallion Hunt, the Dillon Hall Pep Rally, the Keough Hall Chariot Race and many others. Each dorm also hosts many formal and informal balls and dances each year.

=== Religious life ===
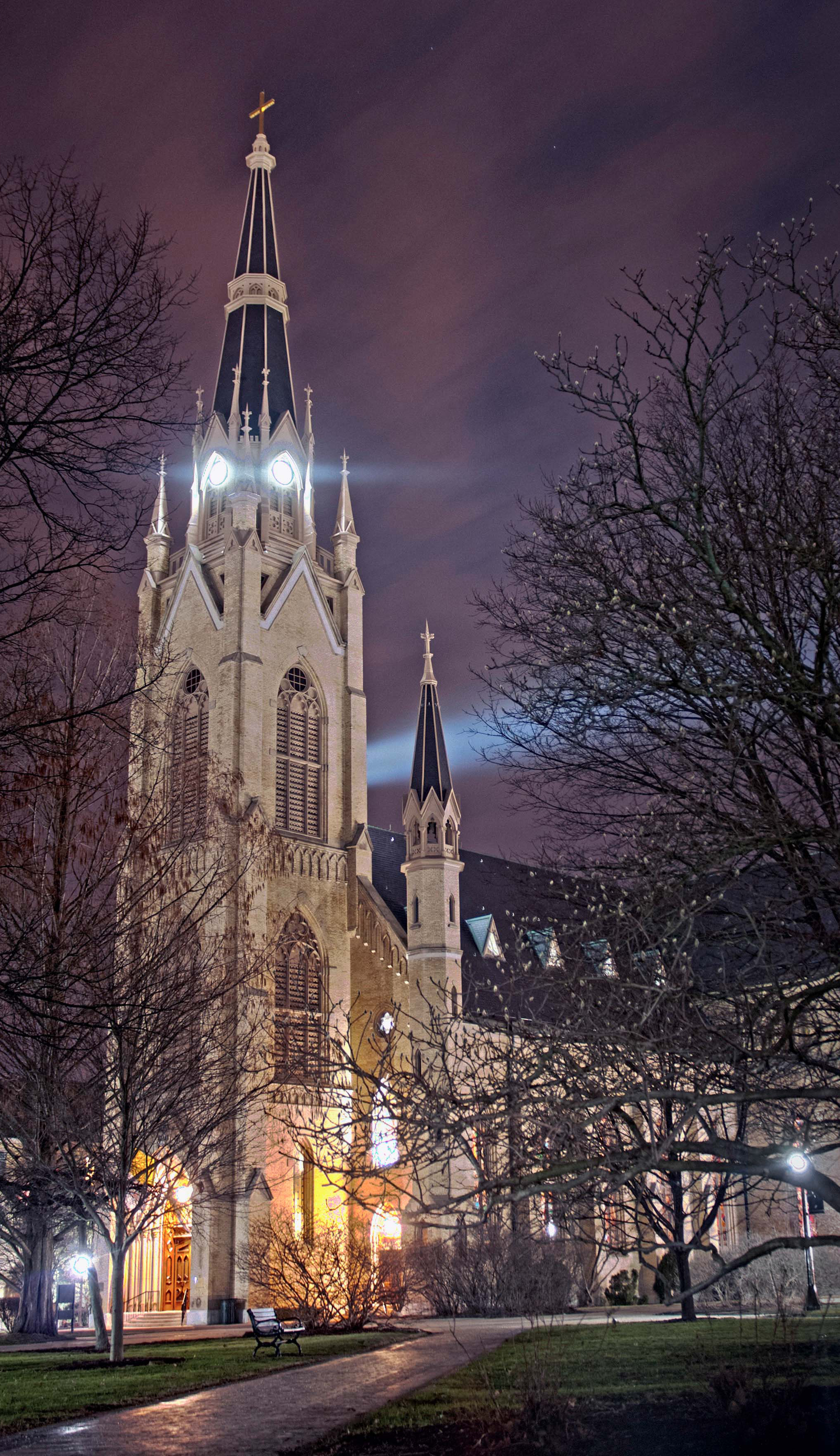
Basilica of the Sacred Heart at night

While having a religious affiliation is not a criterion for admission, over 93 percent of students identify as Christian, with over 80 percent of those being Catholic. There are 57 chapels on campus, including one in every residence hall. Collectively, Catholic Mass is celebrated over 100 times per week on campus, and a large campus ministry program provides for the faith needs of the community. There is also an active council of the Knights of Columbus on campus, which is the oldest and largest college council of the international Catholic men's organization. Non-Catholic religious organizations on campus include the Baptist Collegiate Ministry (BCM), Jewish Club of Notre Dame, the Muslim Student Association, the Orthodox Christian Fellowship, the Chi Alpha Christian Fellowship, and many more.

The university is the major seat of the Congregation of Holy Cross (albeit not its official headquarters, which are in Rome). Its main seminary, Moreau Seminary, is on the campus across St. Joseph Lake from the Main Building. Old College, the oldest building on campus near the shore of St. Mary's Lake, houses undergraduate seminarians. Retired priests and brothers reside in Fatima House (a former retreat center), Holy Cross House, and Columba Hall near the Grotto.

=== Student-run media ===
Notre Dame students run nine media outlets: three newspapers, a radio and television station, and several magazines and journals.

The Scholastic magazine, begun as a one-page journal in 1876, is issued twice monthly and claims to be the oldest continuous collegiate publication in the United States. The other magazine, The Juggler, is released twice a year and focuses on student literature and artwork. The Dome yearbook is published annually. The newspapers have varying publication interests, with The Observer published daily and mainly reporting university and other news, staffed by students from both Notre Dame and Saint Mary's College. Unlike Scholastic and The Dome, The Observer is an independent publication and does not have a faculty advisor or any editorial oversight from the university. In 2003, when other students believed that the paper had a liberal bias, they started The Irish Rover, a print and digital newspaper published twice per month that features regular columns from alumni and faculty and coverage of campus matters. As of 2005, The Observer and the Irish Rover were distributed to all students. In Spring 2008, Beyond Politics, an undergraduate journal for political science research, made its debut. In May 2023, a professor at the university, Tamara Kay, sued the Rover for defamation. The case was dismissed, and Kay filed an appeal in February 2024.

WSND-FM serves the student body and the larger South Bend community at 88.9 FM, offering students a chance to become involved in bringing classical music, fine arts and educational programming, and alternative rock to the airwaves. Another radio station, WVFI, began as a partner of WSND-FM; it now airs independently and is streamed on the Internet.

The television station (NDtv) grew from one show in 2002 to a full 24-hour channel with original programming by 2006.

== Athletics ==
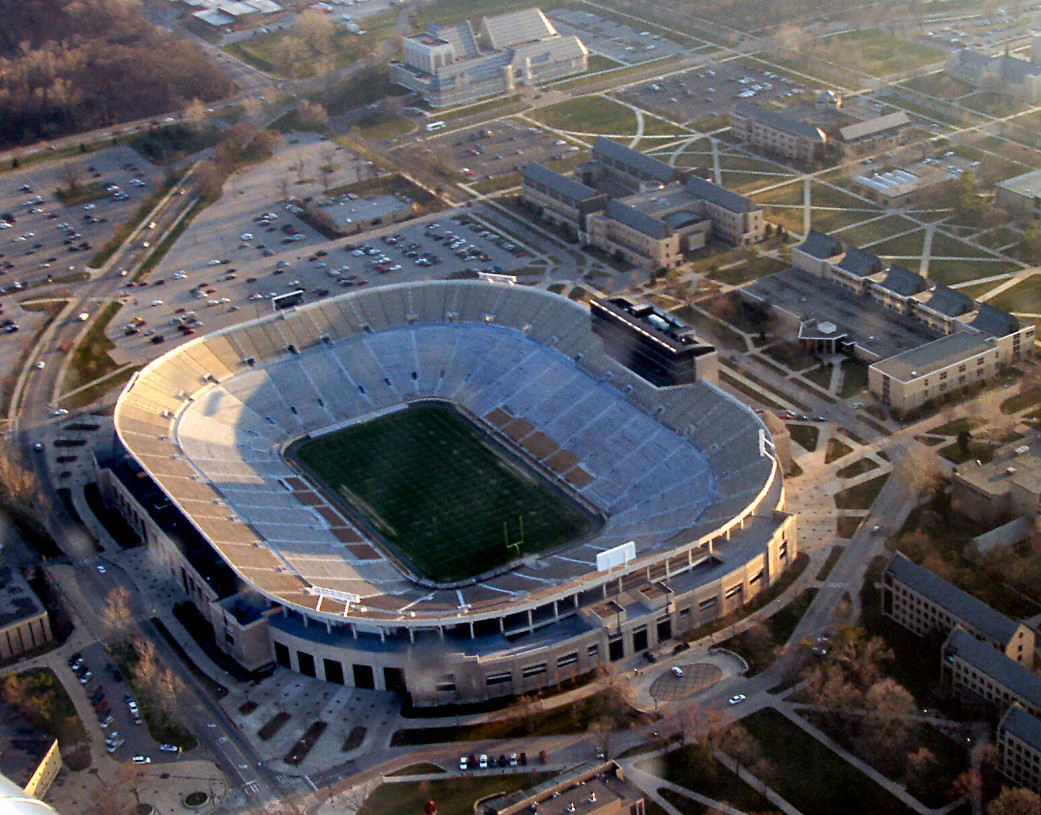
Notre Dame Stadium

Notre Dame's sports teams are known as the Fighting Irish. They compete as a member of the National Collegiate Athletic Association (NCAA) Division I, primarily competing in the Atlantic Coast Conference (ACC) for all sports—except football and hockey —since the 2013–14 school year. Men's ice hockey is played in the Big Ten conference. Notre Dame men compete in baseball, basketball, cross country, fencing, football, golf, ice hockey, lacrosse, soccer, swimming and diving, tennis, track and field, and volleyball. Women's sports are basketball, cross country, fencing, golf, lacrosse, rowing, soccer, softball, swimming and diving, tennis, track and field, and volleyball. The football team competes as a Football Bowl Subdivision (FBS) Independent since its inception in 1887, except for 2020, when it competed as part of the Atlantic Coast Conference. Both fencing teams compete in the Midwest Fencing Conference.

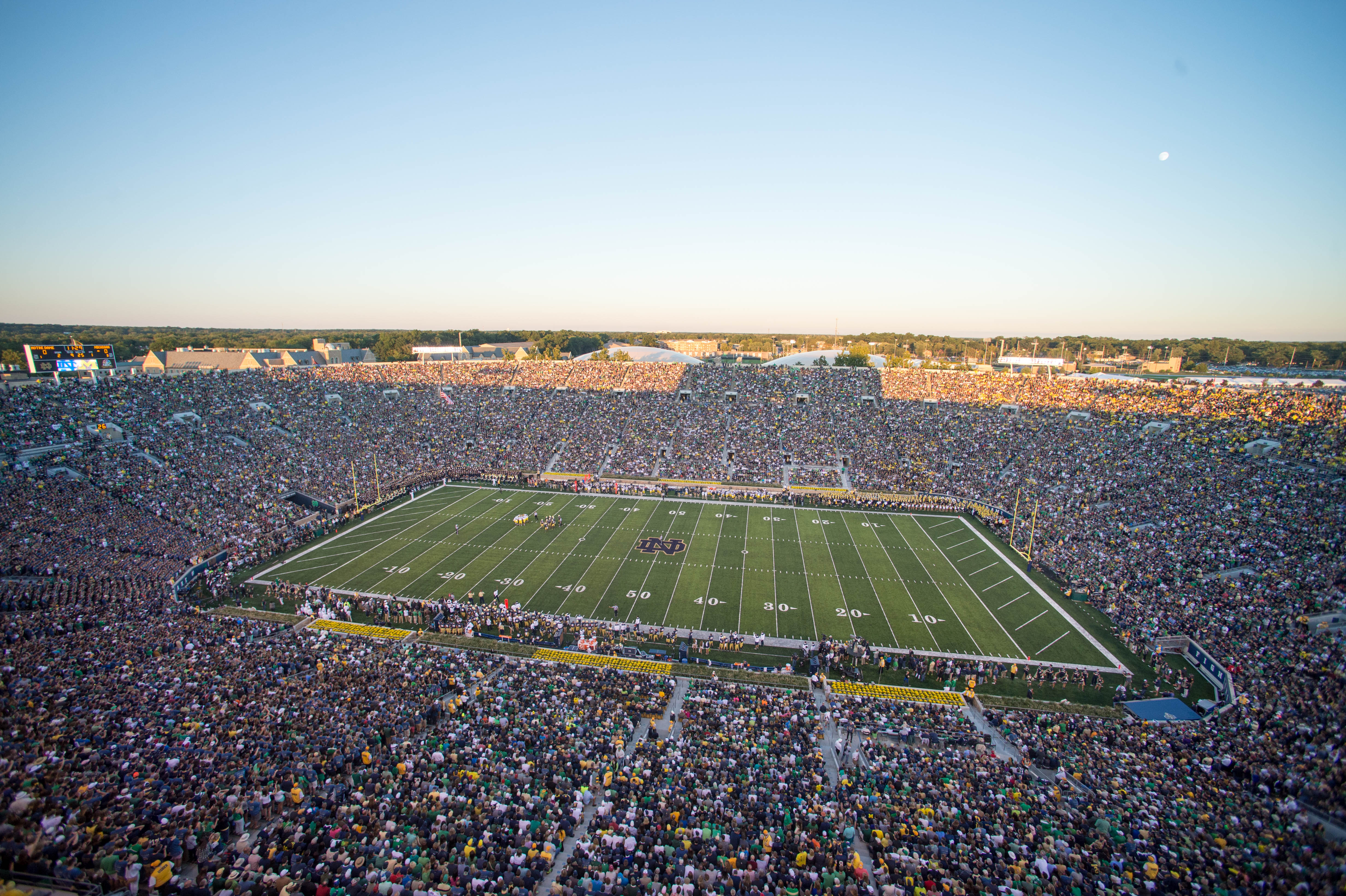
Football stadium during a game

Notre Dame's sports conference affiliations, except football and fencing, changed in July 2013 because of major conference realignment, and its fencing affiliation changed in July 2014. The Irish left the Big East for the ACC during a prolonged period of instability in the Big East; while they maintain their football independence, they have committed to playing five games per season against ACC opponents. After Notre Dame joined the ACC, the conference announced it would add fencing as a sponsored sport beginning in the 2014–15 school year.

There are many theories behind the adoption of the team name but the Fighting Irish name was used in the early 1920s with respect to the football team, and alumnus Francis Wallace popularized it in his New York Daily News columns. Notre Dame's official colors are gold and navy blue. Green is sometimes worn because of the Fighting Irish nickname.

The Notre Dame Leprechaun is the mascot of the athletic teams. Created by Theodore W. Drake in 1964, the leprechaun was first used on the football pocket schedule and later the football program covers. Time featured it on a November 1964 cover. Since its inception in 2011, Fighting Irish Media (FIM), made up of part-time student workers and full time producers, has filmed nearly all Fighting Irish sporting events for live digital and linear broadcasts. With the installation of a videoboard in Notre Dame Stadium in Fall 2017, FIM has taken over video board production for all Fighting Irish teams. In 2014, the University of Notre Dame and Under Armour reached an agreement whereby the company provides uniforms, apparel, equipment, and monetary compensation to Notre Dame for 10 years. This contract, worth almost $100 million, was the most lucrative in the history of the NCAA at that time. According to some analysts without direct connection to the university or its athletic department, Notre Dame promotes Muscular Christianity through its athletic programs.

=== Football ===
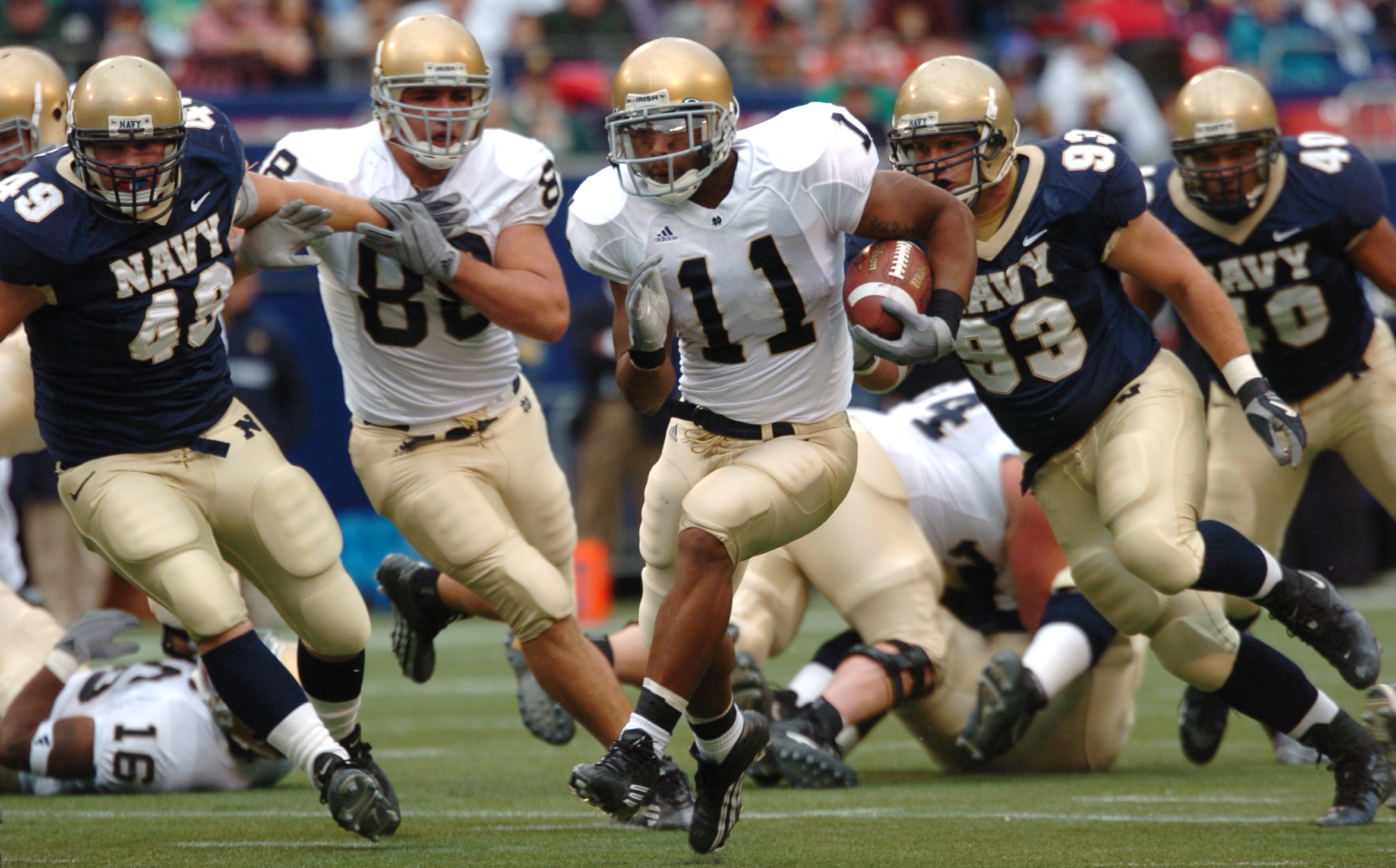
Notre Dame playing against Navy

The Notre Dame football team's history began when the Michigan team brought the game to Notre Dame in 1887 and played against a group of students. Since then, 13 Fighting Irish teams have won consensus national championships (although the university only claims 11), along with another nine teams being named national champions by at least one source. The program has the most members in the College Football Hall of Fame, is tied with Ohio State and Oklahoma for the most Heisman Trophies won by players, and has the 3rd highest winning percentage in NCAA history, behind Ohio State and Alabama. Notre Dame has accumulated many rivals; the annual game against USC for the Jeweled Shillelagh has been described as one of the greatest in college football.

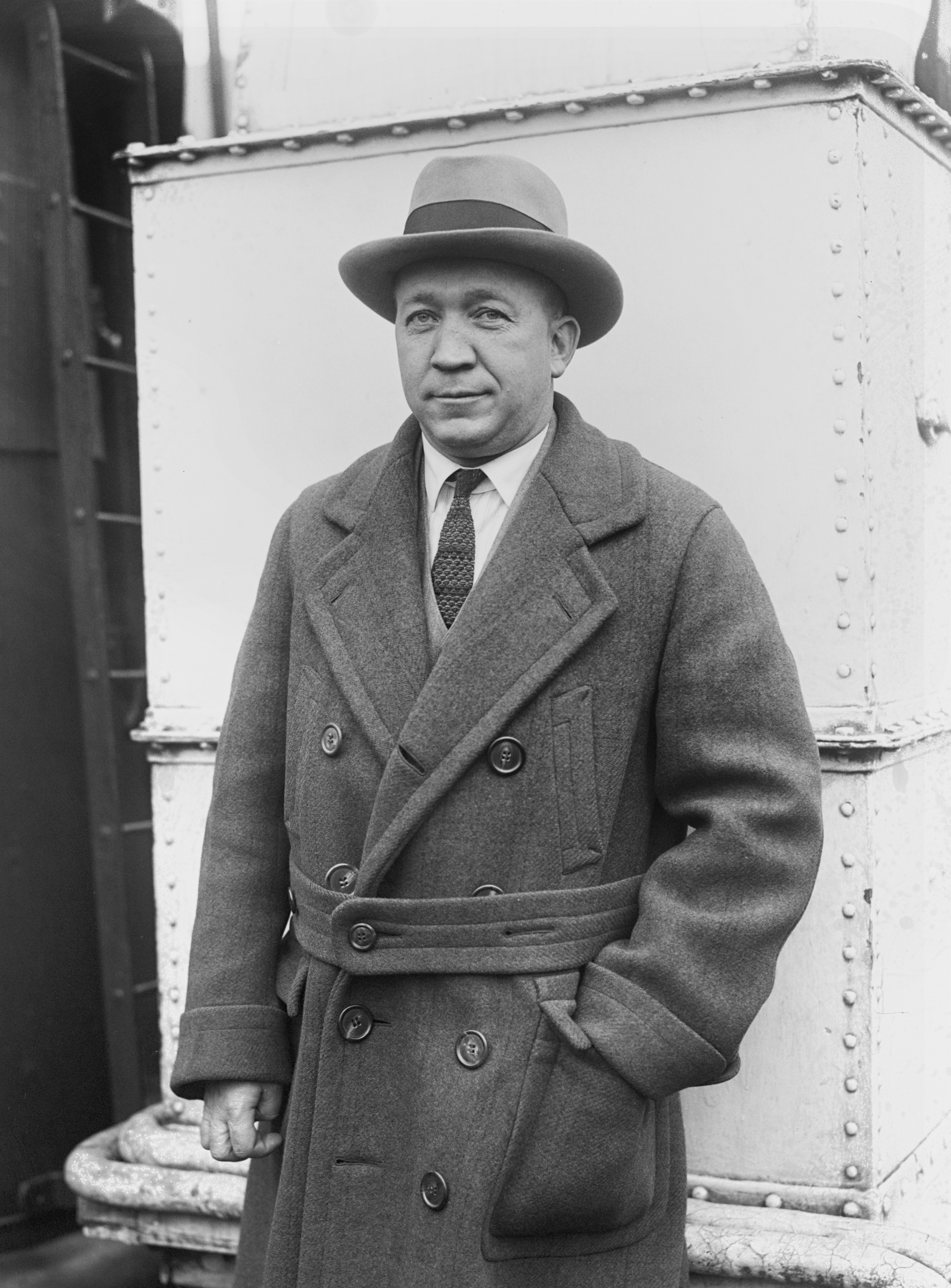
Coach Knute Rockne

George Gipp was the school's legendary football player of the late 1910s. In 1928, coach Knute Rockne used his final conversation with the dying Gipp to inspire the Notre Dame team to beat Army and "win one for the Gipper"; that scene became the climax of the 1940 film Knute Rockne, All American, starring Pat O'Brien as Rockne and Ronald Reagan as Gipp.

The team competes in the 80,795-seat Notre Dame Stadium. The current head coach is Marcus Freeman, who was promoted to head coach after Brian Kelly departed Notre Dame to coach at LSU at the end of the 2021 regular season. Forbes ranked the program college football's eighth most valuable for its average annual revenue of $120 million. It has a TV contract with NBC worth an estimated $15 million per year and one of the country's largest fan bases.

==== Football game-day traditions ====
During home games, activities occur all over campus and dorms decorate their halls with a traditional item (e.g., Zahm Hall's two-story banner). Traditional activities begin at midnight with the Drummers' Circle, involving the Band of the Fighting Irish's drumline beginning the other festivities that will continue the rest of the game day. Later that day, the trumpet section will play the Notre Dame Victory March and the Notre Dame Alma Mater under the dome. The entire band will play a concert at the steps of Bond Hall, then march into the stadium, leading fans and students alike across campus to the game. At the end of each game, the Notre Dame Marching Band plays the alma mater.

Football gameday traditions
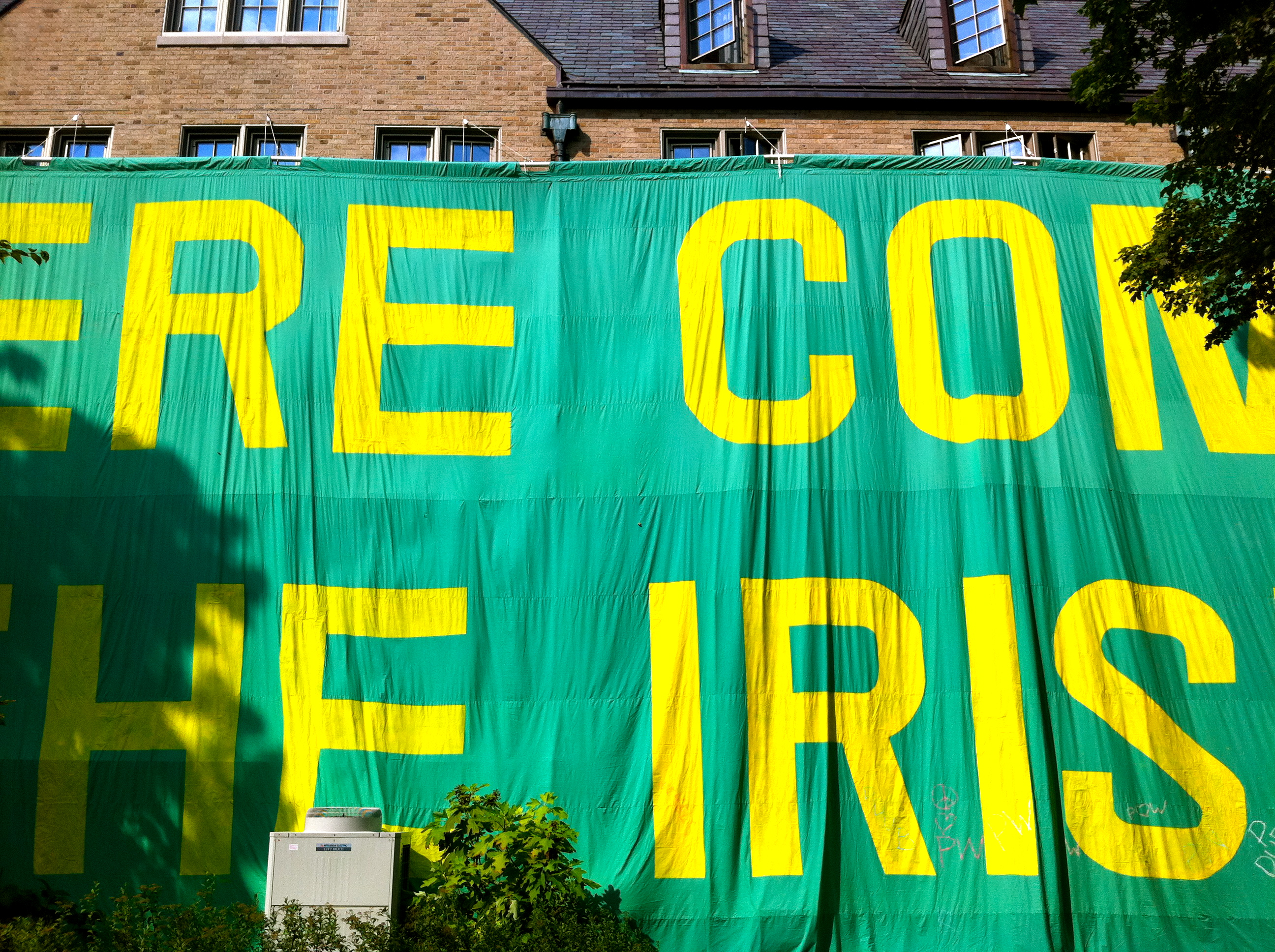
The "Here Come the Irish" gameday sign on Zahm Hall is multiple stories tall

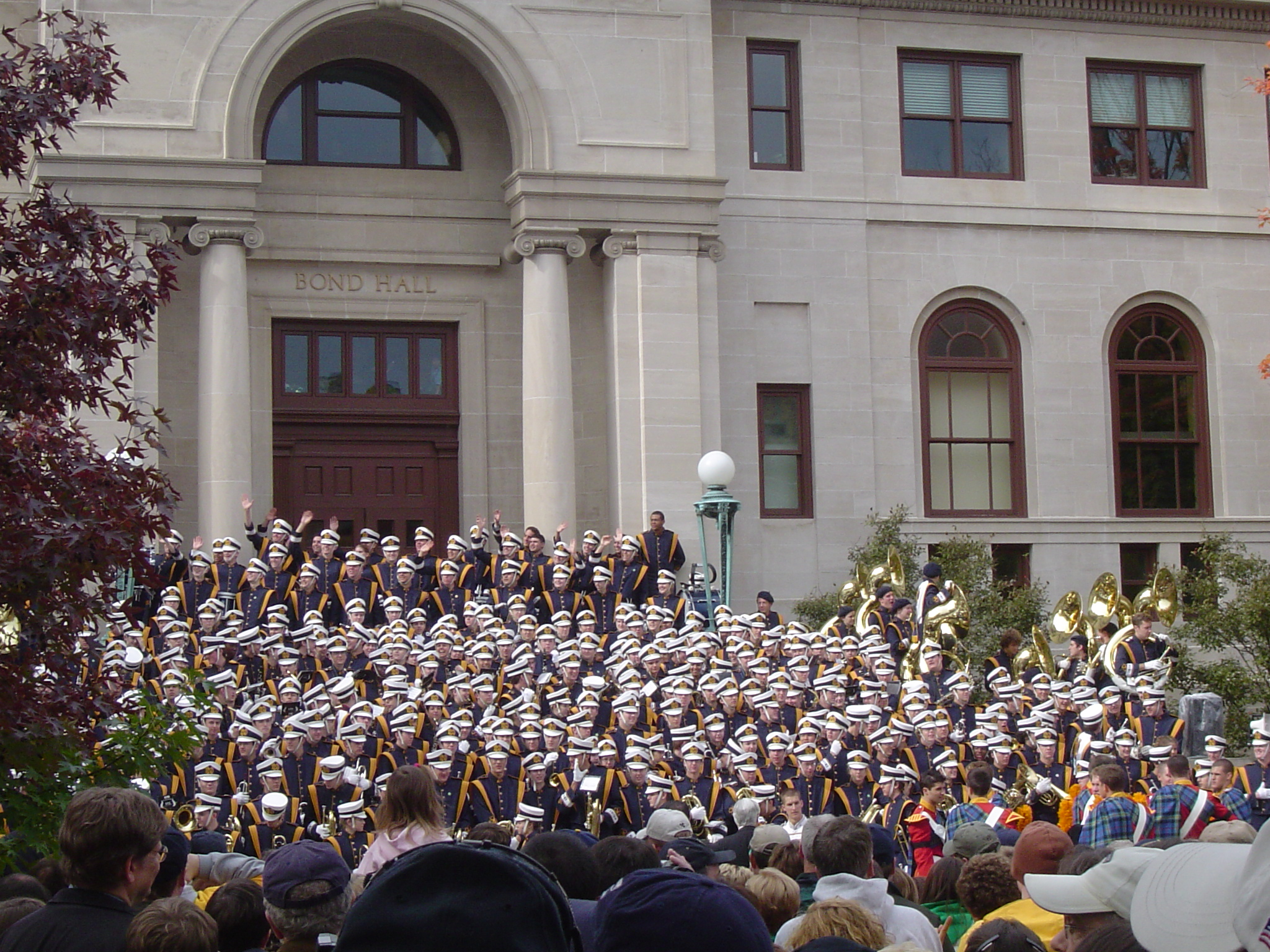
The Band of the Fighting Irish plays on the steps of Bond Hall before every home game

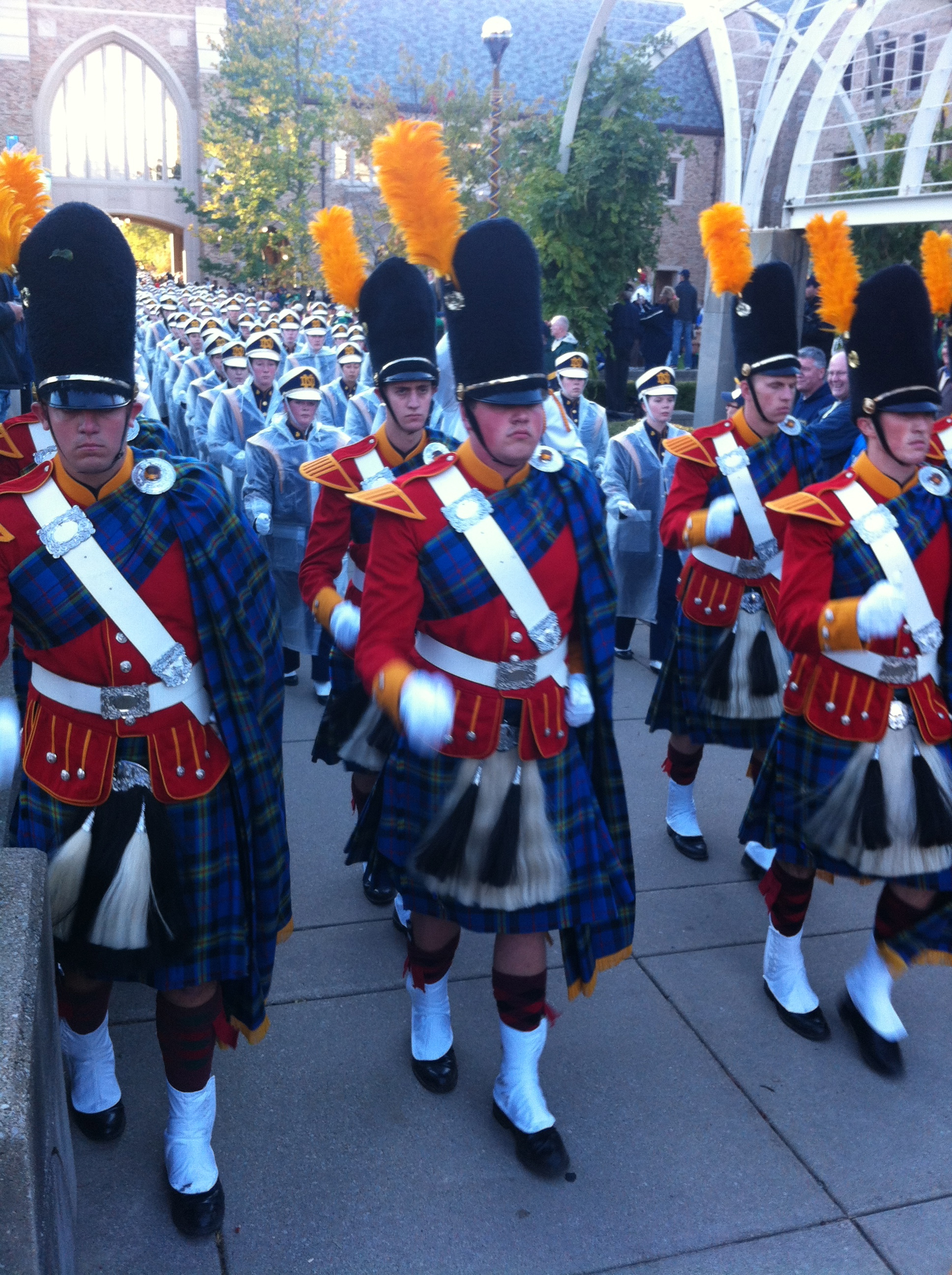
The Irish Guard leading the Band of the Fighting Irish to the stadium

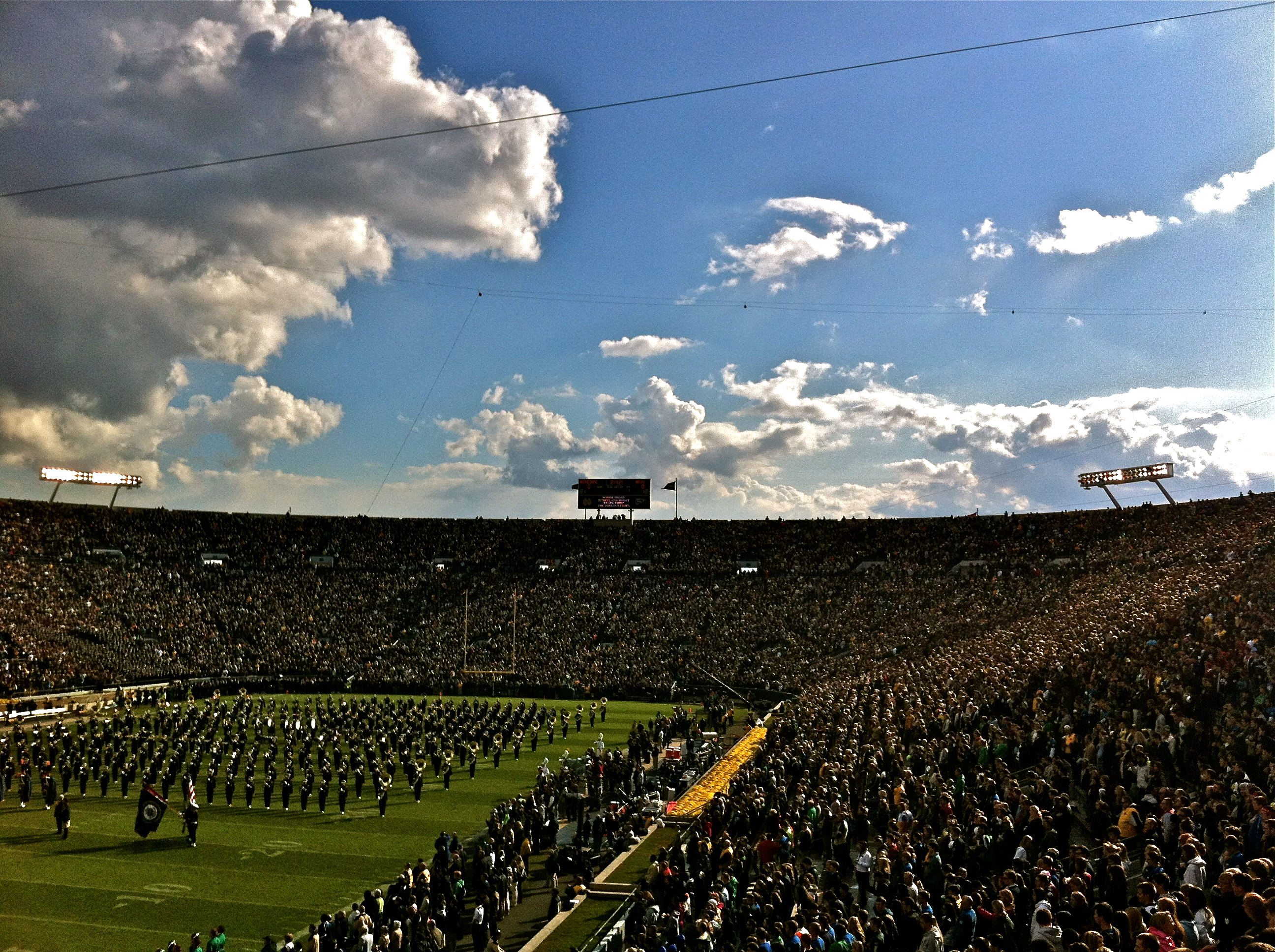
The Band of the Fighting Irish plays inside Notre Dame Stadium.

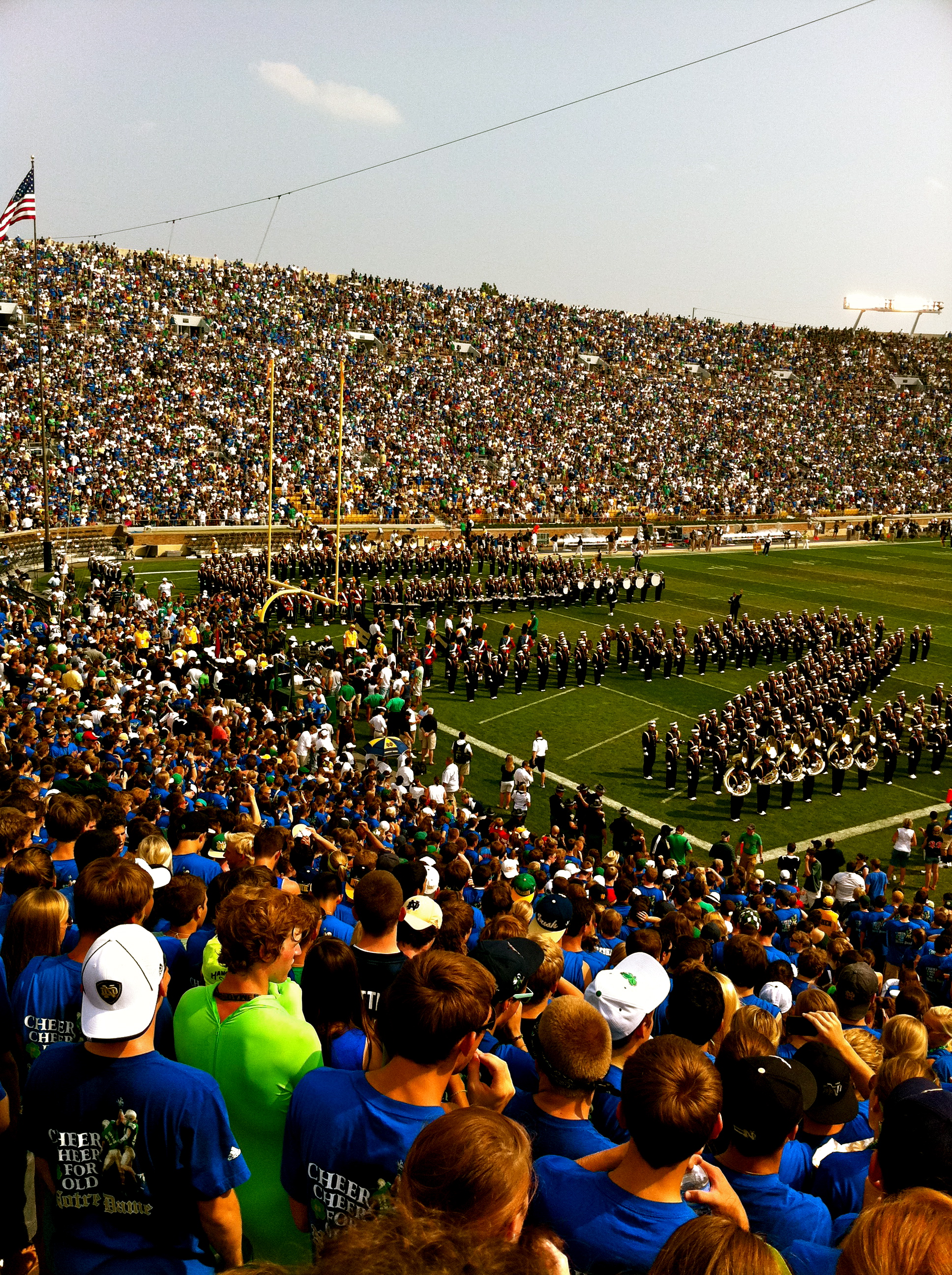
The Band of the Fighting Irish spells out ND through which the Notre Dame Fighting Irish Football Team runs onto the field.

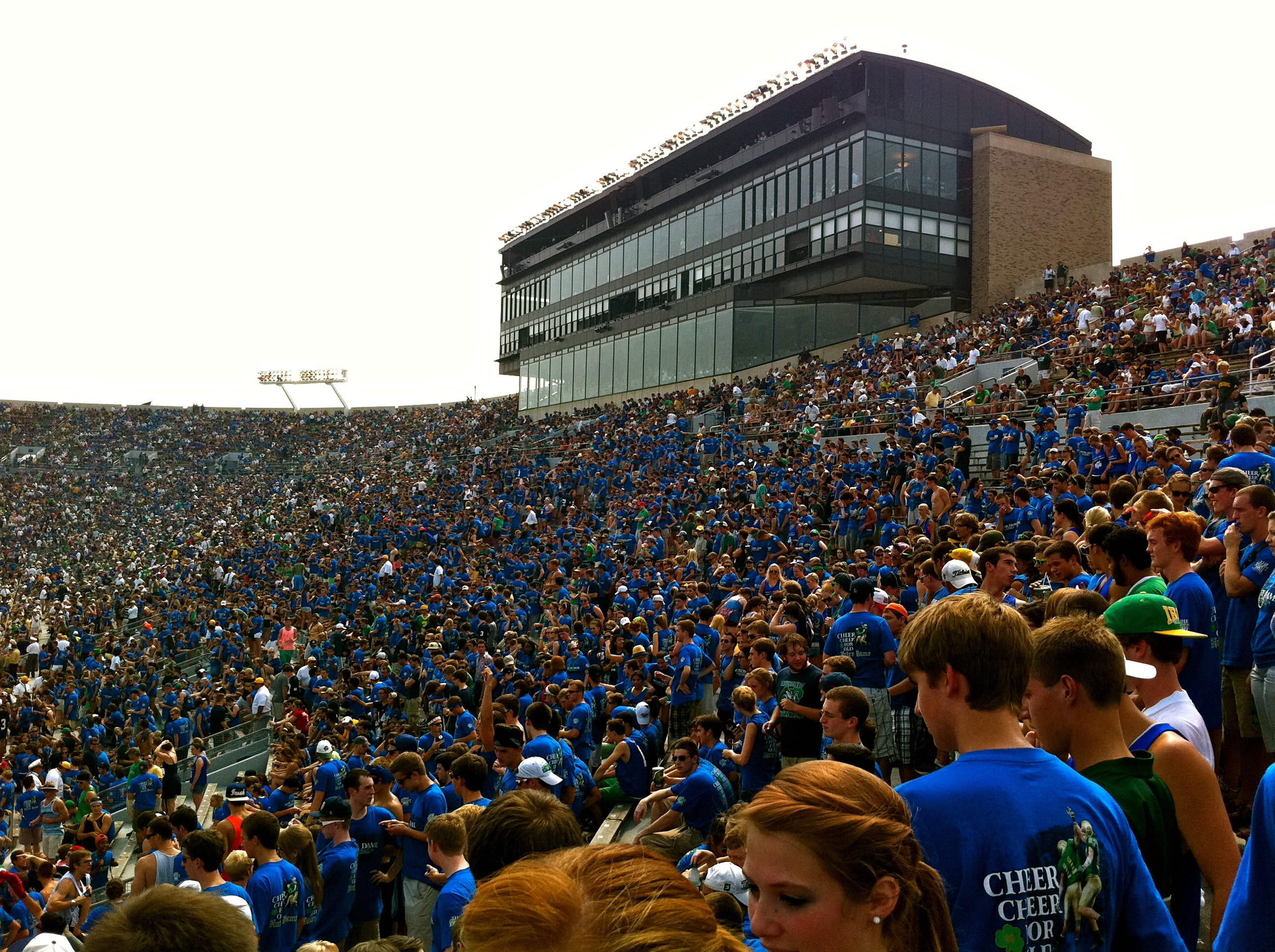
Notre Dame Stadium student section wearing "The Shirt" for the 2011 football season

=== Men's basketball ===
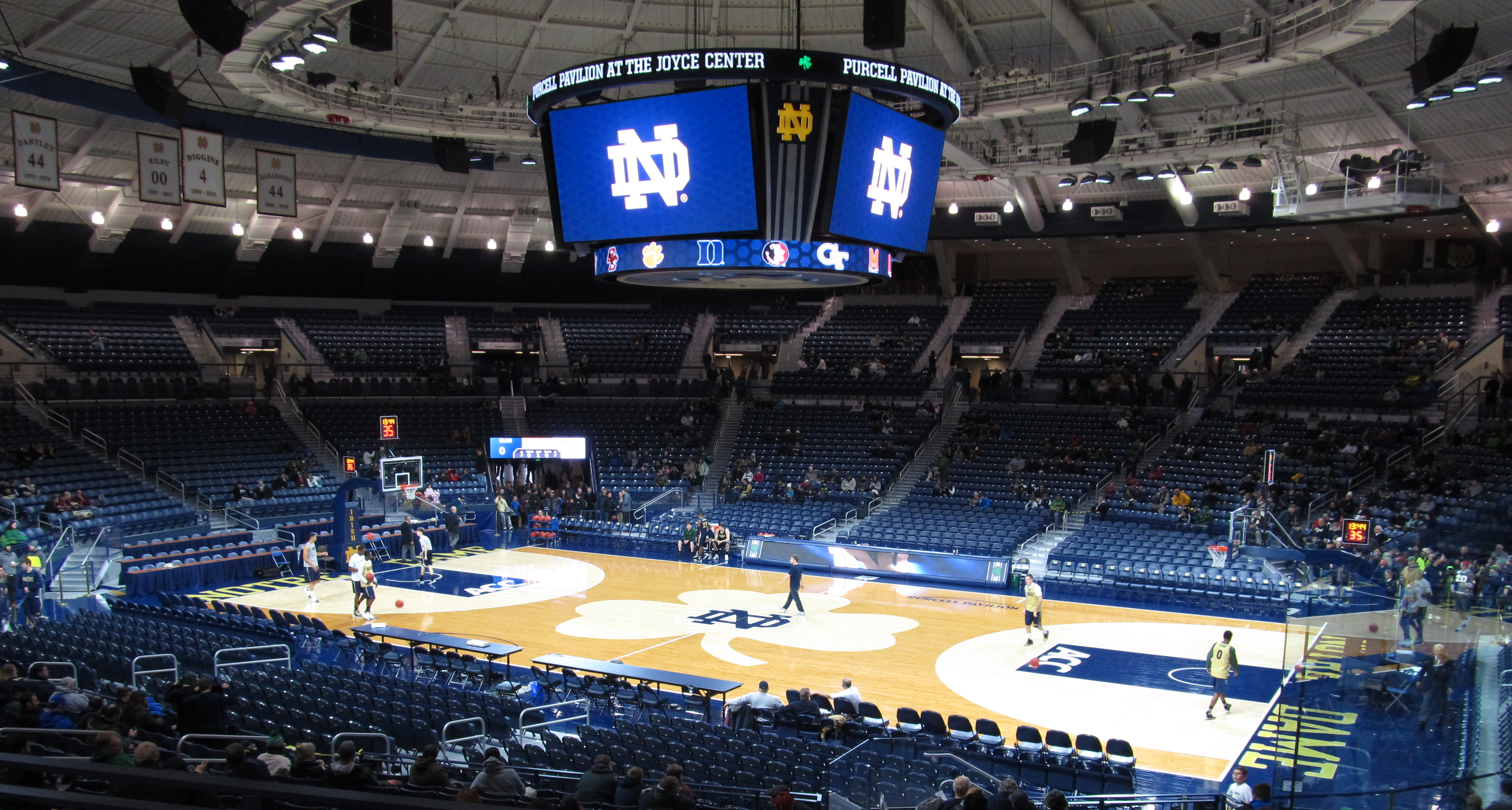
The Joyce Center, home stadium for Notre Dame's basketball teams

As of the 2020–2021 season, the men's basketball team has over 1,910 wins and appeared in 36 NCAA tournaments Former player Austin Carr holds the record for most points scored in a single game of the tournament with 61. Although the team has never won the NCAA Tournament, they were named by the Helms Athletic Foundation as national champions twice. The team has orchestrated a number of upsets of top-ranked teams, the most notable of which was ending UCLA's record 88-game winning streak in 1974. Notre Dame has beaten an additional eight number-one teams, and those nine wins rank second, to UCLA's 10, all-time in wins against the top team.

=== Other sports ===
Notre Dame has won an additional 15 national championships in sports other than football. Four teams have won multiple national championships; the fencing team leads with 10, followed by the men's lacrosse, men's tennis, and women's soccer teams with two each. The men's cross country and golf teams have won one and Notre Dame women's basketball has won two. In the first 10 years that Notre Dame competed in the Big East Conference its teams won a total of 64 championships. As of 2010, the women's swimming and diving team holds the Big East record for consecutive conference championships in any sport with 14 straight conference titles (1997–2010).

=== Band and "Victory March" ===
The Band of the Fighting Irish was formed in 1846 and is the oldest university band in continuous existence. The marching band plays at home games for most sports. It regularly plays the school's fight song, the Notre Dame "Victory March", identified as the most played and most famous fight song by Northern Illinois professor William Studwell. According to College Fight Songs: An Annotated Anthology published in 1998, the "Victory March" is the greatest fight song. It was honored by the National Music Council as a "Landmark of American Music" during the United States Bicentennial. The song is featured in the films Knute Rockne, All American, Airplane! and Rudy.

== Alumni ==
The school has over 130,000 alumni and 275 alumni clubs around the world. Notre Dame is ranked among the universities with strongest alumni networks. Many give the university yearly monetary support. Notre Dame is ranked among schools with the highest alumni donation rates. A school-record of 53.2 percent of alumni donating was set in 2006. Many buildings, including residence halls, on campus are named for major donors. Classroom buildings, and the performing arts center are also named for donors.

Alumni working in politics include state governors, members of the United States Congress, justice of the Supreme Court of the United States Amy Coney Barrett and former United States Secretary of State Condoleezza Rice. Notable alumni from the College of Science are Eric F. Wieschaus, winner of the 1995 Nobel Prize in medicine, and Philip Majerus, discoverer of the cardioprotective effects of aspirin. Many university officials are alumni, including former president John I. Jenkins and current president Robert A. Dowd. Alumni in media include talk show hosts Regis Philbin and Phil Donahue, and television and radio personalities such as Mike Golic and Hannah Storm. A number of sports alumni have continued their careers in professional sports, such as Dave Casper, Joe Theismann, Joe Montana, Tim Brown, Ross Browner, Rocket Ismail, Ruth Riley, Jeff Samardzija, Jerome Bettis, Justin Tuck, Craig Counsell, Skylar Diggins, Brett Lebda, Olympic fencing gold medalist Mariel Zagunis and two-time bronze medalist Nick Itkin, professional boxer Mike Lee, former football coaches such as Charlie Weis, Frank Leahy and Knute Rockne, and Basketball Hall of Famers Austin Carr and Adrian Dantley. Other notable alumni include prominent businessman Edward J. DeBartolo Jr. and astronaut Jim Wetherbee. Two alumni have received the Presidential Medal of Freedom (Alan Page and Edward J. DeBartolo Jr.), and two the Congressional Gold Medal (Thomas Anthony Dooley III and Bill Hanzlik).

== In popular culture ==
The University of Notre Dame is the setting of several works of fiction, as well as the alma mater of some fictional characters. In mid-20th century America, it became "perhaps the most popular symbol of Catholicism" as noted by The Routledge Companion to Religion and Popular Culture:

By combining religion, ethnicity, masculinity, and athletics into a potent mixture of an aggressive and uniquely Catholic gospel of athletics, Notre Dame football became the emblematic program that represented American Catholic self-identity.

=== Film ===
- Knute Rockne, All American is a 1940 biographical film which tells the story of Knute Rockne, Notre Dame football coach.
- The "Win one for the Gipper" speech was parodied in the 1980 film Airplane! when, with the "Victory March" rising to a crescendo in the background, Dr. Rumak (played by Leslie Nielsen) urged reluctant pilot Ted Striker (played by Robert Hays) to "win just one for the Zipper", Striker's war buddy George Zipp. The "Victory March" also plays during the film's credits.
- Rudy is a 1993 account of the life of Daniel "Rudy" Ruettiger, who harbored dreams of playing football at Notre Dame despite significant obstacles.

=== Television ===
- President Josiah Bartlet from the show The West Wing is a Notre Dame graduate and First Lady Abigail Bartlet attended Saint Mary's College. Danny Concannon, a member of the White House press corps, is also a graduate of Notre Dame. Actor Martin Sheen specifically asked that his character be a Notre Dame alumnus due to the Catholicism shared by both the actor and the character.

=== Other media ===
- One of the music videos for the song "This Too Shall Pass" by OK Go was created in collaboration with the University of Notre Dame Marching Band and was shot on the university campus.

== See also ==
- Notre Dame Shakespeare Festival, held on campus every summer

== Bibliography ==
- O'Connell, Marvin R. (2001). Edward Sorin. Notre Dame, IN: University of Notre Dame Press. ISBN 978-0-268-02759-9.
- Sperber, Murray A. (2002) [1993]. Shake down the Thunder: The Creation of Notre Dame Football. Indiana University Press. ISBN 978-0-253-21568-0.
