= History of the University of Notre Dame =

University of Notre Dame seal

The University of Notre Dame was founded on November 26, 1842, by Father Edward Sorin, CSC, who was also its first president, as an all-male institution on land donated by the Bishop of Vincennes. Today, many Holy Cross priests continue to work for the university, including as its president. Notre Dame rose to national prominence in the early 1900s for its Fighting Irish football team, especially under the guidance of the legendary coach Knute Rockne. Major improvements to the university occurred during the administration of Rev. Theodore Hesburgh between 1952 and 1987 as Hesburgh's administration greatly increased the university's resources, academic programs, and reputation and first enrolled women undergraduates in 1972.

== Foundation ==
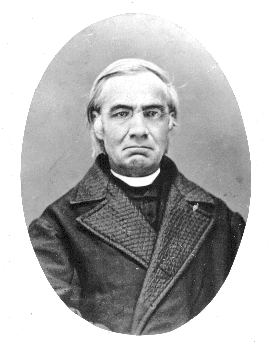
Father Edward Sorin, C.S.C., founder

In 1839, the bishop of Vincennes, Right Rev. Célestine Guynemer de la Hailandière, had contacted Rev. Basil Moreau, C.S.C., founder of the Congregation of Holy Cross, and expressed to him his concern over the lack of Catholic education in his diocese and pleaded for Moreau to send him a priest and four brothers to set up a school. When enough funds were raised, Moreau chose a young and energetic priest Rev. Edward Sorin to lead the effort. Accompanied by six brothers, Fr. Sorin left Le Havre, France on August 8, 1841, on the ship the Iowa, and arrived in New York on September 13, 1841, where they were met by Samuel Byerley, a merchant of New York, on the request of Bishop de la Hailandiere; the party was also hosted by Bishop John Dubois. On the third day, they set out for Indiana. They passed through Albany and in Buffalo they took a ferry though Lake Erie and reached Toledo, Ohio, and reached Bishop Hailandière in Vincennes on October 8. Bishop De la Hailandiere gave Sorin and his brothers possession of the church of St Peter and its annexed farm in Montgomery, Indiana. The lack of funds and the harsh winter made life in the farm difficult, especially since the men were all French and not experts in American farming; the situation was made worse by the tense relationship between Fr. Sorin and Bishop Hailandière, who often disagreed on financial issues.

In the early months of 1842, Fr. Sorin started to conceive the idea of founding a college, although one was already present in Vincennes (the College of St. Gabriel, which failed soon after). Initially, Fr. Sorin thought of founding the college there in St Peters, but he met the opposition of the bishop who lamented that this was not in the original plans and it conflicted with the existence of St. Gabriel's college. However, the bishops also stated that he was not against a founding of a college elsewhere, provided that this effort would not prevent him his Brothers from accomplishing their education duties. Near the end of October the bishop offered Sorin certain lands at the furthermost limits of the diocese, in the virtually unsettled area of northern Indiana, just a few miles from the southern boundary of the state of Michigan.

These 524 acres of land had been bought between 1830 and 1832 by Rev. Stephen Badin, the first priest ordained on the United States. He had come to the area in 1830 invited by chief Leopold Pokagon to administer the mission of St. Maries des Lacs to the Potawatomi tribe. Pokagon had been baptized with his son in 1830 by Father Frederick Reze with his son. Badin, who bought the land from the government and two private landowners, was joined in 1833 by Father Louis Deseille, and the two ministered the Potawatomi community. Father Deseille baptized Chief Menominee on August 24, 1834, and expanded the mission to the Yellow River village at Twin Lakes in 1834. These two communities were at the heart of the regional resistance to removal in the 1830s. In 1836 Badin sold the land to Simon Bruté and left the mission to Deseille, but the latter soon died and was replaced by Benjamin Petit. Petit was also opposed to removal and joined the Potawatomi in the Trail of Death in 1838, a forced march through Illinois and Missouri, into Kansas. Father Petit died soon after, severely ill from the march. With the departure of the Potawatomi and the death of Petit, the land reverted to the bishop, who then in 1840 offered it to the Father of Mercy Ferdinand Bach, with the hope he could fulfill Badin's stipulation that a college be built. Bach acquired another 375 acres of land, but then decided he could not undertake the project and returned everything to the bishop. Hence, in 1842 the bishop offered the 524 acres to Sorin (later he would give them the rest).

After some deliberation with the brothers, Father Sorin accepted the land and the challenge, on the bishop's condition that he would found a college in two years.

=== Arrival at Notre Dame ===
On November 16, Rev. Edward Sorin traveled to the chosen site with seven Holy Cross brothers. The rest of the community stayed in St Peters to continue the educational effort under the guide of Brother Vincent and a local priest, Fr. Chartier, as promised to the bishop. Of these seven brothers, only two had originally come from France with Sorin, Brothers Marie (Francis Xavier) and Gratian (Urban Mosimer). The other five had joined the community since its arrival at St. Peter's; these were Brothers Patrick (Michael Connelly), William, Basil (John O'Sullivan), Peter (James Tully) and the French Brother Francis (Michael Disser). On the afternoon of November 26, 1842, Sorin arrived South Bend (at the time just a small village) where he reached the home of Alexis Coquillard, a French-American trapper who had been the first permanent white settler in the area and who was known to Bishop de la Hailandiere. That very afternoon Rev. Sorin and the Brothers went to investigate the lands they were given, and found them mantled with snow, softening and mellowing the harshness of the bare winter-frozen forest. The only buildings on campus was Rev. Stephen Badin's old Log Chapel, which had until then used as an Indian mission and a church for local Catholics, the house of the Indian interpreter Charron and his wife, and a shed.

Rev. Sorin described his arrival on campus in a letter filled with joy and hope to the Superior General Rev. Basil Moreau, C.S.C.

Everything was frozen, and yet it all appeared so beautiful. The lake, particularly, with its mantle of snow, resplendent in its whiteness, was to us a symbol of the stainless purity of Our August Lady, whose name it bears; and also of the purity of soul which should characterize the new inhabitants of these beautiful shores. Our lodgings appeared to us-as indeed they are-but little different from those at St. Peter's. We made haste to inspect all the various sites on the banks of the lake which had been so highly praised. Yes, like little children, in spite of the cold, we went from one extremity to the other, perfectly enchanted with the marvelous beauties of our new abode. Oh! may this new Eden be ever the home of innocence and virtue!

— Rev. Edward Sorin, C.S.C., Circular Letters, Part II, No 1

The next day, November 27, they took formal possession of the site; this led to the confusion on the exact day of the founding of Notre Dame, whether November 26 or the 27th. Both dates were referenced as the official foundation date in later documents, and the confusion remains.

== Early history ==
The task that Rev. Sorin and his Brothers had in front of them was not easy: with little money (about $370) they had to administer both to the local Indian tribes (since they inherited the mission with the land) and to the local white Catholics (who were an underrepresented minority in a largely Protestant area), and at the same time found a college in two years. At the time, St. Joseph County was small (around 6,500 to 7,500 persons) and largely unsettled, with South Bend barely reaching 1000 inhabitants; although in the following years it would experience substantial growth. There were about twenty Catholic families, but no Catholic churches in the area, and anti-Catholic sentiment was spread among the populace.

Sorin and his seven brothers (three French and four Irish) traveled 250 miles north in one of Indiana's harshest winters. They followed the Wabash river, passing by Terre Haute. They split, and Sorin with the first group arrived in South Bend on the afternoon of November 26, 1842. Here they were welcomed by Alexis Coquillard (who bishop Hailandière had put them in contact with) and then undertook the two-mile trip to visit the property before spending the night guests of Coquillard. The next day they visited the site with day-light, and took formal possession of the property.

At the time, the property only had three buildings: a log chapel built by Stephen Badin (the original burned down in 1856 but a replica was built in 1906), a small two-story clapboard building that was the home of the Potawatomi interpreter Charon, and a small shed. Of the 524 acres, only 10 was cleared and ready for cultivation, but Sorin stated that the soil was suitable for raising wheat and corn. While the land had two small lakes, the snow and marshy area might have given to Sorin the appearance of a single larger lake, hence why named the fledgling mission “Notre Dame du Lac” (Our Lady of the Lake). The most immediate concern were suitable and warm lodgings for the Sorin and the seven brothers present and for those in St. Peter's who were yet to come north. To build a second log cabin, and lacking the funds, they appealed to the people of South Bend to donate funds or their time. Thanks to the help from the locals, they were able to assemble the timber and erect the walls, and the Sorin and the brothers erected the roof and completed the cabin on March 19, 1843.

Sorin dedicated himself to building a college proper, since the foundation of such within two years was the condition on which he had been given the land by bishop Hailandière. While in Vincennes, Sorin had made plans with a local architect, Mr. Marsile, to have him come in the summer and start construction of a main building, but the architect did not show up. Hence, Sorin and the brothers constructed Old College, a two-story brick building that served as dormitory, bakery, and classrooms. This building was instrumental in accommodating the growing community. Indeed, in February 1843, Brother Vincent, Lawrence, Koachim, and eight novices arrived from St. Peter's to Notre Dame. In the summer of 1843, more members of the Congregation arrived from France: Fathers Francis Cointet and Theophile Maurivalt, Brother Eloi (Jean-Marie Leray), seminarian François Gouesse, and Sisters Mary of the Heart of Jesus (Marie Savary), Mary of Bethlehem (Marie Desneux), Mary of Calvary (Marie Robineau), and Mary of Nazareth (Marie Chauvin). Badin's log chapel was hence converted into a carpenter's shed and residence for the Brothers, while the 1843 cabin served as chapel and sister's residence. Sorin also constructed a makeshift wooden novitiate for the Brothers on "The Island" (the stretch of land between the two lakes, now site of Columba Hall), but the novitiate was soon moved to Indianapolis on the insistence of the bishop.

With Old College ready, the college officially opened to its first five students in the fall of 1843, with seven more arriving in the next months. Sorin based the school around the French collège model, which combined two years of high school and four years of college. The early curriculum focused mostly on reading, writing, arithmetic, history and geography, but more sophisticated topics like Latin, Greek, French, mathematics, oratory, botany, drawing, music, and zoology were also taught. Tuition was $100 per year for full-time students, $20 a year for day students, with additional fees for the more advanced topics. Among the first residents to receive an education at Notre Dame were orphans, who came from a home established by the Brothers of Saint Joseph to educate children beyond the ages of 12 and 13, and who dedicated themselves mostly to learning manual trades such as carpentering and farming from the Brothers. By the 1844–1845 academic year, forty students were in attendance, although it is likely that a number did not attend for long, and only about 25 were consistently registered.

When the architect Marsile finally arrived in August 1843, Sorin proceeded to erect the first Main Building (at the location of the third and present Main Building) with a loan supplied by Samuel Byerley. The building, completed in 1844 and enlarged in 1853, constituted the entire college until the construction of the second and larger Main Building in 1865.

Notre Dame began as a primary and secondary school, but soon received its official college charter from the Indiana General Assembly on January 15, 1844. Under the charter the school was officially named the University of Notre Dame du Lac, which means University of Our Lady of the Lake. Although the university was originally only for male students, the female-only Saint Mary's College was founded by the Sisters of the Holy Cross near Notre Dame in 1844. More students attended the college and the first degrees were awarded in 1849. Additionally, the university was expanded with new buildings allowing more students and faculty to live, study, and eat at the university.

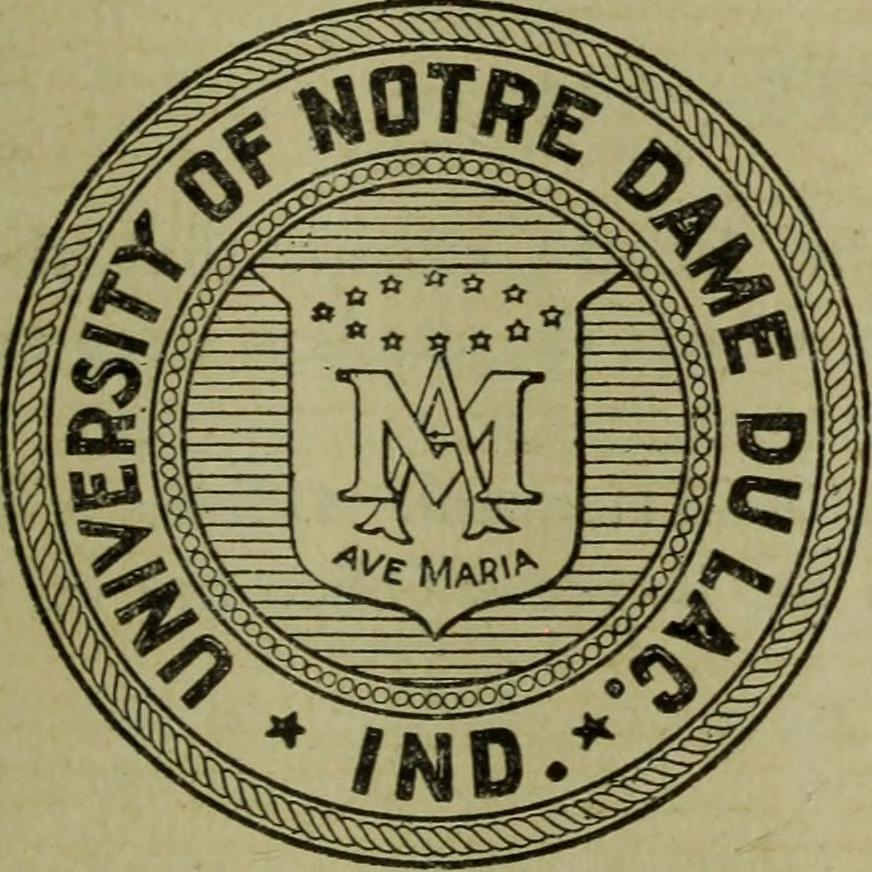
The second seal of the University of Notre Dame (1876–1901)

During the early years, Notre Dame faced many hardships. Fires were relatively common and often disastrous. In 1849, the Manual Labor School was completely destroyed. In 1855, the original log cabins (the one built by Fr. Badin and the one built by Fr. Sorin in 1843), which were then being used as stables, burned and the farm equipment and storehouse were destroyed. In the 19th century, a stream drained excess water from Saint Mary's Lake into the Saint Joseph River. A farmer who owned the adjoining property built a dam to power a mill, and this backed up water onto the land around and between the Notre Dame lakes and created a swampland, perfect for breeding flies and mosquitoes. Rev. Sorin became convinced that the swamp was the source of malaria, cholera and typhus outbreaks that afflicted the college. In 1855, following another two disease fatalities, Sorin convinced the farmer to sell him the land with the dammed stream, but the farmer hastily left town before completing the transaction. Enraged, Sorin sent a half-dozen of his strongest religious brothers to demolish the dam by hand. The farmer quickly sealed the deal under the original agreed-upon terms. The marsh was drained, the land dried up, and the diseases disappeared.

In 1857, Rev. Basil Moreau, founder and Superior General of the Congregation of Holy Cross, made his only visit to the University of Notre Dame and Saint Mary's College. With each new president, new academic programs were offered and new buildings were built to accommodate these programs. The original Main Building built by Fr. Sorin just after he arrived was replaced by a larger "Main Building" in 1865, which housed the university's administration, classrooms, and dormitories. Beginning in 1873, a library collection was started by Father Lemonnier. By 1879, it had grown to ten thousand volumes that were housed in the Main Building.

The charter was amended by the Indiana General Assembly on March 8, 1873.

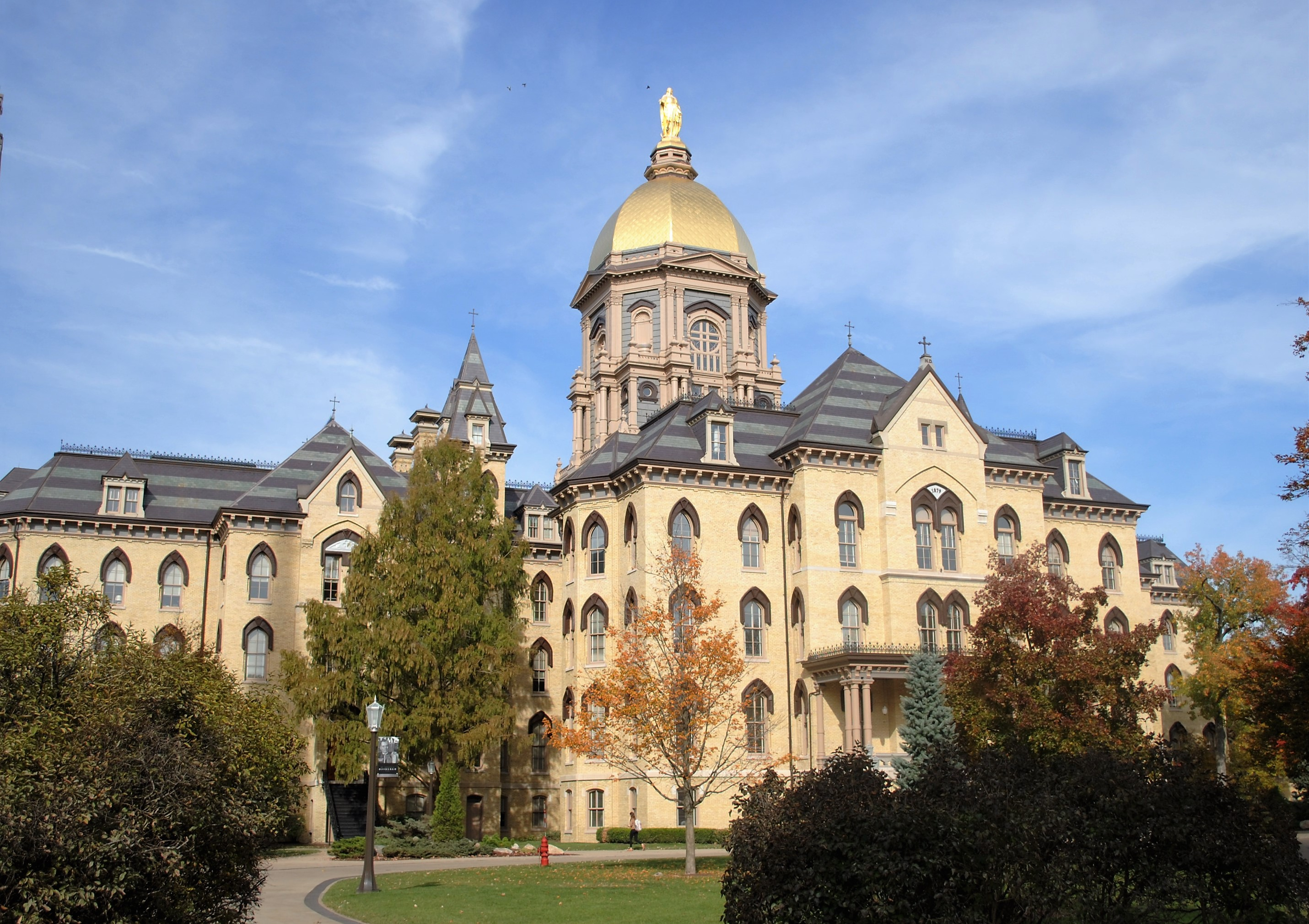
The third main building, built in 1879 following the fire

=== Great Fire of 1879 ===
The entire Main Building with its library collection was destroyed by a fire on April 23, 1879, but the nearby church was spared. The school closed immediately and students were sent home. The library collection was also rebuilt and stayed housed in the new Main Building for years afterwards. Around the time of the fire, a Music Hall was opened. Eventually becoming known as Washington Hall, it hosted plays and musical acts put on by the school. Following the pledge made by William Corby, C.S.C., then the university's president, that Notre Dame would reopen for the fall term, Father Sorin willed Notre Dame to rebuild and continue its growth. As recounted in Notre Dame: 100 Years (1942), "The sixty-five year old man walked around the ruins, and those who followed him were confounded by his attitude. Instead of bending, he stiffened. There was on his face a look of grim determination. He signaled all of them to go into the church with him."

== Growth ==
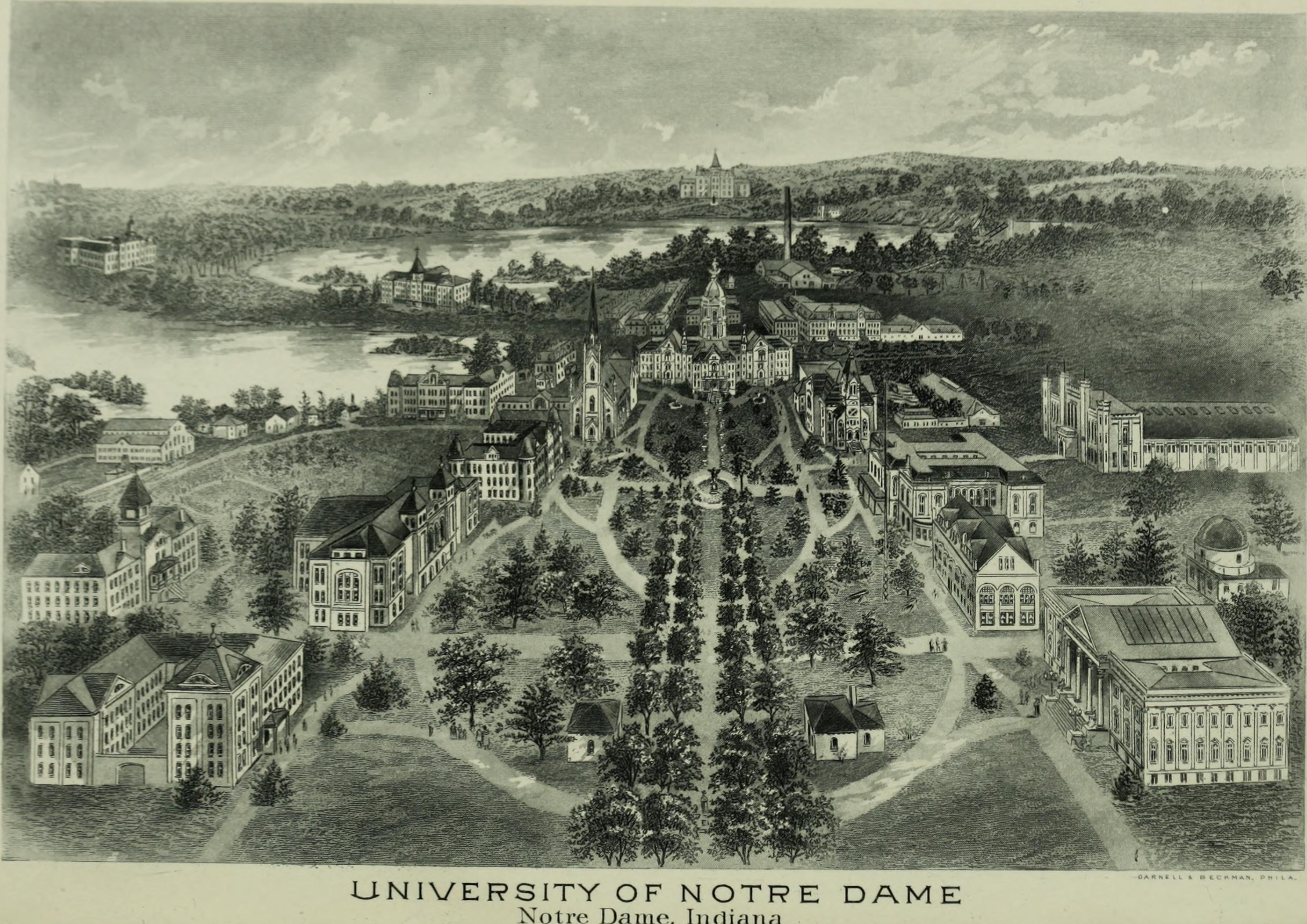
Campus in 1903

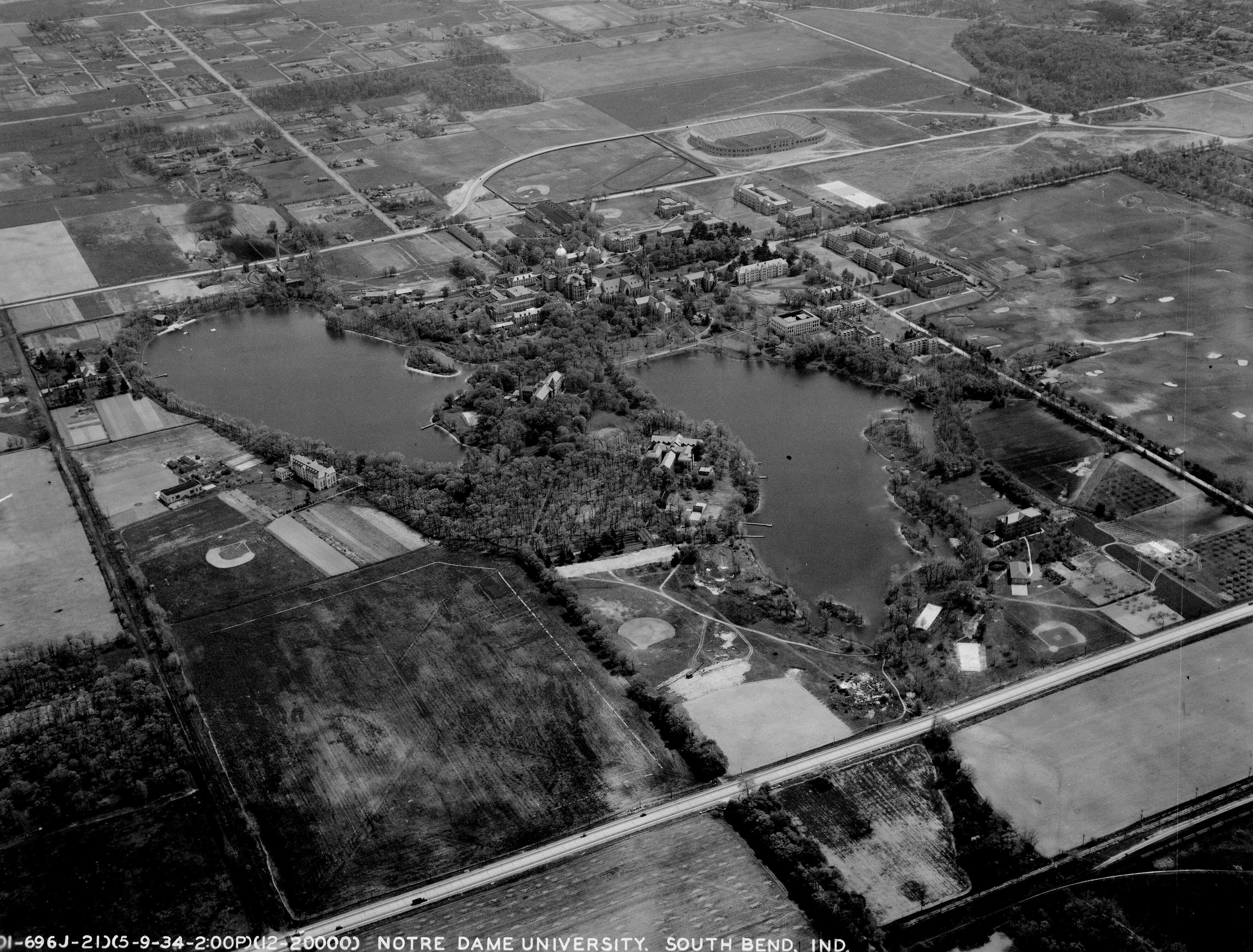
Campus in 1934

The presidency of Thomas E. Walsh (1881–1893) was focused on improving Notre Dame's scholastic reputation and standards. At the time, many students came to Notre Dame for its business courses only, and did not graduate. He started a "Belles Lettres" program, invited many notable lay intellectuals such as Maurice Francis Egan to campus. Washington Hall was built in 1881 as a theater, and the Science Hall (today LaFortune Student Center) was built in 1883 to house the science program (established in 1880) and multiple classrooms and science labs. The construction of Sorin Hall saw the first freestanding residence hall on campus and one of the first in the country to have private rooms for students, a project championed by Sorin and John Zahm. During Walsh's tenure, Notre Dame started its football program and awarded the first Laetare Medal. The Law School, which had been founded in 1869, was reorganized under the leadership of William J. Hoynes (dean from 1883 to 1919) and when its new building was opened shortly after his retirement it was renamed in Hoynes' honor.

Rev. John Zahm was the Holy Cross Provincial for the United States from 1898 to 1906, with overall supervision of the university. He sought to modernize and expand Notre Dame by erecting buildings and adding to the campus art gallery and library, amassing what became a famous Dante collection, and pushing Notre Dame towards becoming a research university dedicated to scholarship. The congregation did not renew Zahm's term because of fears he had expanded Notre Dame too quickly and had run the order into serious debt. In particular, his vision to make Notre Dame a research university was at odds with that of Andrew Morrissey (president from 1893 to 1905), who hoped to keep the institution a smaller boarding school. Morrissey's presidency remained largely focused on younger students and saw the construction of the Grotto, the addition of wings to Sorin Hall, and the erection of the first gymnasium. By 1900, student enrollment increased to more than 700, with most students still following the Commercial Course.

Irish writer W. B. Yeats stopped at Notre Dame during his tour of America between 1903 and 1904. At Notre Dame, he learned about the student production of Oedipus Rex in Washington Hall. Upon returning to Ireland in 1904, Yeats wrote about his tour in Samhain, praising the artistic freedom found at Notre Dame and noting that performances of Oedipus Rex were banned in London due to what Yeats derisively referred to "British puritanism". Yeats also favorably contrasted views on Catholicism at Notre Dame with those found in his native Ireland. He made several attempts to stage Oedipus Rex in Dublin, but all his efforts came to nothing.

The movement towards a research university was subsequently championed by John W. Cavanaugh, who modernized educational standards. An intellectual figure known for his literary gifts and his eloquent speeches, he dedicated himself to the school's academic reputation and to increasing number of students awarded bachelor's and master's degrees. As part of his efforts, he attracted a number of eminent scholars, established a chair in journalism, and introduced courses in chemical engineering. During his time as president, Notre Dame also rapidly became a significant force on the football field. In 1917, Notre Dame awarded its first degree to a woman, and its first bachelor's in 1922. However, female undergraduates did not become common until 1972. James A. Burns became president in 1919 and, following in the footsteps of Cavanaugh, in three years he produced an academic revolution that brought the school up to national standards by adopting the elective system and moving away from the traditional scholastic and classical emphasis. By contrast, the Jesuit colleges, bastions of academic conservatism, were reluctant to move to a system of electives; for this reason, their graduates were shut out of Harvard Law School. Notre Dame continued to grow over the years, adding more colleges, programs, residence halls, and sports teams. By 1921, with the addition of the College of Commerce, Notre Dame had grown from a small college to a university with five colleges and a law school.

On October 15, 1919, Éamon de Valera arrived on campus of the University of Notre Dame in Indiana. After a warm welcome by the student body, he lay a wreath under statue of the Irish Rev. William Corby and planted a tree in honor of his visit, and toured the university archives where he saw the sword of Thomas Francis Meagher and the flag of the Irish Brigade. He then spoke in Washington Hall about the cause of Ireland in front of twelve hundred students. His address was followed by an impressive ovation and De Valera stated that "It was the happiest day since coming to America."

== Between the two wars ==
Notre Dame continued to grow over the years adding more colleges, programs, and even sports teams. By 1921, with the addition of the College of Commerce, Notre Dame had grown from a small college to a university with five colleges and a professional law school. The university continued to expand and add new residence halls and buildings with each subsequent president.

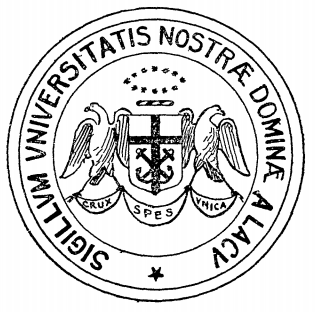
Third Seal of the University of Notre Dame (1901–1930)

=== Knute Rockne and the football team ===
Knute Rockne became head coach in 1918. Under Rockne, the Irish would post a record of 105 wins, 12 losses, and five ties. During his 13 years, the Irish won three national championships, had five undefeated seasons, won the Rose Bowl in 1925, and produced players such as George Gipp and the "Four Horsemen". Knute Rockne has the highest winning percentage (.881) in NCAA Division I/FBS football history. Rockne's offenses employed the Notre Dame Box and his defenses ran a 7–2–2 scheme. The last game Rockne coached was on December 14, 1930, when he led a group of Notre Dame all-stars against the New York Giants in New York City. The game raised funds for the Mayor's Relief Committee for the Unemployed and Needy of the city. 50,000 fans turned out to see the reunited "Four Horsemen" along with players from Rockne's other championship teams take the field against the pros.

The success of Notre Dame reflected the rising status of Irish Americans and Catholics in the 1920s. Catholics rallied around the team and listened to the games on the radio, especially when it defeated teams from schools that symbolized the Protestant establishment in America—Harvard, Yale, Princeton, and Army. Its role as a high-profile flagship institution of Catholicism made it an easy target of anti-Catholicism. The most remarkable episode of violence was a clash between Notre Dame students and the Ku Klux Klan (KKK), a white supremacist and anti-Catholic movement, in 1924. The Klan decided to have a week-long Klavern in South Bend. Clashes with the student body started on May 17, when students blocked the Klansmen from descending from their trains in the South Bend station and ripped the KKK clothes and regalia. Two days later, thousands of students massed downtown protesting the Klavern, and only the arrival of college president Walsh prevented any further clashes. The next day, Rockne spoke at a campus rally and implored the students to obey Walsh and refrain from further violence. A few days later, the Klavern broke up, but the hostility shown by the students contributed to the downfall of the KKK in Indiana.

=== Presidents O'Hara and Cavanaugh ===
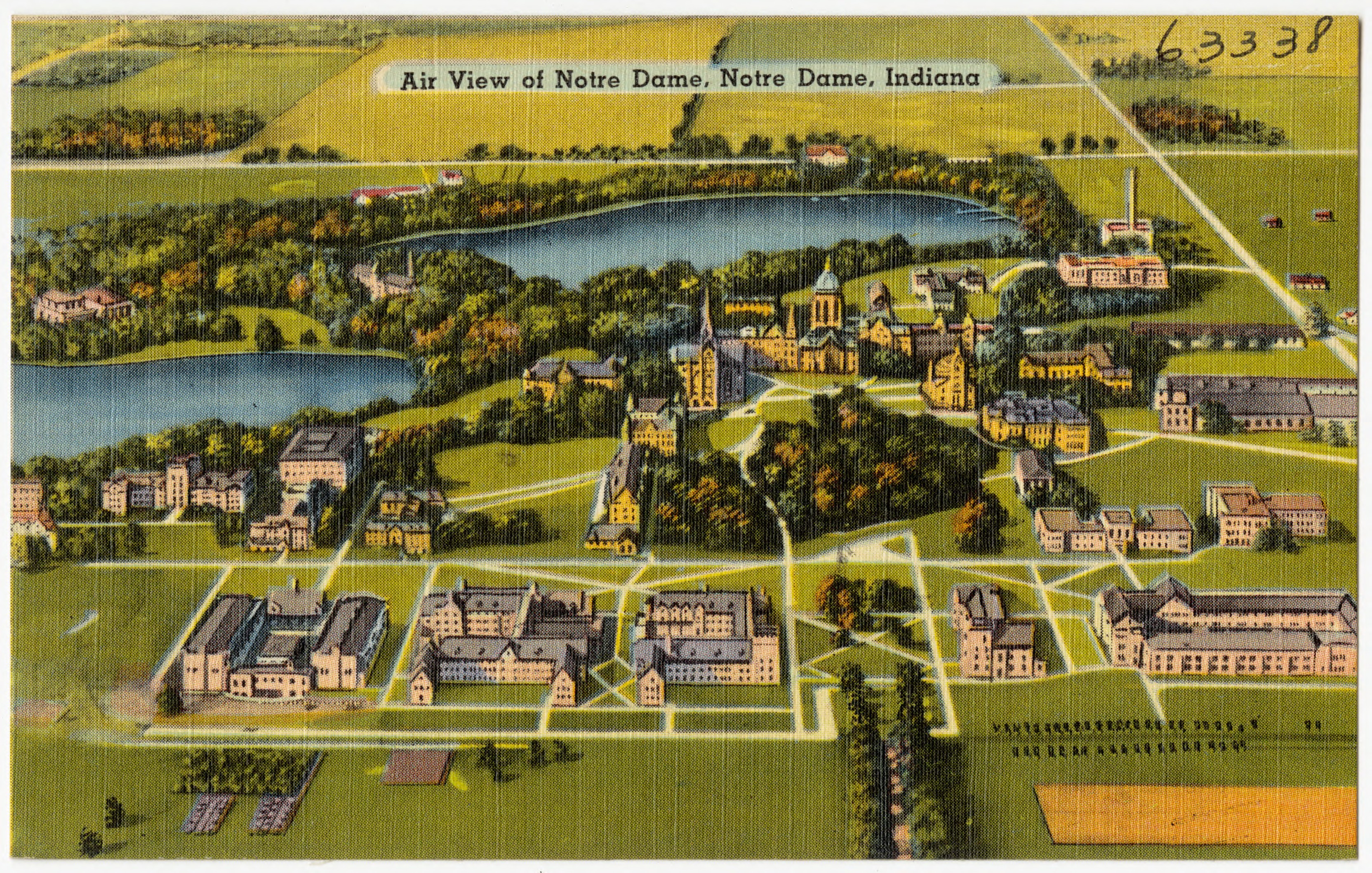
Campus between 1930 and 1945 circa

Charles L. O'Donnell (1928–1934) and John Francis O'Hara (1934–1939) fueled both material and academic expansion. During their tenures at Notre Dame, they brought numerous refugees and intellectuals to campus; such as W. B. Yeats, Frank H. Spearman, Jeremiah D. M. Ford, Irvin Abell, and Josephine Brownson for the Laetare Medal, instituted in 1883. O'Hara also concentrated on expanding the graduate school. New construction included Notre Dame Stadium, the law school building, Rockne Memorial, numerous residential halls, Cushing Hall of Engineering and a new heating plant. This rapid expansion, which cost the university more than $2.8 million was made possible in large part through football revenues. O'Hara strongly believed that the Fighting Irish football team could be an effective means to "acquaint the public with the ideals that dominate" Notre Dame. He wrote, "Notre Dame football is a spiritual service because it is played for the honor and glory of God and of his Blessed Mother. When St. Paul said: 'Whether you eat or drink, or whatsoever else you do, do all for the glory of God,' he included football."

=== World War II ===
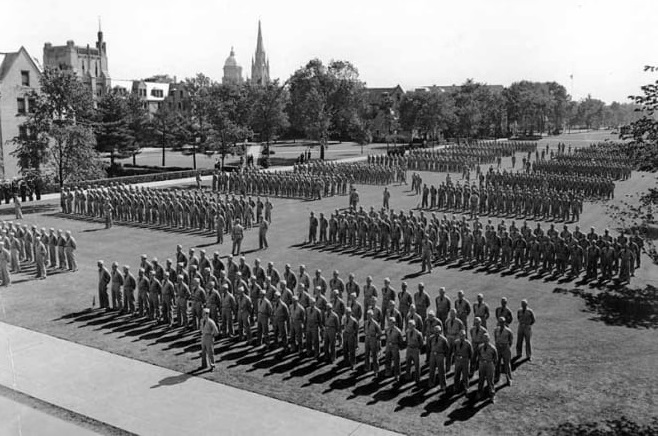
Navy ROTC cadets in formation on Notre Dame's campus during World War II

World War II was a crucial time for the university. At the beginning of the war, before the United States joined, the campus was not much affected and boasted 3,500 students. The only military related ventures were the establishment of the Naval ROTC in summer 1941 and contributions to military research done by the science and engineering faculty. All changed with the attack on Pearl Harbor and the entry of the United States into the conflict. Notre Dame saw a decrease in enrollment due to students joining the armed services, leaving only 750 students on campus, and leading to a loss of tuition revenue. At the same time, donations from alumni dried out, as money was directed to the war effort. The situation was so dire that Fr. Hesburgh stated that the university was in danger of closing.

The situation changed when president Hugh O’Donnell reached out to Admiral Chester Nimitz to offer Notre Dame's facilities to the Navy. In January 1942, the Navy decides to establish a V-7 program training course (or "indoctrination") at Notre Dame. About 1,200 officer trainees arrive in April 1942, and are housed in Morrissey, Howard, Lyons, and Badin Halls, while a drill hall and an office building are built on the site of the present day Hesburgh Library. The officer trainees tooke their meals at South Dining Hall (which converted to cafeteria-style for the occasion), and took classes in Washington Hall and the Engineering building. In October 1942 the program becomes a full-fledged United States Naval Reserve Midshipmen's School and the officer trainees receive a full four-month course. Ten classes of officers passed through the V-7 program at Notre Dame, and by the time it ended in November 1945 it had graduated more than 10,000 officers.

Starting in July 1943, Notre Dame was also chosen to host a V-12 Navy College Training Program. Trainees of the V-12 program took classes with the Notre Dame faculty (rather than from their own officers like in the V-7 program) and were hosted in Dillon, Alumni, Walsh, Cavanaugh, and Zahm Halls. The Naval ROTC meanwhile was hosted Walsh Hall. There were so many swimming classes in the lakes that civilians were restricted to two hours of swim per day.

Between the V-7, V-12, and NROTC program, more than 25,000 reserve Naval officers passed through Notre Dame between 1941 and 1946. The presence of these programs ballooned the university's student population from a paltry 750 to the 3,500-4,000 range and above and kept Notre Dame financially viable during the war years. During this period, Notre Dame was a virtual military base and was referred to as "Annapolis West", according to Secretary of the Navy John H. Dalton. In gratitude for keeping Notre Dame afloat, Father Hesburgh promised to keep the Naval Academy on the football schedule for as long as it wants, and the yearly Notre Dame-Navy football game has been a revered tradition for both teams since.

=== Post-War years ===
O'Donnell also continued O'Hara's work with the graduate school. He further formalized the graduate program and replaced the previous committee of graduate studies with a dean.

The Rev. John J. Cavanaugh, C.S.C. served as president from 1946 to 1952. Cavanaugh's legacy at Notre Dame in the post-war years was devoted to raising academic standards and reshaping the university administration to suit it to an enlarged educational mission and an expanded student body and stressing advanced studies and research at a time when Notre Dame quadrupled in student census, undergraduate enrollment increased by more than half, and graduate student enrollment grew fivefold. Cavanaugh also established the Lobund Institute for Animal Studies and Notre Dame's Medieval Institute. Cavanaugh also presided over the construction of the Nieuwland Science Hall, Fisher Hall, and the Morris Inn, as well as the Hall of Liberal Arts (now O'Shaughnessy Hall), made possible by a donation from I.A. O'Shaughnessy, at the time the largest ever made to an American Catholic university. Cavanaugh also established a system of advisory councils at the university, which continue today and are vital to the university's governance and development

== Hesburgh era: 1952–1987 ==
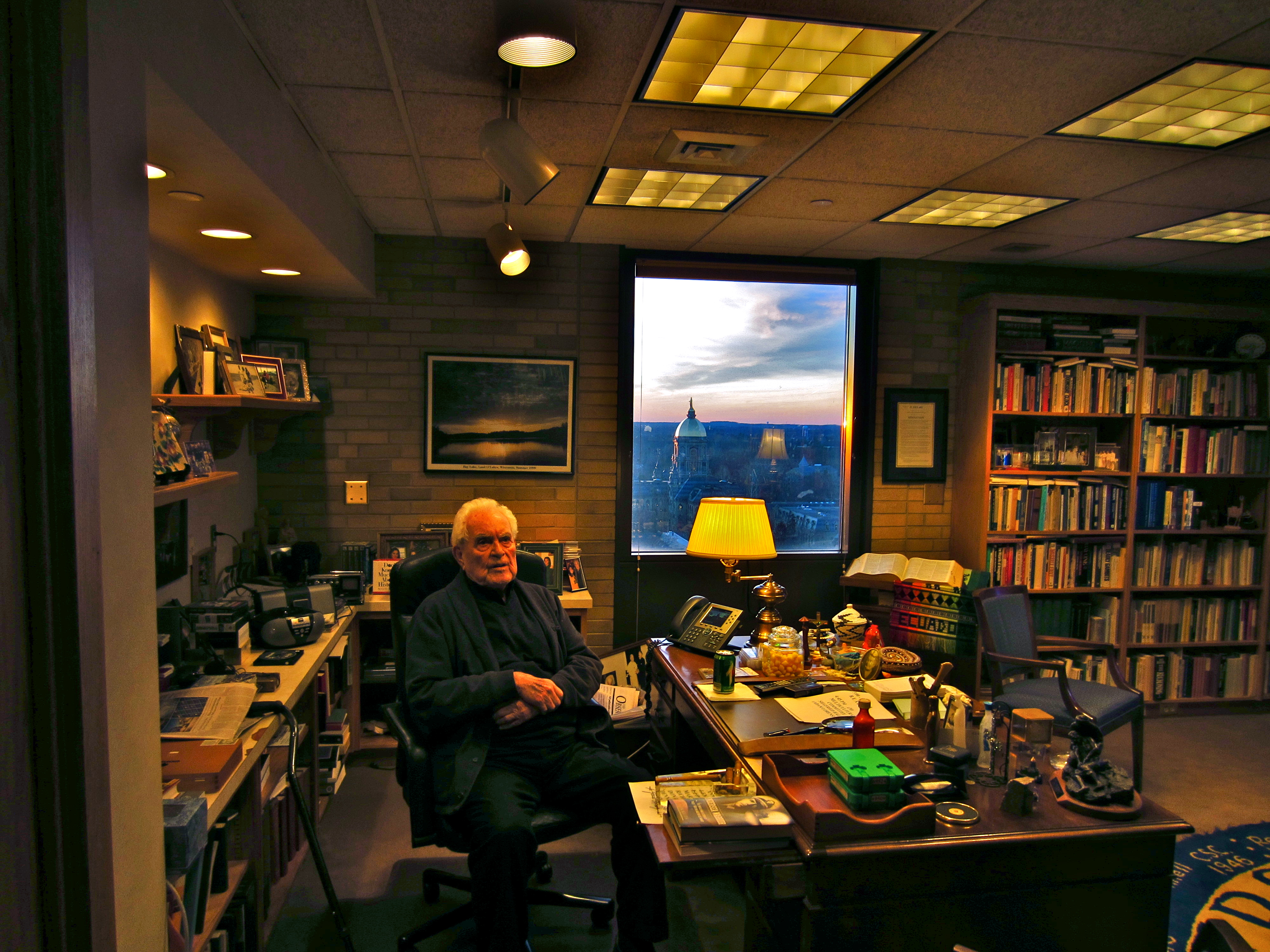
President Emeritus Hesburgh in his office at the Hesburgh Library at the University of Notre Dame

Rev. Theodore Hesburgh, C.S.C. (born 1917) served as president for 35 years (1952–87) of dramatic transformations. In that time, the annual operating budget rose by a factor of 18 from $9.7 million to $176.6 million, and the endowment by a factor of 40 from $9 million to $350 million, and research funding by a factor of 20 from $735,000 to $15 million. Enrollment nearly doubled from 4,979 to 9,600, faculty more than doubled 389 to 950, and degrees awarded annually doubled from 1,212 to 2,500.

On October 18, 1963, Martin Luther King Jr. spoke at the Stepan Center, in an event organized by the South Bend Citizens’ Civic Planning Committee as a fundraiser for the Southern Christian Leadership Conference. King spoke about the problems of segregation, discrimination, and the civil right movement. The event, arranged by Hesburgh, was at the venue's capacity and attracted a racially mixed crowd estimated at 3,000 to 3,500 people.

=== Coeducation ===
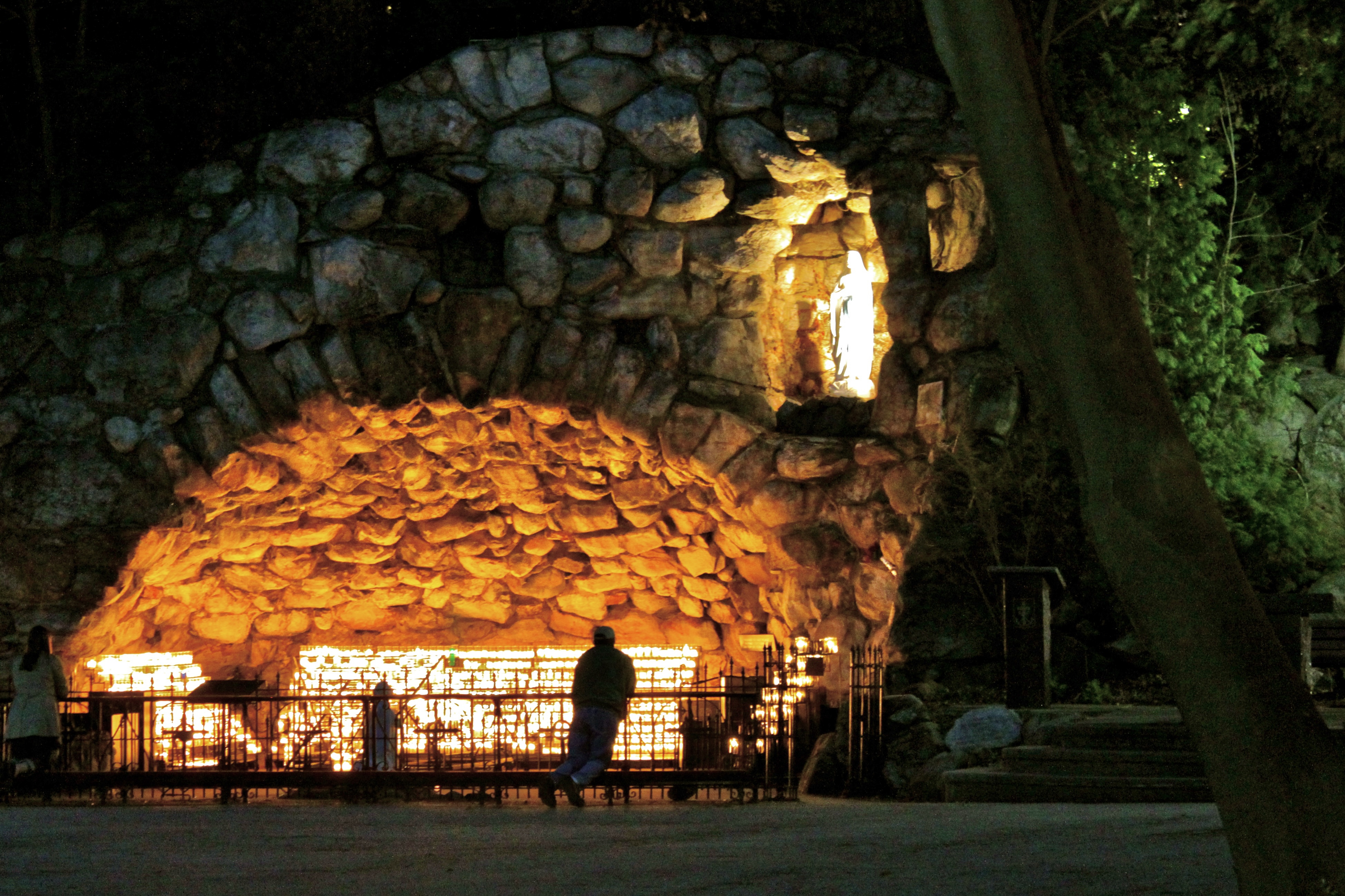
The Grotto of the Lady of Lourdes (a replica of a Catholic holy site by the same name in France) on the Notre Dame campus is a popular site of worship and meditation.

In the mid-1960s, Notre Dame and Saint Mary's College developed a co-exchange program whereby several hundred students took classes not offered at their home institution, an arrangement that added undergraduate women to a campus that already had a few women in the graduate schools. "In American college education," explained Rev. Charles E. Sheedy, C.S.C., Notre Dame's Dean of Arts and Letters, "certain features formerly considered advantageous and enviable are now seen as anachronistic and out of place.... In this environment of diversity, the integration of the sexes is a normal and expected aspect, replacing separatism." Reverend Thomas Blantz, C.S.C., Notre Dame's Vice President of Student Affairs, added that coeducation "opened up a whole other pool of very bright students." Two of the male residence halls were converted for the newly admitted female students that first year, while two others were converted for the next school year. The first female student, a transfer from St. Mary's College, graduated in 1972 with a bachelor's degree in marketing.

== Modern era ==
=== Malloy era: 1987–2005 ===
In 18 years under President Edward Malloy, CSC, (1987–2005), there was a rapid growth in the school's reputation, faculty, and resources. He increased the faculty by more than 500 professors; the academic quality of the student body has improved dramatically, the average SAT score rose from 1240 to 1360; the number of minority students more than doubled; the endowment grew from $350 million to more than $3 billion; the annual operating budget rose from $177 million to more than $650 million; and annual research funding improved from $15 million to more than $70 million. Notre Dame's most recent capital campaign raised $1.1 billion, far exceeding its goal of $767 million, and is the largest in the history of Catholic higher education.

=== Jenkins era: 2005–2024 ===
In 2005, Rev. John I. Jenkins, CSC became the 17th president of the university. Jenkins took over the position from Rev. Edward "Monk" Malloy, CSC, on July 1, 2005. In his inaugural address, Jenkins described his goals of making the university a leader in research that recognizes ethics and building the connection between faith and studies.

==== COVID-19 pandemic ====
Since the late winter of 2020, the operations of Notre Dame have been affected by the ongoing pandemic of coronavirus disease 2019 (COVID-19) caused by severe acute respiratory syndrome coronavirus 2 (SARS-CoV-2). On February 28, 2020, the University of Notre Dame issued its first coronavirus-related suspension of in-person academic program, that of a study abroad program in Rome, Italy. On March 11, 2020, Notre Dame announced that it would suspend all in-person academic programs, and the university began virtual instruction on March 23, 2020. In May 2020, the university announced that in-person instruction would resume during the fall semester 2020. Notre Dame resumed in-person instruction in August 2020, temporarily suspended in-person instruction later that month following a surge in COVID-19 cases, and once again returned to in-person instruction by early September.

The fall semester of 2020 was a time marked by changes at Notre Dame. The Notre Dame Fighting Irish football team, which had previously been independent since its 1887 inaugural season, joined the Atlantic Coast Conference for the duration of the 2020 college football season. Students returned to school two weeks early and did not have their usual fall break. The university implemented mandatory testing, contact tracing, and quarantine measures for students, faculty, and staff, though the quality of these services has been the subject of controversy.

In October 2020, Jenkins tested positive for COVID-19 after having attending the White House Supreme Court nomination ceremony for Notre Dame professor Judge Amy Coney Barrett. He had been photographed at the ceremony while not wearing a mask, leading to mixed reactions from students and faculty.

Students experienced high levels of stress throughout the fall semester, with an October survey conducted by Notre Dame revealing that over two-in-five undergraduate students experienced moderate to severe stress throughout the semester. Notre Dame's measures to combat widespread student feelings of loneliness, isolation, anxiety, and depression were deemed ineffective. By the end of the fall semester 2020, 15% of undergraduate students attending the University of Notre Dame had been diagnosed with COVID-19.

During the spring semester 2021, Notre Dame continued to hold classes in-person. Mass gatherings of students towards the beginning of the semester posed a challenge to Notre Dame's COVID-19 response. In March 2021, Notre Dame revealed that it had been allocated enough doses of the Pfizer–BioNTech COVID-19 vaccine to vaccinate all students prior to the end of the spring semester, with the first doses to be given in April 2021.

== Presidents of the university ==
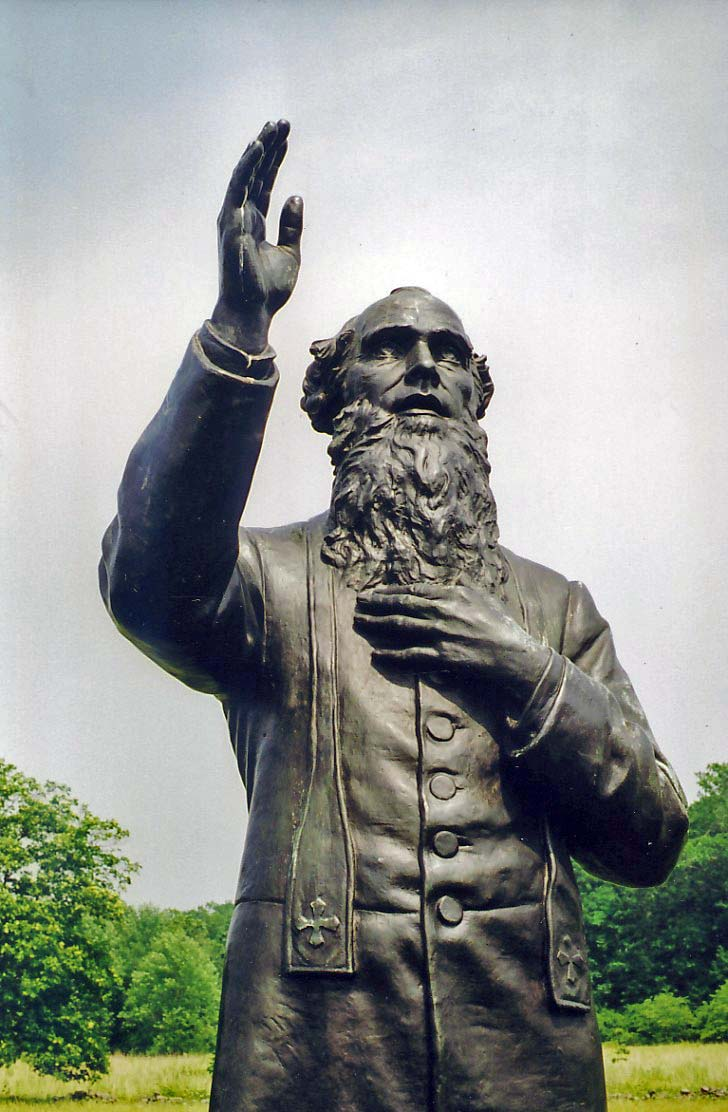
Father William Corby (1903–10) by Samuel Murray, Gettysburg Battlefield, Gettysburg, Pennsylvania.

The President of the University of Notre Dame is the head of the institution and is elected by the board of Trustees.

He is chosen among the priests of the Congregation of Holy Cross. The first president was the founder of the university, Rev. Edward Sorin, who came from France in 1842. Many of the presidents are alumni of the university or have taught as professors.

1. Edward Sorin, C.S.C. (1842–1865)
2. Patrick Dillon, C.S.C. (1865–1866)
3. William Corby, C.S.C. (1866–1872 and 1877–1881)
4. Auguste Lemmonier, C.S.C. (1872–1874)
5. Patrick Colovin, C.S.C. (1874–1877)
6. Thomas E. Walsh, C.S.C. (1881–1893)
7. Andrew Morrissey, C.S.C. (1893–1905)
8. John W. Cavanaugh, C.S.C. (1905–1919)
9. James A. Burns, C.S.C. (1919–1922)
10. Matthew J. Walsh, C.S.C. (1922–1928)
11. Charles L. O’Donnell, C.S.C. (1928–1934)
12. John Francis O’Hara, C.S.C. (1934–1940)
13. Hugh O’Donnell, C.S.C. (1940–1946)
14. John J. Cavanaugh, C.S.C. (1946–1952)
15. Theodore M. Hesburgh, C.S.C. (1952–1987)
16. Edward Malloy, C.S.C. (1987–2005)
17. John I. Jenkins, C.S.C. (2005–2024)
18. Robert A. Dowd, C.S.C. (2024-present)

== Sources ==
- Notre Dame – One Hundred Years
- Chronicles of Notre Dame du Lac
- Brother Aidan's Extracts
- Academic Development: University of Notre Dame Past, Present and Future by Philip S. Moore, C.S.C.
- My Fifty Years at Notre Dame by Leo R. Ward, C.S.C.
- The University of Notre Dame du Lac: Foundation, 1842–1857 by John Theodore Wack
- 1865 Guide to Notre Dame and St. Mary's
