= Timothy Edward Howard =

American judge and educator (1837–1916)

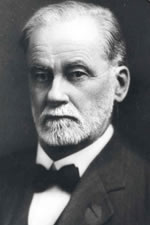

Indiana Supreme Court Justice
- In office January 2, 1893 – January 2, 1899

Member of the Indiana Senate
- In office 1886–1892

Personal details
- Born: January 27, 1837 near Ann Arbor, Michigan, U.S.
- Died: July 9, 1916 (aged 79) South Bend, Indiana, U.S.
- Resting place: Cedar Grove Cemetery; Notre Dame, Indiana, U.S.
- Party: Democratic
- Spouse: Julia A. Redmond (m. 1864, died)
- Children: 10
- Education: University of Michigan/University of Notre Dame (AB); Notre Dame Law School (LLB)
- Occupation: Politician; lawyer; judge; educator; writer

Timothy Edward Howard (January 27, 1837 – July 9, 1916) was the 43rd Justice of the Indiana Supreme Court, professor at the University of Notre Dame, writer, and Civil War veteran. He served in the Indiana Senate from 1886 to 1892.

== Early life and education ==
Timothy Edward Howard was born near Ann Arbor, Michigan, on January 27, 1837, to Marvin or Martin Howard and Julia B. Howard. His father was a farmer. He attended county schools and Ypsilanti Union School. He attended the University of Michigan at Ann Arbor, but left in his sophomore year. He briefly attended the University of Michigan, received a Bachelor of Arts from the University of Notre Dame in 1862, and a Bachelor of Laws degree from the Notre Dame Law School in 1873. Howard also received a diploma from the literary department at the University of Michigan.

== Career ==
=== Education career ===
Howard taught in country schools and was elected inspector of schools in Northfield Township, Michigan.

Timothy Howard served on the faculty at Notre Dame from 1862 to 1914 with a few interruptions for public service. During his tenure he taught a wide range of subjects, including Astronomy, Civil Engineering, English Language and Literature, History, Latin, Law, Mathematics, and Rhetoric. He held the chair of rhetoric and English literature at Notre Dame for nearly twenty years. He served as dean of the Law School in 1908–09.

In 1898 he became the first Notre Dame alumnus to receive the Laetare Medal, awarded by Notre Dame to a Catholic "whose genius has ennobled the arts and sciences, illustrated the ideals of the church and enriched the heritage of humanity."

=== Military career ===
On February 5, 1862, Howard enlisted in Company I of the 12th Michigan Volunteer Infantry Regiment. He was seriously wounded at the Battle of Shiloh during the American Civil War. He recovered in a hospital in Evansville, Indiana, and was discharged from service on June 14, 1862, due to his injuries.

=== Political and law career ===
In 1878 Howard was elected to the South Bend City Council, representing the fourth ward, as a Democrat. He remained with the City Council until 1883. From 1879 to 1883 Howard served as clerk of the Circuit Court in St. Joseph County, and in 1883 he was admitted to the bar. He led the effort to create a public park on the St. Joseph river bank, which today bears his name.

Howard was elected to the Indiana Senate as a Democrat in 1886 and served two terms. He was re-elected in 1890, but resigned in the spring of 1892.

In 1892, Howard was elected as a judge to the Supreme Court and served six years. After he retired from the bench, Howard continued to practice law until his death. He served as city attorney from 1888 to 1893 and county attorney in South Bend.

In 1901, Howard was appointed by Governor James A. Mount as president of the Fee and Salary Commission. Governor Winfield T. Durbin appointed Howard as delegate to the tax conference at the Pan-American Exposition in Buffalo in 1901. Governor Durbin appointed him as a member of the commission of 1903–1905 to codify the laws of the state.

Howard also was president of the Northern Indiana Historical Society, and in 1907, he wrote a history of St. Joseph County. He also wrote other books on Indiana history.

== Personal life ==
Howard married Julia A. Redmond of Detroit on July 14, 1864. They had ten children. His wife predeceased him. He lived at 714 East Cedar Street in South Bend. He was a member of the Catholic Church.

Howard died on July 9, 1916, at St. Joseph's Hospital in South Bend following an operation a few days prior. He was buried at Cedar Grove Cemetery at the University of Notre Dame.

== Legacy ==
Howard Park in South Bend was named after him for his contributions to starting South Bend's public park system.

Howard Hall at the University of Notre Dame was dedicated in 1925 in his honor.

== See also ==
- List of justices of the Indiana Supreme Court
