= Matthew J. Walsh =

American priest (1882–1963)

The Very Reverend Matthew J. Walsh C.S.C.
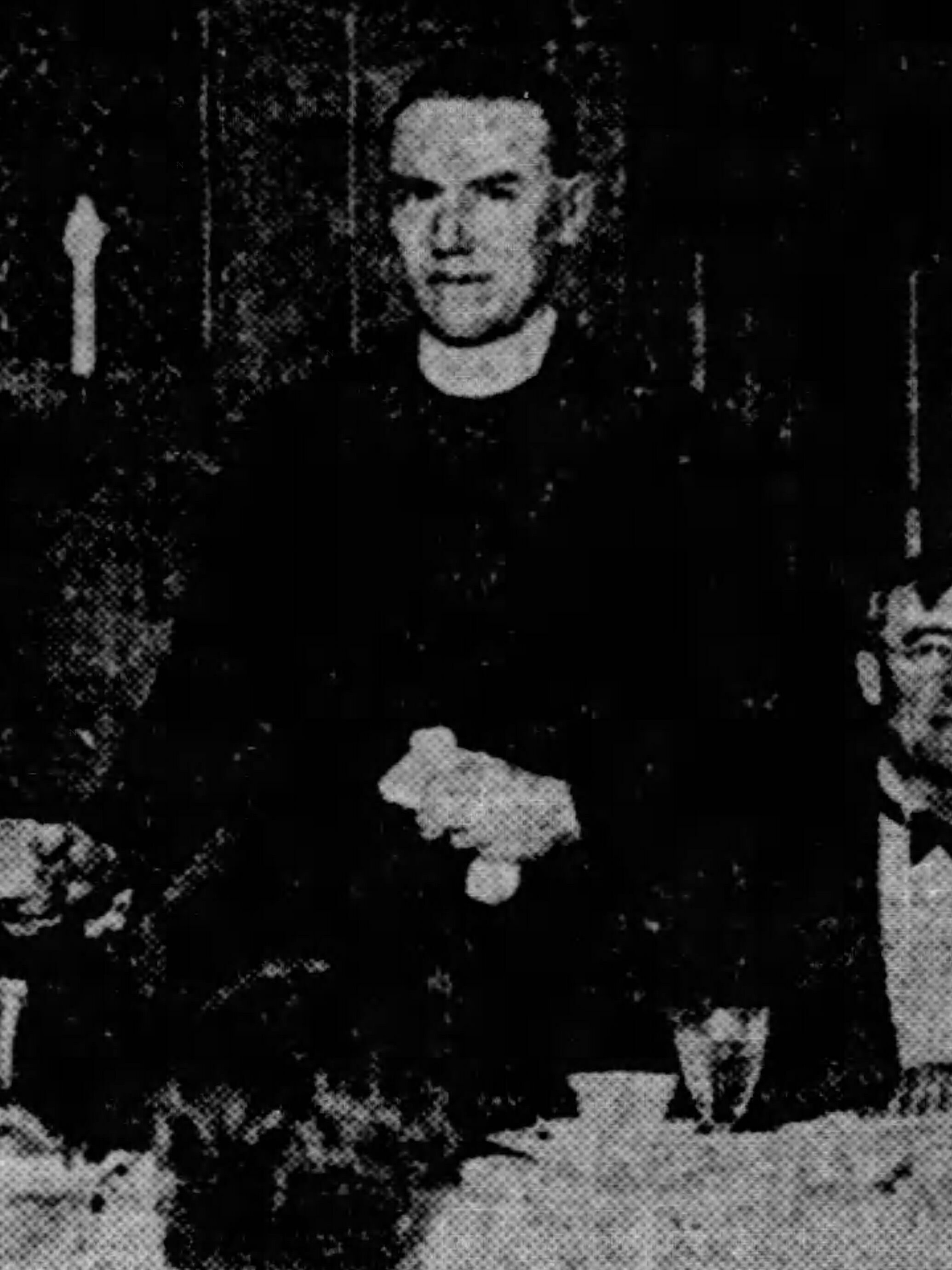
- Walsh in 1927

10th President of the University of Notre Dame
- In office 1922–1928
- Preceded by: James A. Burns
- Succeeded by: Charles L. O'Donnell

Personal details
- Born: May 14, 1882 Chicago, Illinois, U.S.
- Died: January 19, 1963 (aged 80) Notre Dame, Indiana, U.S.
- Resting place: Holy Cross Cemetery, Notre Dame, Indiana
- Education: Columbia University, Johns Hopkins University
- Alma mater: Catholic University of America, University of Notre Dame

Matthew J. Walsh, C.S.C. (May 14, 1882 – January 19, 1963) was an American Catholic priest who served as president of the University of Notre Dame from 1922 to 1928, after having served as vice president from 1912 to 1922.

He graduated from the University of Notre Dame and obtained a Ph.D. from the Catholic University of America. He also attended courses at Columbia University and Johns Hopkins University.

== Early life ==
Matthew Walsh was born May 14, 1882, in Chicago, the seventh of ten children and grew up in St. Columbkille parish in Chicago. His parents were David Walsh, from Mitchellstown, County Cork, Ireland and Joanna Clogan, from Troy, New York. He initially attended public school for one year and then the local parish school, which was run by Holy Cross Brothers from Notre Dame. After finishing the eighth grade, he attended the Brothers' High School for one year, before deciding in 1897 to become a priest. Accompanied by his mother, he took a train to South Bend where he enrolled at the Congregation of Holy Cross 's seminary.

Initially he finished his high school work under Dr. Linneborn, rector of the seminary, and in 1899 he started his college work under Linneborn's successor Fr. John W. Cavanaugh. In 1903 Walsh graduated from Notre Dame, and then spent one year in the novitiate under Father William Connor, followed by Matt Walsh went to attend Holy Cross College, at Washington. He also attended classes at the newly founded Catholic University, where he was the first student to enroll in American history classes. In 1907 he graduated with a doctorate with the thesis The Political Status of Catholics in Colonial Maryland. In the summer of 1907 he attended Columbia University and in September he enrolled at Johns Hopkins University where he studied economics. Walsh was ordained priest at the Apostolic Mission House in Washington, DC, on December 21, 1907, and then took the train for Chicago, where he celebrated his first Mass in St. Columbkille's Church on Christmas Day.

He served as military chaplain in World War I in 1918–19. He was professor of history at Notre Dame from 1908 to 1922 and then from 1935 to 1951. Dr. James Monaghan, a very popular and beloved professor of history and economics at Notre Dame, was inducted in the consular service of the United States in late 1907, and Notre Dame hired Walsh to replace him. Walsh was prefect in Corby Hall and later in Sorin Hall. In 1911, Fr. John J. Cavanaugh made him his vice-president.

== President of the University of Notre Dame ==
The Provincial Chapter elected Walsh to the presidency of Notre Dame in the summer of 1922. As president, he addressed the material needs of the university, particularly the debt and the lack of sufficient space for new students. When he assumed the presidency, more than 1,100 students lived off campus, only 135 students were paying for room and board, and the university had a $10,000 debt. With fund-raising money, Walsh at once concentrated his efforts on the construction of a dormitory system. He built Freshman Hall in 1922 and Sophomore Hall in 1923. During 1924 and 1925 he began construction of Morrissey, Howard and Lyons. By 1925 enrollment had increased to 2,500 students, of which 1,471 lived on campus. Faculty members increased from 90 to 175 during Walsh's presidency. He also completed South Dining Hall by 1927. On the academic side, credit hours were reduced to encourage in-depth study and Latin and Greek were no longer required for a degree. Walsh also expanded the College of Commerce, which had been organized in 1920. In 1928 three years of college were made a prerequisite for the study of law. He also enlarged the stadium, and built the memorial and entrance transept of the Basilica of the Sacred Heart.
