= Lyons Hall (University of Notre Dame) =

Residence hall at the University of Notre Dame

- University of Notre Dame
- Arms: Sable a lion or
- Campus quad: South
- Motto: Kindness, Gentleness, Self-Sacrifice
- Established: 1927
- Named for: Joseph Lyons
- Colors: Black and gold
- Gender: Female
- Rector: Karla Diaz
- Undergraduates: 183
- Chapel: All Souls'
- Mascot: Lions
- Sports: Basketball, flag football, racquetball, soccer, and volleyball
- Major events: Mara Fox Run, Volley For the Vet
- Website: LyonsHallND.com
- Lyons Hall
- U.S. Historic district – Contributing property
- Location within Indiana
- Location: Notre Dame, Indiana
- Coordinates: 41°42′03″N 86°14′36″W
- Built: 1926-1927
- Architect: Francis Kervick & Vincent Fagan
- Architectural style: Collegiate Gothic
- Part of: University of Notre Dame: Main and South Quadrangles (ID78000053)
- Added to NRHP: May 23, 1978

Map
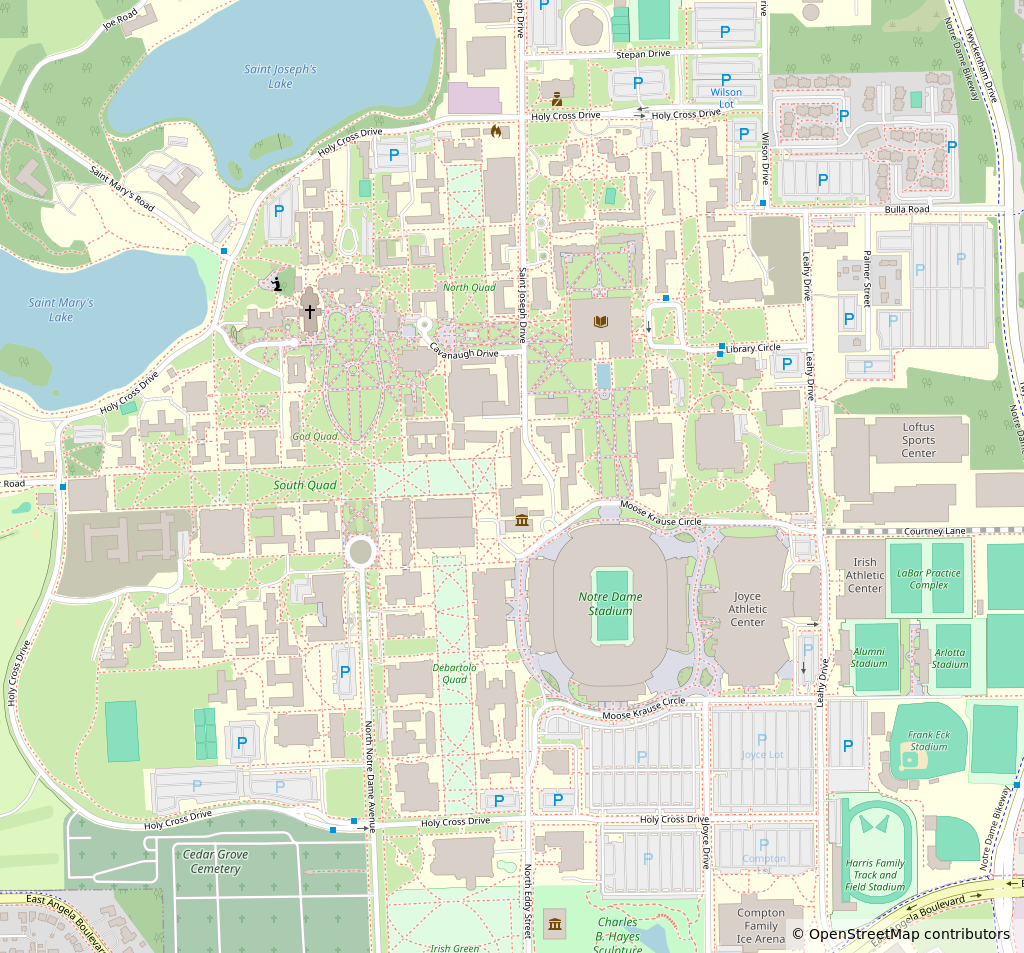
- Location within Notre Dame, Indiana

Lyons Hall is one of the 33 Residence Halls on the campus of the University of Notre Dame and one of the 15 female dorms. It is located on South Quad, and constitutes the "Golden Coast" with Morrissey Hall and Howard Hall. Built in 1925–1927, it is dedicated to professor Joseph Lyons, and hosts 203 undergraduates. The coat of arms features a golden lion on a black field, representing an example of canting arms. Its arch overlooking St. Mary's lake is a campus landmark. Along with other buildings on Notre Dame's campus, it is on the National Register of Historic Places.

== History ==
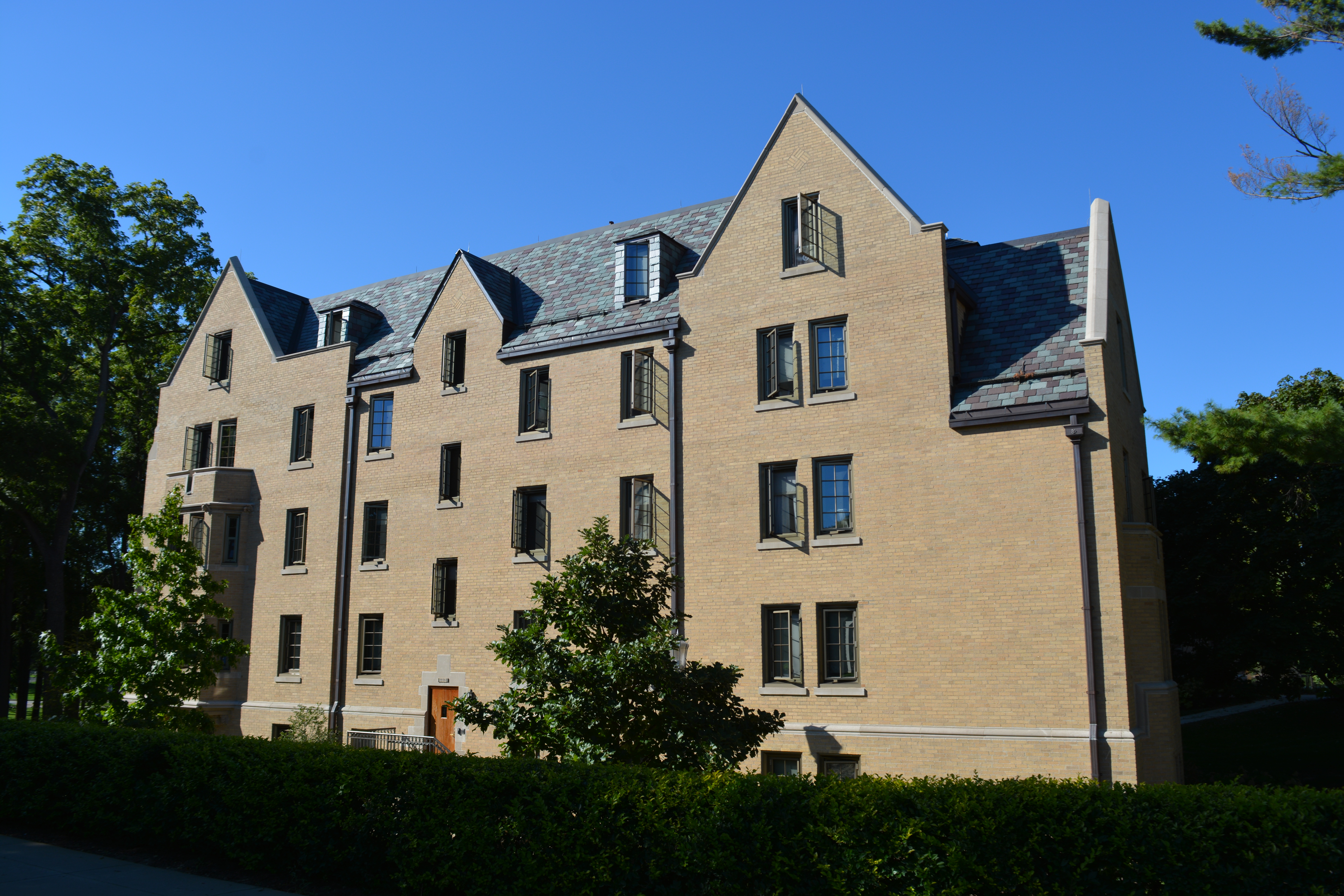
Lyons Hall, giving on South Quad

Lyons Hall was built between 1925 and 1927 as the third of three new freshman dorms built by president Walsh; Howard and Morrissey Halls had been the first two. The construction of these dorms was needed to obviated the on-campus housing shortage due to the rapid increase in student population after World War I. The building of these dorms was assigned to the architecture firm of Francis W. Kervick (1883–1962) and Vincent F. Fagan (1898–1951), who were also professors at the Notre Dame department of architecture. Taken together, the three halls added about 600 students on campus. Because of their location, new style, and beauty, the three dorms acquired the name of "Gold Coast".

Construction of the southern wing of Lyons was completed by the fall of 1926, while the northern wing was completed in the fall of 1927. When the first wing opened it accommodated more than a hundred students. The northern wing, which was started in late 1926, completed the quadrangle towards Morrissey and Howard and features an archway and a view on the lake. The architecture of it matched that of the southern wing of Lyons and of Morrissey and Howard, and it hosted about 100 additional students plus the rector's facilities and ten rooms for lay faculty members in wing north-east of the arch. Charles Doremus was its first rector. The three new dorms were seen as the most modern and most beautiful on campus at the time when built, and Lyons in particular was appreciated for integrating views of the lake in its design.

Lyons hosted Navy Midshipmen of the United States Naval Reserve Midshipmen's School during World War II. At the 1972 An Tóstal celebrations, an annual spring event with games and competitions, Lyons Hall hired an elephant from a local circus for the tug-o-war.

In 1974 it underwent a renovation and was converted to Notre Dame's sixth residence hall for women. In 2013, in underwent a $6.2 million renovation which included renovation of the student rooms, an upgrade of the electrical system, redone interiors, a new rector apartment, new student amenities, new shared kitchens and lounges, and a complete overhaul of the chapel and its access staircase. The changes included a decrease in occupancy since some triples were converted into doubles and some rooms became study spaces.

Lyons has a long history of faculty-in-residence. When originally built, the small wing above and east of the arch (towards Morrissey) hosted lay faculty members. Francis Kervick, one of the architects of the hall and professor of Architecture, lived himself in Lyons for many years. The tradition was revived in 2013, when Ed Hums, professor of accountancy, and his wife, Shirley ’97MNA, from IT support, moved into Lyons as faculty-in-residence.

== Namesake ==
Lyons Hall is dedicated to the memory of Professor Joseph A. Lyons, one of Notre Dame's most distinguished early faculty members. Joseph Lyons was born in Utica, New York, on November 7, 1834. Lyons first came to Notre Dame as a fifteen-year-old orphan in 1848, entering the shoemaker's shop in the Manual Labor School (nowadays Badin Hall) as an apprentice. By 1851 he had impressed even Father Sorin with his skills in shoemaking, his determination and his attitude. Lyons taught himself Latin at night while an apprentice. As a reward, the President awarded one free year of tuition at the university, and Lyons entered the seminary to study for the priesthood. After five years he decided to pursue a career in teaching instead of the priesthood. Lyons then again entered the university and graduated from Notre Dame in 1862 with highest honors. He taught at Notre Dame as professor of English for 26 years and was one of the most beloved figures on campus, was widely popular among students and other faculty, and was heavily involved with many student societies such as the Columbian Literary and Debating Club, the St. Cecilia Philomathean Association, the St. Stanislaus Philopatran Society. He compiled the story of the university for the celebrations of the Silver Jubilee in 1867. His death on August 22, 1888, was met with an outpouring of grief, condolences, and letter from faculty, students, alumni, and friends of the university from all over the world. The funeral mass was celebrated by William Corby, Matthew J. Walsh, and Andrew Morrissey and the body was then buried in the Holy Cross Cemetery, where traditionally only Holy Cross priests and brothers lay. His was the first case of a lay man being buried there. In 1892, a monument was erected on his tomb, consisting of a granite obelisk with the words "Erected to his memory as a tribute of the affection of the old students." and "He was always the same-kind and gentle, sincere and self-sacrificing."

== Architecture ==
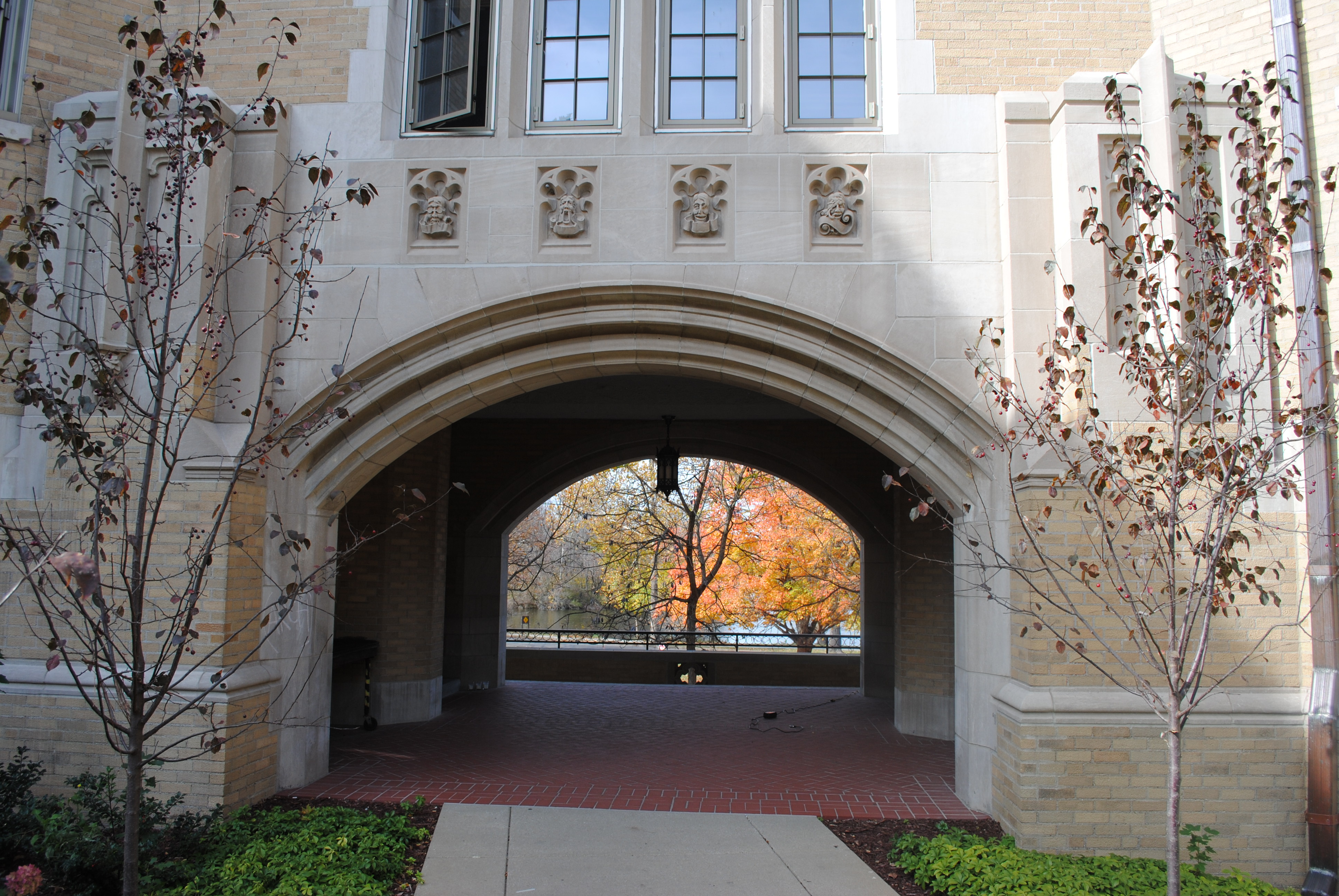
Lyons Arch, University of Notre Dame

The Lyons arch, by far the building's most distinctive feature, "frames St. Mary's Lake, providing a delightful vista as well as a picturesque entrance to the hall." The arch, designed by Kervick, "was so sited that from several vantage points on the western half of the South Quadrangle (for example, from the front entrance steps of the South Dining Hall) a walker, while surrounded by buildings, could have a view of the lake." A statue of Saint Joseph the worker stands atop the archway, a work of Hungarian sculptor Eugene Kormendi, who was sculptor in residence at Notre Dame. A popular urban legend says that if a couple walks and kisses under Lyon's Arch, they are bound to marry in the future. The chapel is built in the basement, and it is a subterranean barrel vaulted environment with a medieval-like sanctum atmosphere, and it reached by a winding staircase.

== Traditions ==
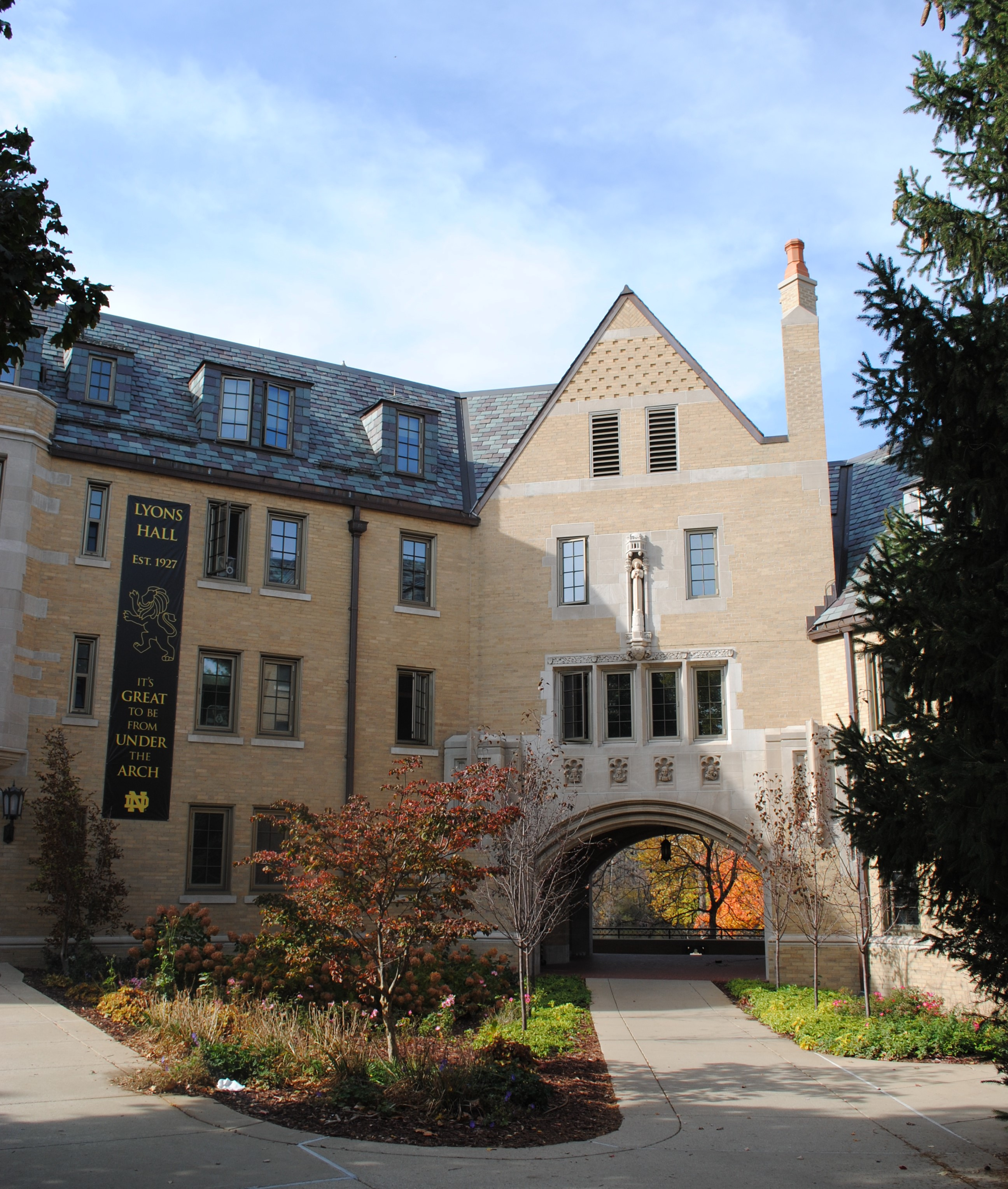
Lyons Hall arch

The basement of Lyons is referred to as the "lair" or the "den". The signature event of the hall is the Mara Fox Fun Run, established in 1993 to honor Fox, a Lyons freshman killed by a drunk driver. It consists of a 5k and a 1k, and the profits go towards a scholarship for students of Spanish. Another memorial to Fox is a large Central American cross that hangs in the hall lounge. The hall hosts the Lyons Luau fall dance ball in front of Saint Mary's Lake. Lyons also hosts a week dedicated to women's empowerment during Spirit Week. The women of Lyons Hall compete in various sports, including basketball, bowling, cross country, dodgeball, flag football, golf, lacrosse, racquetball, soccer, table tennis, tennis, and volleyball. On All Souls’ Day (November 2 or 3) residents of the hall commemorate and lay a wreath on Joseph Lyons’ grave.

Its chapel is dedicated to All Souls. It has a vaulted ceiling, and it was renovated in 2014 as a gift from the Brolick family. Lyons Hall was featured in the movie Rudy.

== Notable residents ==
- Kathleen Blatz '76
- James Brady '59
- Emilio Garza '69
- Regis Philbin
- Pedro Rossello '66
- John H. Garvey '70
- Jim Rohr '70
- Phil Donahue '57
- Jim Wetherbee '74
- Barry Voight '59
- Dan Lungren

== Sources ==
- Hall Profile
