= Howard Hall (University of Notre Dame) =

Female dormitory on Notre Dame campus

- "Swing" Residence Hall
- University of Notre Dame
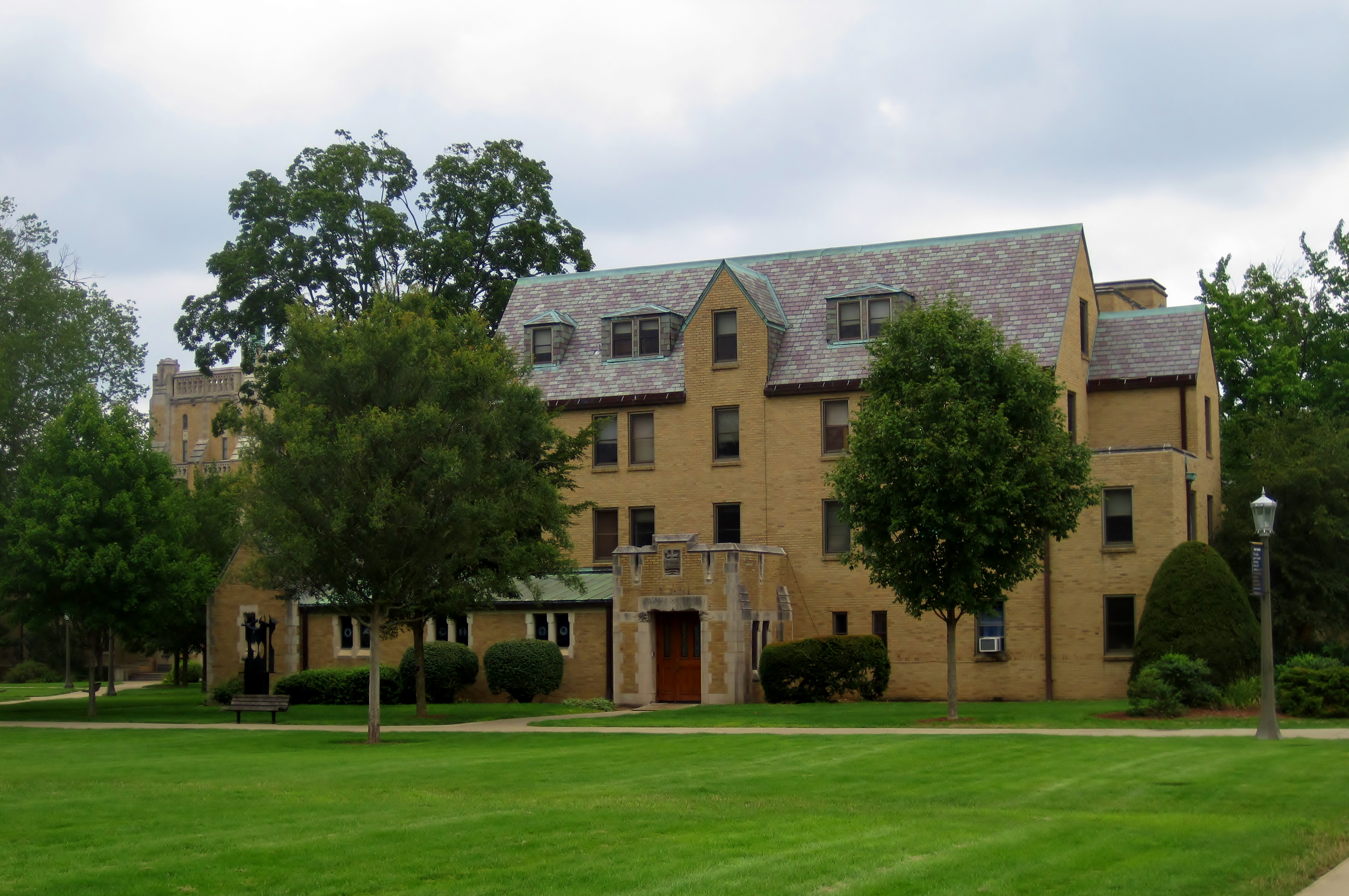

- Arms: Quarterly, 1st and 4th Vert a bend between six ross crosslet fitchy Or 2nd and 3rd Azure a duck displayed proper
- Campus quad: South
- Established: 1924
- Named for: Timothy Edward Howard
- Colors: Yellow and green
- Gender: Female
- Undergraduates: 145
- Chapel: Our Lady of Lourdes
- Mascot: Ducks
- Sports: Basketball, bowling, cross country, dodgeball, flag football, golf, lacrosse, racquetball, soccer, table tennis, tennis, volleyball
- Charities: National Bone Marrow Donor Program
- Major events: Annual Bone Marrow Drive, Totter for Water, Chapel Crawl
- Website: http://www.nd.edu/~howard
- Howard Hall
- U.S. Historic district – Contributing property
- Location within Indiana
- Location: Notre Dame, Indiana
- Coordinates: 41°42′03″N 86°14′30″W
- Built: 1924-1925
- Architects: Francis Kervick & Vincent Fagan
- Architectural style: Collegiate Gothic
- Part of: University of Notre Dame: Main and South Quadrangles (ID78000053)
- Added to NRHP: May 23, 1978

Howard Hall is one of the 33 Residence Halls on the campus of the University of Notre Dame. It is located north of South Dining Hall on University of Notre Dame's South Quad and is immediately surrounded by Badin Hall on the east, Morrissey Manor on the west, and Bond Hall on the north. Built in 1924–1925, it is dedicated to Timothy Edward Howard, with a capacity for 145 students. The coat of arms is based on that of the Howard family adapted to fit Howard Hall, changed to match those of the hall, and the lions were substituted with ducks (the hall mascot). Starting in the 2026–2027 school year, residents were relocated to the newly constructed Grojean Hall. The building was repurposed as a "swing" residence hall, housing communities of residents whose halls are being renovated or rebuilt. It will host the Keenan Hall Community beginning in the 2027–2028 school year.

== History ==
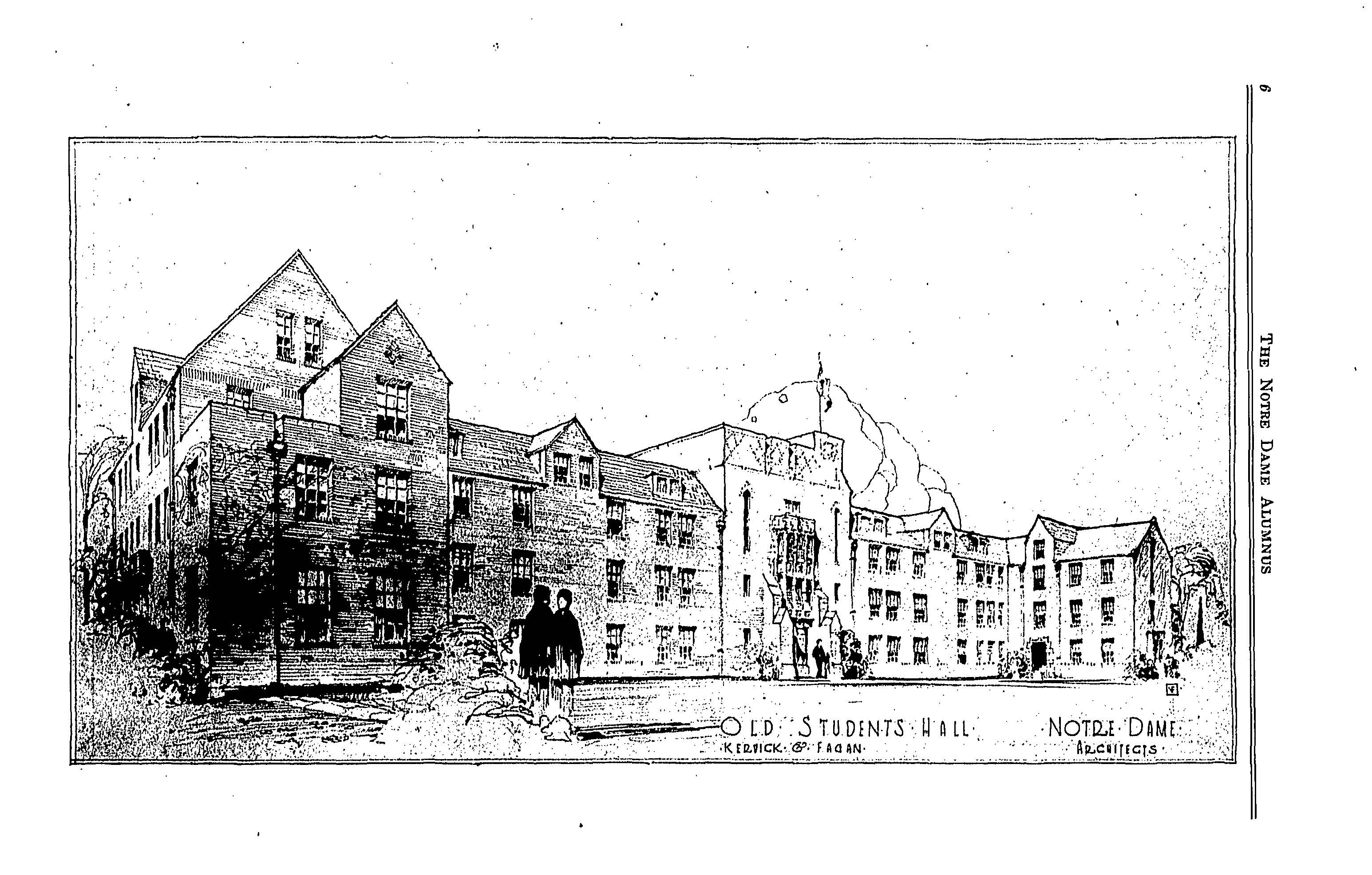
Original prospect plan by Kervick and Fagan, October 1924

Construction on Howard Hall began in September 1924 and was completed in the summer of 1925 as the first of three new freshman dorms built by president Walsh; Morrissey and Lyons Halls followed in the next few years. The construction of these dorms was a response to the high number of Notre Dame's collegiate students living off campus and the rapid increase in student population after World War I. The building of these dorms was assigned to the architecture firm of Francis W. Kervick (1883–1962) and Vincent F. Fagan (1898–1951), who were also professors at the Notre Dame department of architecture. Construction was contracted to Sollitt Construction.

Howard Hall was the first instance of a Notre Dame building being built in the collegiate Gothic style, and together with Morrissey and Lyons they formed a semi-closed gothic courtyard that inspired subsequent gothic architecture on campus. The buildings still employed the classic yellow brick and minimal limestone, in order to blend with the pre-existing campus. Because of their location, new style, and beauty, the three dorms acquired the name of "Gold Coast". Howard Hall was also the first building to be named after a lay person – Notre Dame Law Professor, poet, Civil War soldier, historian, first Laetare Medal winner, Indiana State senator, and Indiana Supreme Court Justice Timothy Edward Howard. It was the first building of the Freshman Unit to be built, and was later followed by Morrissey Hall and Lyons Hall. When it opened in the fall of 1925, it hosted about 150 freshmen.

The dorm was converted from a male to a female residence hall in 1987, during the period in which the university shifted to co-education and planned to increase the female population by 150 annually from 1987 to 1990, requiring the conversion of male halls into female ones and the construction of new ones. The decision and the short notice communication was heavily protested by Howard residents, who wore black or white armbands and hung protest signs, labeling themselves as the "Howard Homeless" and formed the "Howard Liberation Organization" to lament the loss of a fraternity-like atmosphere and such Howard traditions as the Howard Hat and Tie Party. The decision was also protested by Howard residents in the Student Senate, where the Senate agreed to support Howard in the writing of a letter to the administration denouncing the lack of communication with the hall rector and staff and the short notice given to residents. The new rector as Howard opened in 1988 was Sister Mary Jane Griffin, previously rector of Farley. The Howard mascot was Word, until 1991 when they voted to change it to the Ducks.

== Architecture ==
Howard Hall is a brick building rising four floors and built in an austere collegiate Gothic style, with low eaves ridges and gables of different sizes. The building is centered around a tower that surmounts an archway, from where two oak doors lead to the North and South wing respectively.

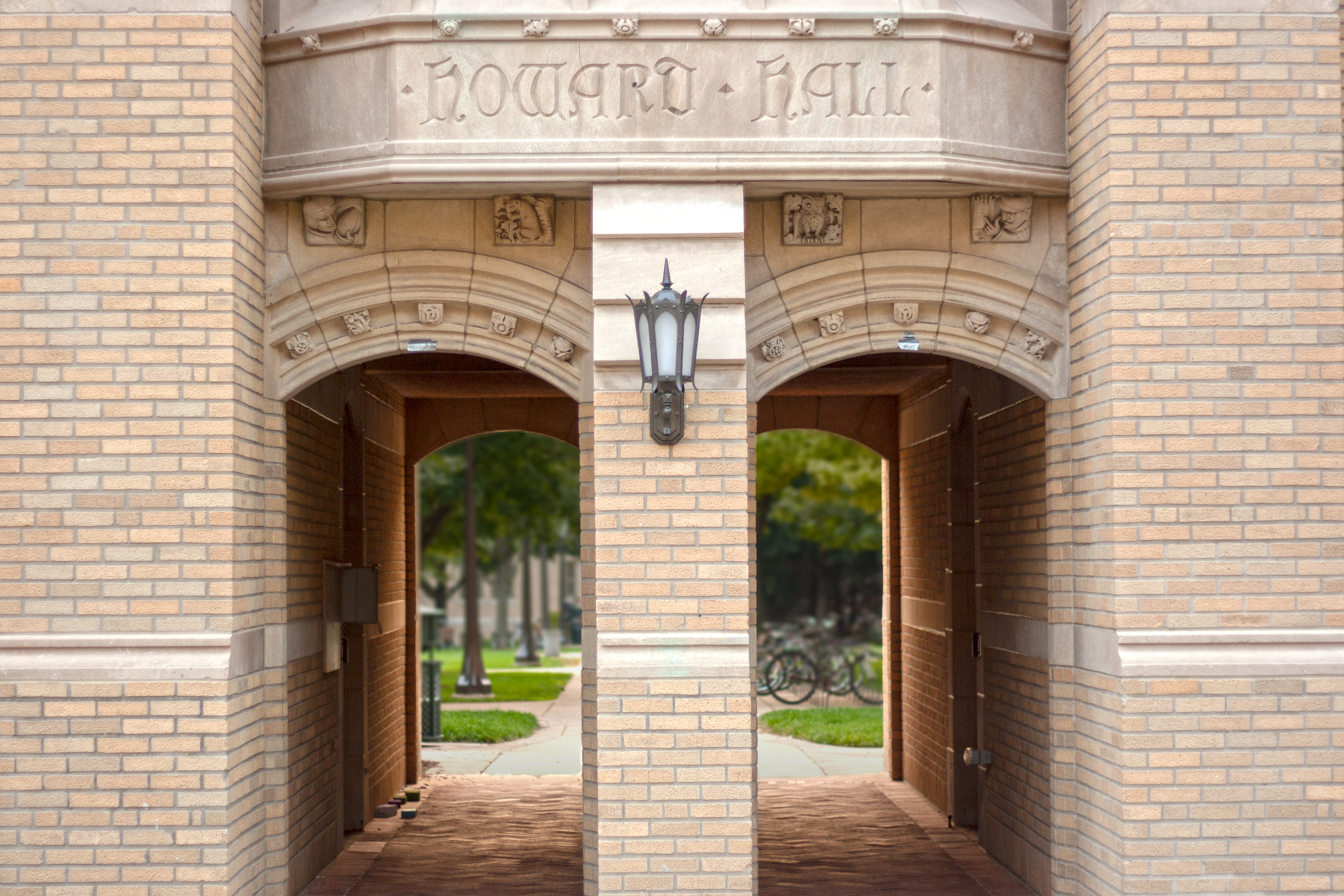
Howard Hall arch

The archway is surmounted by a large carved bay window that runs thought two floors and climates in an adorned parapet. Among the bas-relief of the arch are depiction of classic campus images: football, a squirrel, own (symbol of wisdom), and a student poring over books. The double archway that separates the first floor into two sections and passes under the upper three floors of the hall. Adorning these arches and the other main entrances to Howard are a number of gargoyle-type stone carvings depicting anything from an owl to a student who has just received a less-than-stellar report card. To the west, the archway is adorned with a statue of Saint Timothy by James Kress; Timothy being the first name of Howard, namesake of the hall.

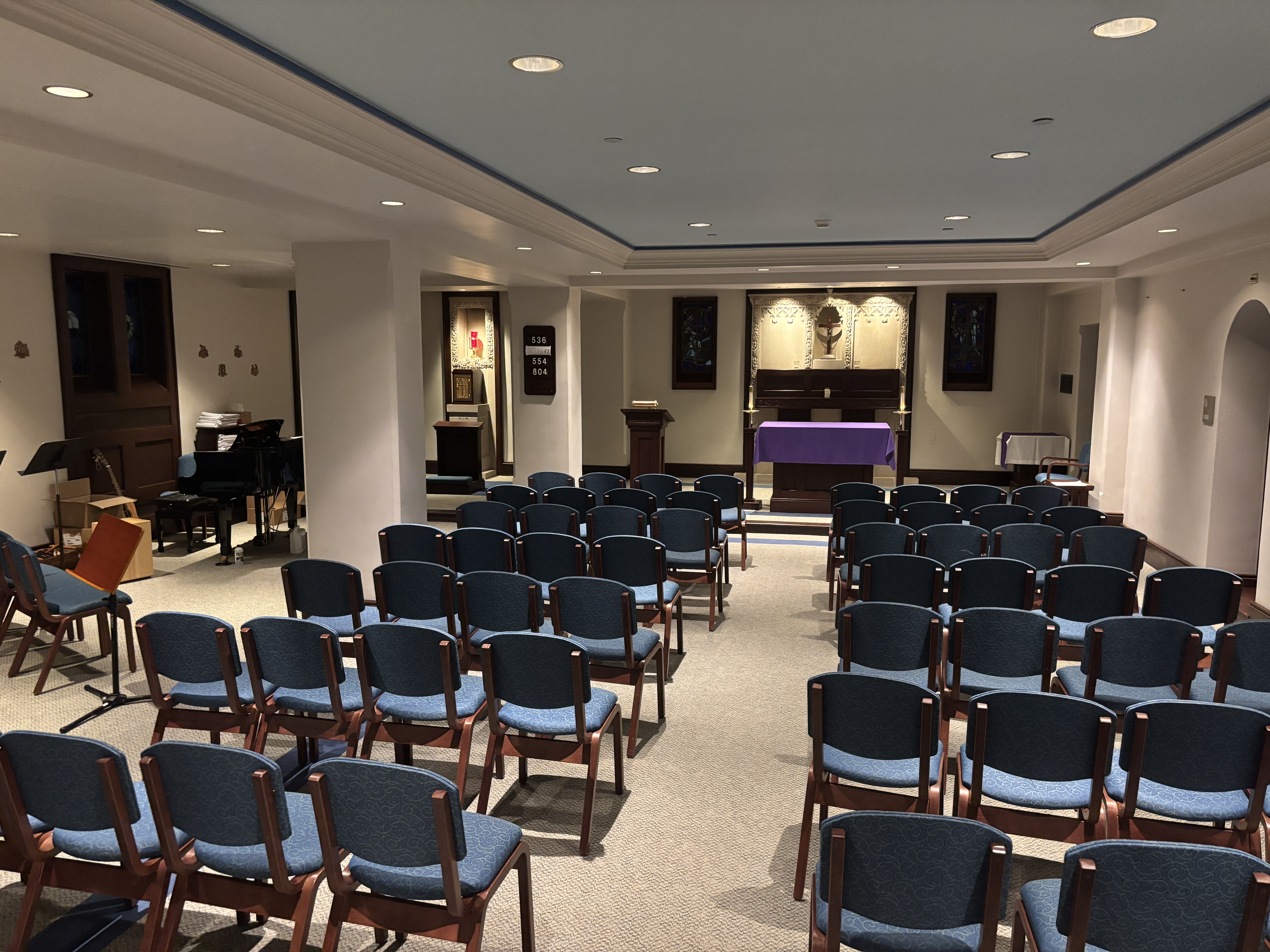
Chapel of the Immaculate Conception of Our Lady of Lourdes in Howard Hall

The chapel, dedicated to Our Lady of Lourdes, features a pietà by sculptor Jean de Marco, and two stained glass windows by Wilbur H. Burnham depicting Our Lady of Lourdes. On the outer gable of the chapel, facing the quad, there is a stone bas-relief depicting the Shield of the Trinity.

== Traditions ==
The Duck mascot was chosen after the 1986 film Howard the Duck by George Lucas. Although it is one of the smallest dorms on campus, Howard Hall has a number of signature events throughout the year. Among these events are the Howard Hoedown (a fall dance), Totter for Water (a 24-hour teeter-totter fundraiser designed to help third world countries access clean water), Howard Halliday (a miniature Christmas tree decorating event to raise money for local charities), and Walk for More Tomorrows (a spring event to raise awareness for suicide prevention).

In 2010, Howard Hall was named Women's Hall of the Year by Hall President's Council. In 2012 and 2022, Howard Hall was awarded the distinction of being Hall of the Year.

== Notable residents ==
- Bill Dwyre '66
- John Burgee
- Brittany Bock
- Francesca Russo

== Gallery ==
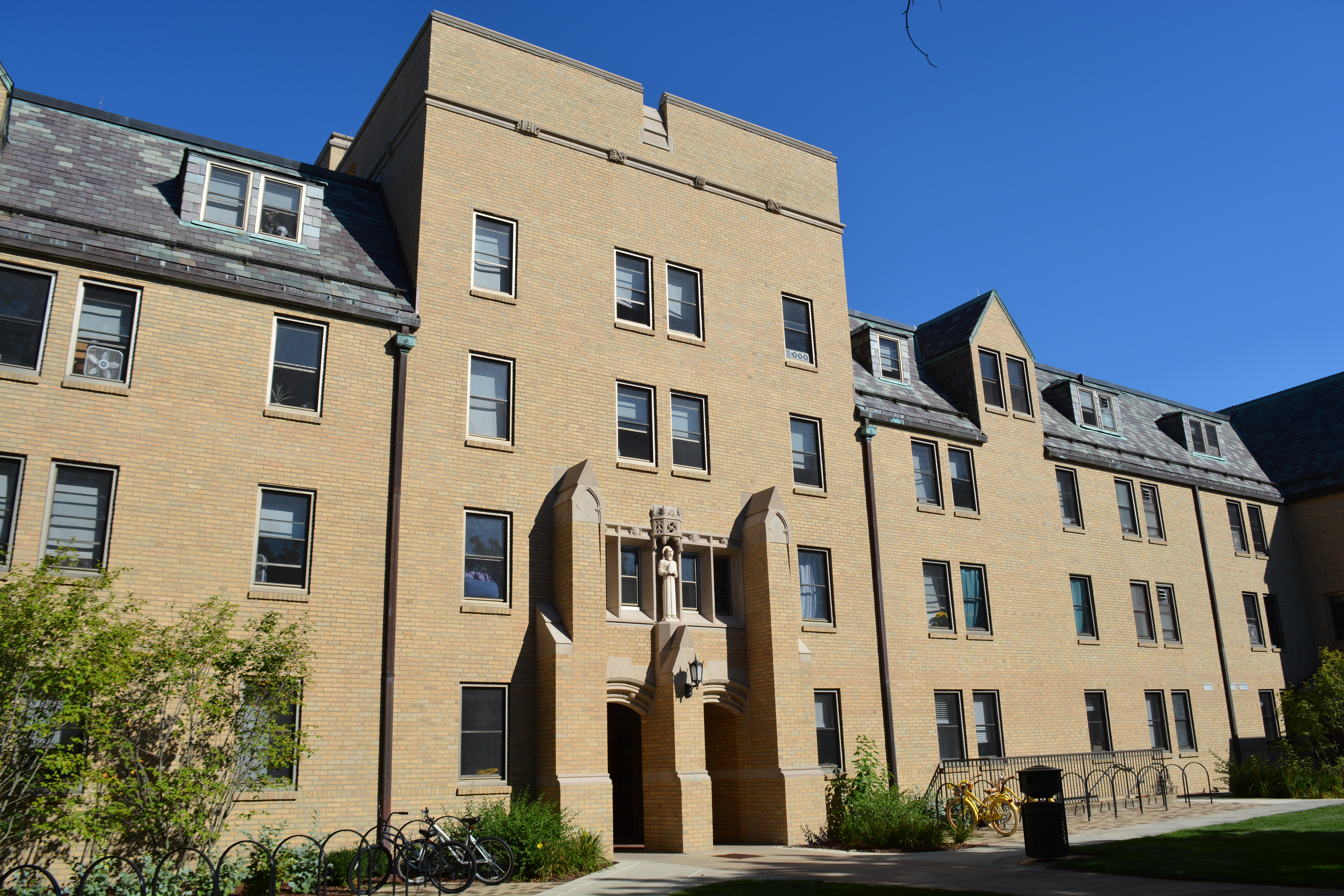
East side of Howard Hall, with its arch

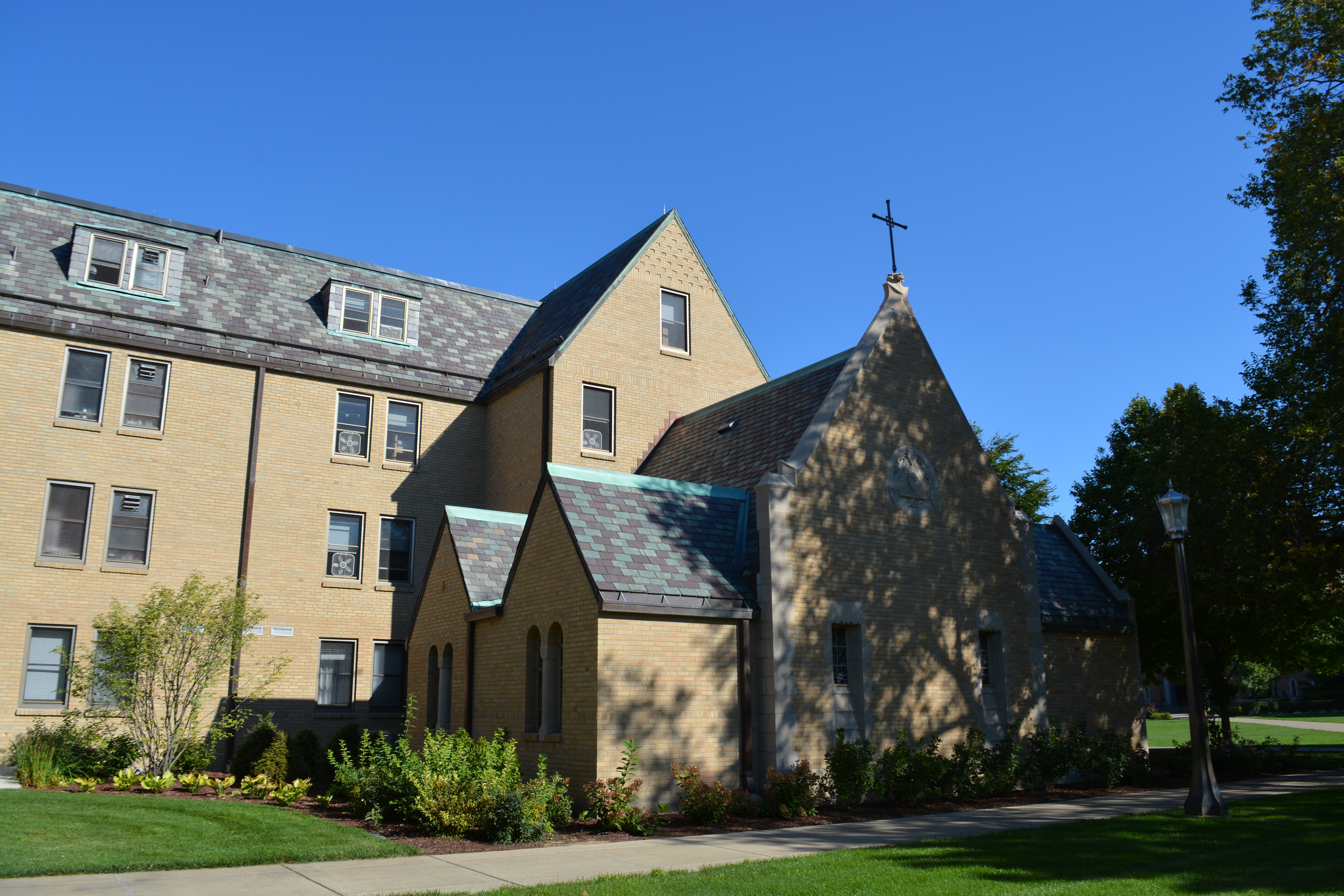
South Side with its chapel

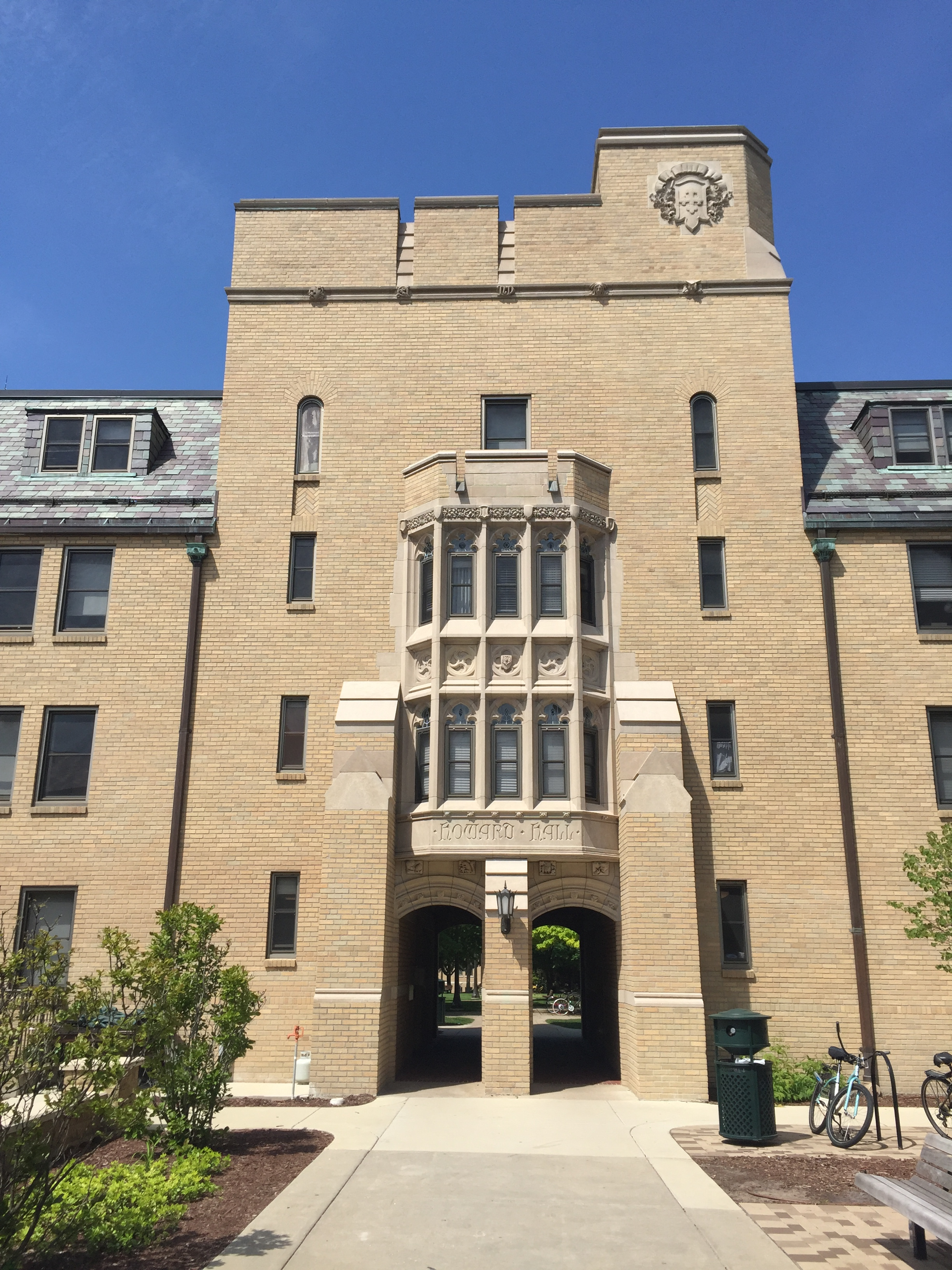
Main Entrance

== Sources ==
- Hall Profile
