= Morrissey Hall (University of Notre Dame) =

Residence hall at the University of Notre Dame

Morrissey Manor

- Arms: Sable a saltire Or
- Campus quad: South
- Motto: Brothers made by the same God, destined for the same glory
- Translation: It is good and pleasant for brothers to live together
- Established: 1926
- Named for: Andrew Morrissey
- Colors: Black and Gold
- Gender: Male
- Rector: David Diamond
- Undergraduates: 188
- Postgraduates: 2 (serving as Assistant Rectors)
- Chapel: Little Flower
- Mascot: Manorites
- Sports: Badminton, Baseball, Basketball, Bowling, Cross Country, Dodgeball, Football, Golf, Hockey, Lacrosse, Racquetball, Soccer, Table Tennis, Tennis, Volleyball
- Charities: Catholic Worker House
- Major events: Morrissey Game Watch, Manor Madness Week, Medallion Hunt, Mattress Race, Christmas Formal, Manorball, Yaz's, Manor Football League
- Website: http://morrissey.nd.edu
- Morrissey Hall
- U.S. Historic district – Contributing property
- Location within Indiana
- Location: Notre Dame, Indiana
- Coordinates: 41°42′03″N 86°14′33″W
- Built: 1925
- Architects: Francis Kervick & Vincent Fagan
- Architectural style: Collegiate Gothic
- Part of: University of Notre Dame: Main and South Quadrangles (ID78000053)
- Added to NRHP: May 23, 1978

Morrissey Hall, or Morrissey Manor, is one of the 33 Residence Halls on the campus of the University of Notre Dame and one of the 17 male dorms. Built in 1925–1926, its architects were Vincent Fagan and Francis Kervick. Along with other buildings on Notre Dame's campus, it is on the National Register of Historic Places.

== History ==
Howard Hall was completed in 1925 as the first of three new freshman dorms built by president Walsh; Morrissey and Lyons Halls were to be the next two. The construction of these dorms was a response to the high number of Notre Dame's collegiate students living off campus and the rapid increase in student population after World War I. The construction of both dorms was assigned to the architecture firm of Kervick and Fagan. Francis W. Kervick (1883–1962) and Vincent F. Fagan (1898–1951) were also professors in the university's architecture department and designed many of the school's new buildings during the 1920s. The university chose Smoger & Company to build Morrissey Hall for $275,000, and Christman Brothers to construct Lyons for $200,000.

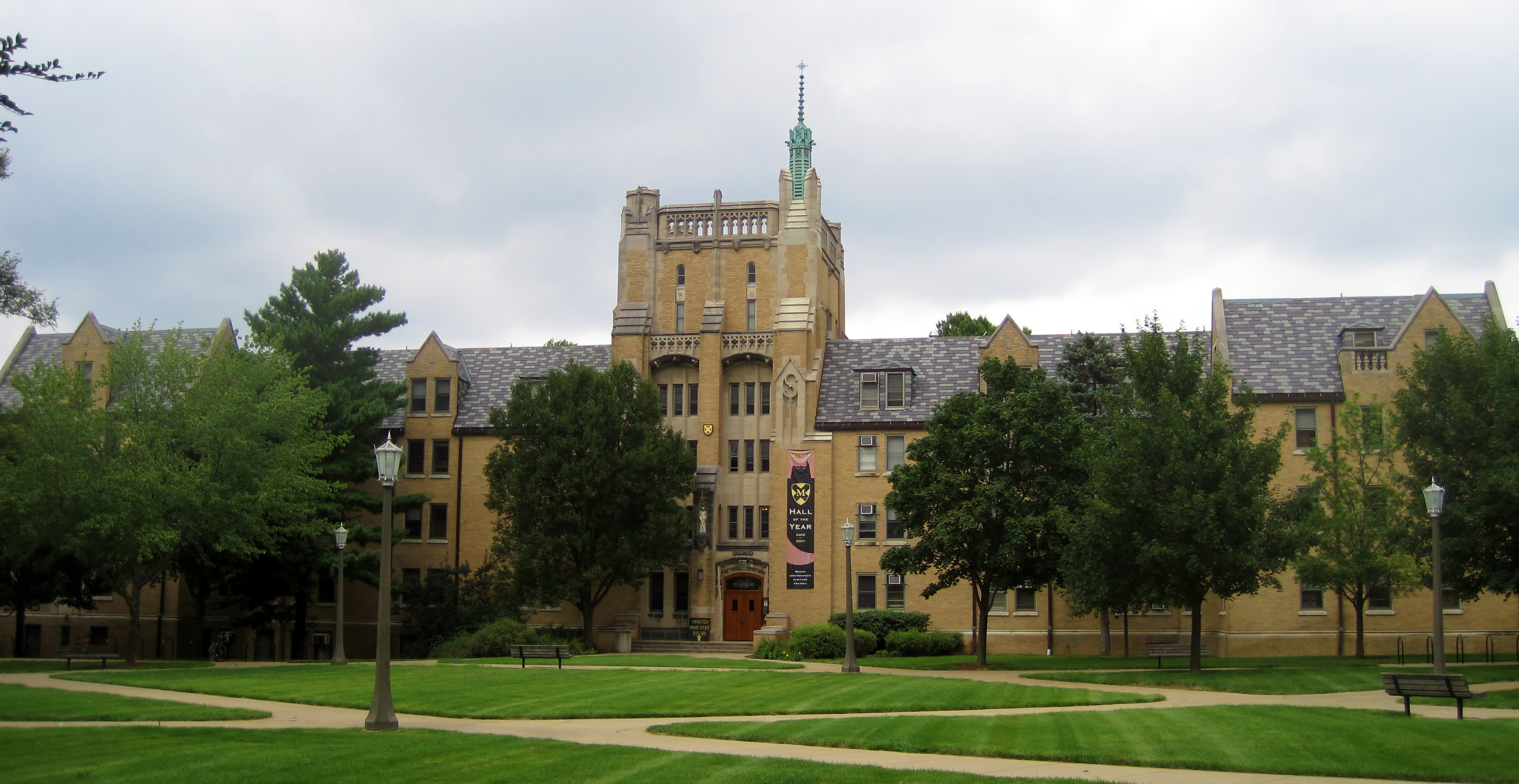
Morrissey Hall

Morrissey Hall features elaborate architecture, with detailed masonry and a tall tower. It became the center of the 'Gold Coast', the complex formed by Morrissey, Lyons and Howard, and the masterpiece of Kervick and Fagan. The stonework, reminiscent of Gothic cathedrals, and the entrance hall, reminiscent of a gentleman's club with fine wood paneling and a fireplace, made Morrissey regarded as an elegant construction at the time. Kervick and Fagan incorporated asymmetrical details including an off-center front door, a one-sided spire and mismatched roof-lines. A statue of Morrissey's patron saint, the apostle Andrew, stands to the left of the dorm's entrance, a work of Hungarian sculptor Eugene Kormendi, who was sculptor in residence at Notre Dame. Morrissey Hall's design was influenced by Tudor Gothic style, a more streamlined and less expensive version of collegiate gothic (following the work of Ralph Adams Cram on South Dining Hall).

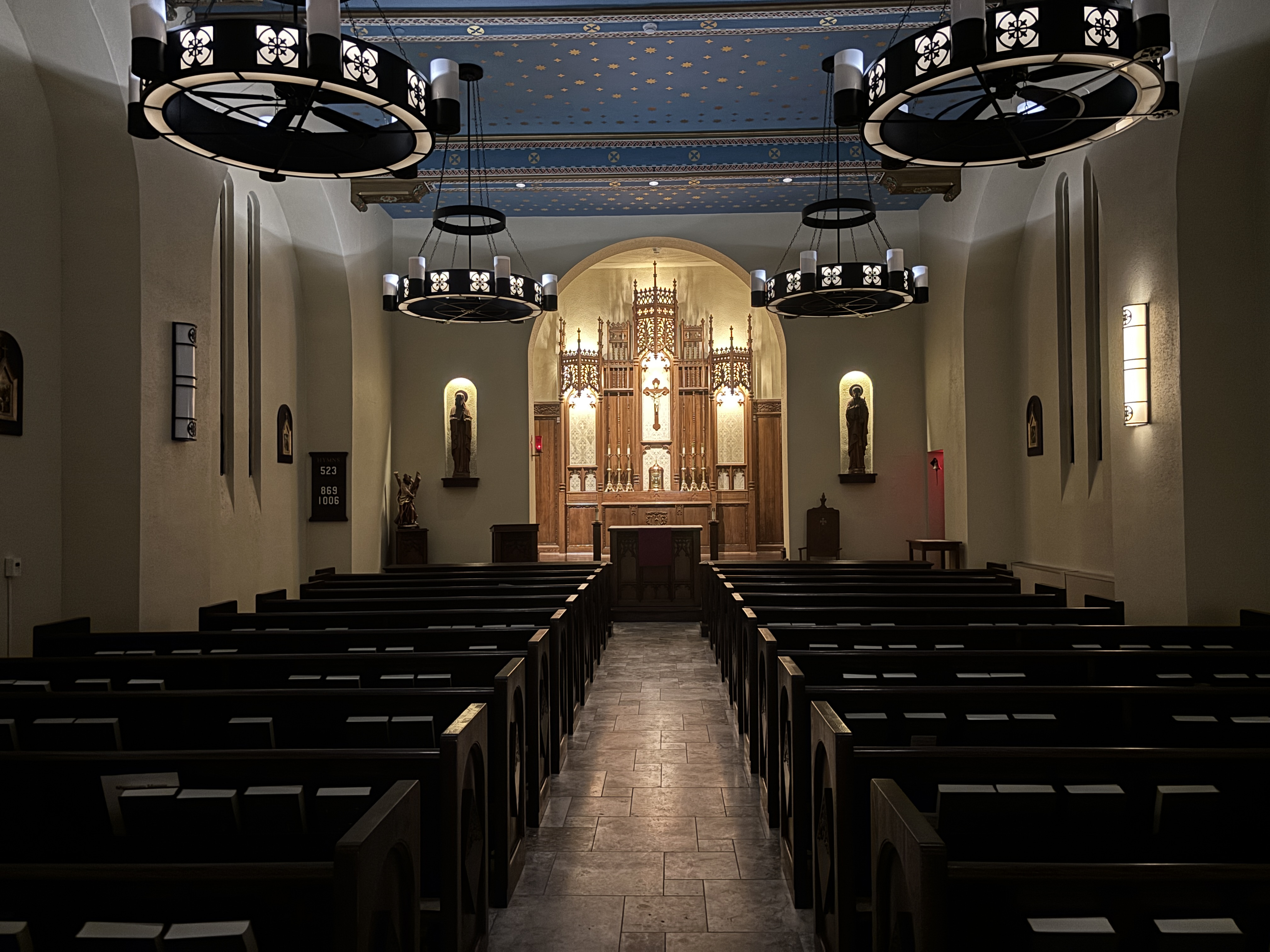
Chapel of St. Therese of Lisieux in Morrissey Hall

The construction of Morrissey and Lyons began in 1925 on land that was previously used as the university's farmland on the west side of the future South Quad. Morrissey was completed by the fall of 1926. Most of Lyons Hall was completed in time for fall classes in 1926, and its smaller east annex was completed in the fall of 1927.

Robert Woodward was rector of Morrissey until 1941, when he enlisted in the army to be a military chaplain, a role which he served until 1946. In the 1940s, Morrissey was home to the bachelor don professor Frank O'Malley, one of the most well known and beloved professors at Notre Dame. Rev. Edmund Joyce, CSC, longtime vice president of the university and right-hand man of Rev. Theodore Hesburgh, CSC, was assistant rector in Morrissey.

Morrissey Hall underwent a 2-year, multimillion-dollar renovation during the summers of 1997 and 1998. A complete overhaul of the exterior gave the hall new landscaping, sidewalks, a new roof, gutters, and more bike racks, while the interior renovation provided remodeled rooms for the students (with new doors, furniture, sinks, floors, and internet hook-ups for each student), new and improved common social spaces, study areas, laundry facilities in the basement, and lounges on each floor equipped with cable television.

The interior of the building was extensively renovated during the entirety of the 2018–2019 school year, during which the residents of Morrissey were temporarily relocated to nearby Pangborn Hall. The renovation remodeled most rooms, both common rooms and bedrooms, enlarging them and adding better furniture. The new and current hall has a variety of modern recreational features, such as custom foosball and air hockey tables in Yaz's, TVs with various gaming consoles in each of the five lounges (found on floors 1-4 and the basement) in the building. Some of the other upgrades include two full kitchens, two kitchenettes, and a back patio that overlooks St. Mary's Lake and Morrissey's beach volleyball court which was renovated in 2026.

== Insignia and traditions ==
Morrissey Hall is named after Fr. Andrew Morrissey, C.S.C., Notre Dame's seventh president. The dorm's motto, "Bonum Jucundumque Habitare Fratres" comes from Psalm 133. The phrase has evolved into a saying chanted at the end of every dorm mass, "Brothers made by the same God, destined for the same glory." The symbol of the hall is the Saltire, or St. Andrew's Cross, which represents St. Andrew, Fr. Morrissey's patron saint. Its coat of arms is the Cross of St. Andrew, yellow on black (the colors of the hall).

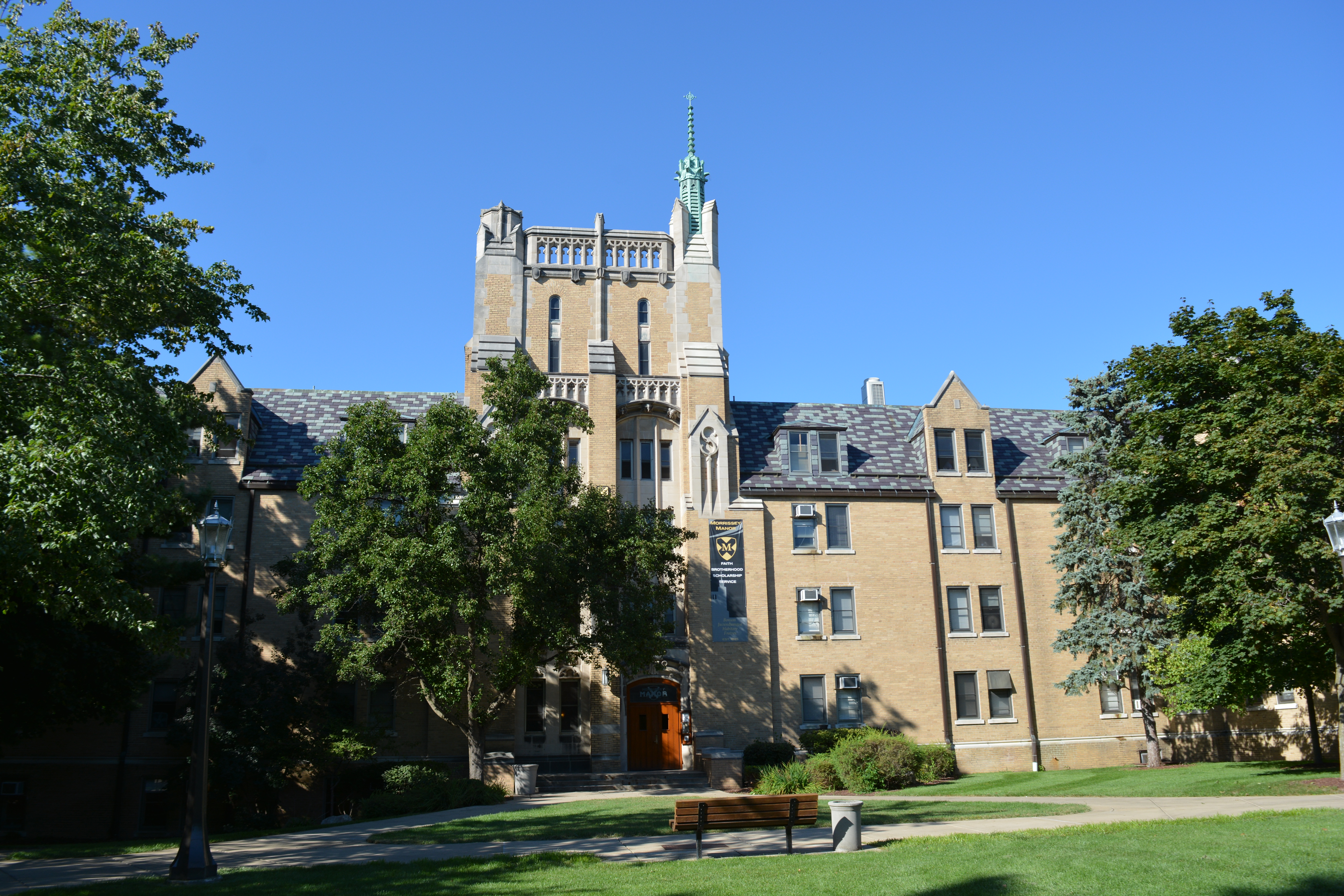
Entrance

Morrissey was one of the first dorms to have its own fight song, “Fight on for Morrissey”. It was written by Bill Murphy ‘74 in an attempt to rally the hall's football team over arch-rival Dillon. In 1970, the hall lost the Inter-Hall Football Championship to Dillon during a final game which was awarded to Dillon based on amassing more first downs. In 1971, the hall lost the title game again to Dillon on a snow-covered Moose Krause Field in a tiebreaker format. In 1972, during the third consecutive final against Dillon, the hall staged a pep rally in order to rally for the win and a fight song was created.

Two main aspects of dorm social life in Morrissey are the basement night-time restaurant, Yaz's, and weekly section competitions. Yaz's was founded in the early 1990s and in the late 2010s saw a resurgence by featuring Pork Mac n Cheese and a wide assortment of homemade shakes. The second key part of weekly community in the dorm, section competitions, is the newest of Morrissey's traditions. Founded in the fall of 2018 when Morrissey residents were temporarily in Pangborn Hall during the dorm's renovations, every Sunday night the seven sections of Morrissey compete in an event for the Manor Cup and a permanent plaque hung in the basement of Morrissey. Some of the most popular examples of these are a 3v3 basketball tournament, a hot wing eating contest, and a Mario Kart tournament.

Every year, Morrissey hosts a Christmas Formal in which historically Santa Claus would personally deliver invitations and candy canes to all of the ladies who were asked to the dance, although this part of the tradition has not occurred since the early 2010s. The day-long festivities of the modern dance, which include decorating the entire walls of the dorm in wrapping paper and a massive barbecue, take place on the Saturday before the final week of classes each Fall and culminate in a dance that is attended by nearly every resident. Although presently a significantly smaller tradition, historically one of the major traditions of the dorm is the Manor Medallion Hunt. Each spring, the Manor Medallion Hunt sweeps the Notre Dame campus by storm. During a week-long campus-wide search for a single three-inch medallion, daily riddles are printed in the Observer to help direct treasure hunters to the medallion. The lucky one who finds the medallion wins a prize of $250. An older discontinued Morrissey tradition is the Gilded Age Ball, when Morrissey residents step back in time and relive the days of the Gilded Age with a dance based on the music and attire of the 1920s.

== Sports and awards ==
Morrissey won Hall of the Year for 2006–2007. It also has been inter-hall football champion in 2006, 2014, and 2015, with a runner up in 2019. It won inter-hall Baseball in 2006, 2007, 2008, and 2009, inter-hall Basketball in 2008–2009, inter-hall Ultimate Frisbee in 2008 and 2009, and inter-hall Hockey in 2013, 2015, and 2016. Morrissey is nearly always a dorm that competes for the title of best athletic dorm (the O'Leary Cup) mainly based on its consistency in placing on the podium for a variety of smaller sports, such as back-to-back top-three finishes for Racquetball, Dodgeball, Flag football, and Sand Volleyball from 2018 to 2019.

== Notable residents ==
- Johnny Lattner
- Joseph Scheidler
- Richard V. Allen
- Carl Yastrzemski
- Kelly Tripucka
- Troy Murphy
- William Mapother
- Chase Claypool
- Liam Eichenberg
- Zack Martin
- Chris Quinn
- Thomas M. Hardiman

== Other sources ==
- Irish Legends
- Notre Dame Office of Residence Life and Housing Profile
