= Sorin Hall (University of Notre Dame) =

Student dormitory at the University of Notre Dame

- Residence Hall
- University of Notre Dame
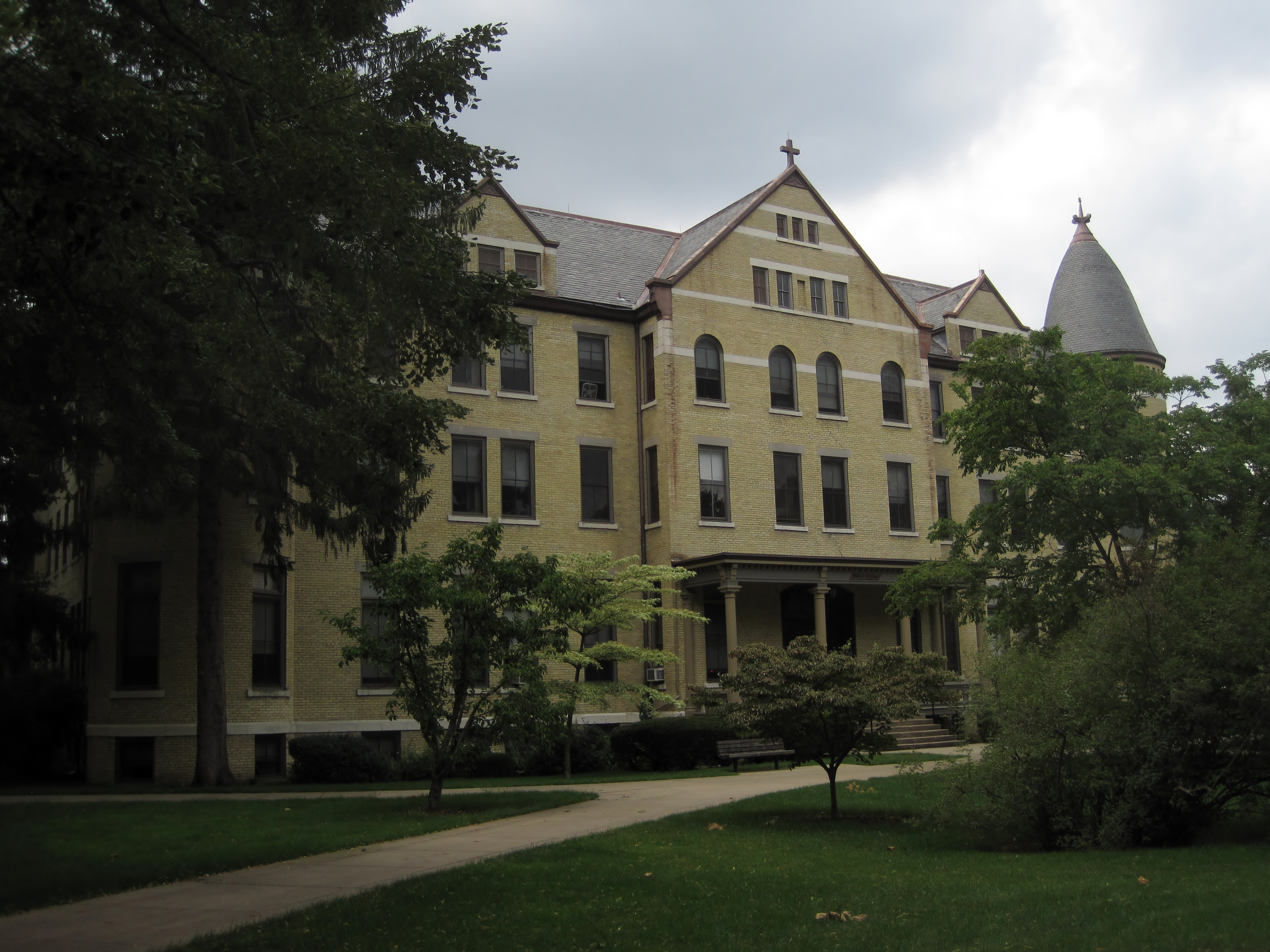
- Sorin Hall

- Coat of arms of Sorin Hall; Arms: Azure a chevron or between in chief dexter a sun or and in chief sinister an escallop Argent and in base a crown proper, on a chief flory-counter-flory Or an otter proper
- Campus quad: Main (God)
- Coordinates: 41.701804°N 86.239882°W
- Nickname: Sorin College
- Motto: Frater Pro Fratre (Latin)
- Motto in English: Brother for Brother
- Established: 1888
- Named for: The Very Rev. Edward Sorin
- Former names: Collegiate Hall
- Architect: Willoughby J. Edbrooke and Franklin Pierce Burnham
- Architectural style: Châteauesque
- Colors: Blue and Gold
- Gender: Male
- Rector: Daniel Driscoll (since 2022)
- Priest-in-Residence: Rev. Edward Malloy, C.S.C. (since 1979)
- Undergraduates: 146 (Fall 2025)
- Postgraduates: 2 (serving as Assistant Rectors)
- Chapel: St. Thomas Aquinas
- Mascot: Otters
- Sports: Badminton, Baseball, BASE-ketball, Basketball, Bowling, Broomball, Cross Country, Dodgeball, Flag Football (4v4 and 7v7), Golf, Hot Spot, Ice Hockey, Lacrosse, Pickleball, Putt Putt Golf, Racquetball, Soccer (Indoor and Outdoor), Speed Lacrosse, Table Tennis, Tennis, Ultimate Disc, Volleyball
- Charities: Kick-It for Kevin, Otterfest, Catholic Worker, St. Jude Catholic School, Jinja, Uganda
- Major events: Secession Week, Talent Show, Sweater Vest Fridays, Monk Hoops, Sorin Survivor, Mass and Cheese, Graduation Carving, Nugget Challenge
- Website: sorincollege.weebly.com
- Sorin Hall
- U.S. Historic district – Contributing property
- Location within Indiana
- Location: Notre Dame, Indiana, U.S.
- Built: 1889
- Architect: Willoughby J. Edbrooke
- Architectural style: Châteauesque
- Part of: University of Notre Dame: Main and South Quadrangles (ID78000053)
- Added to NRHP: May 23, 1978

Map
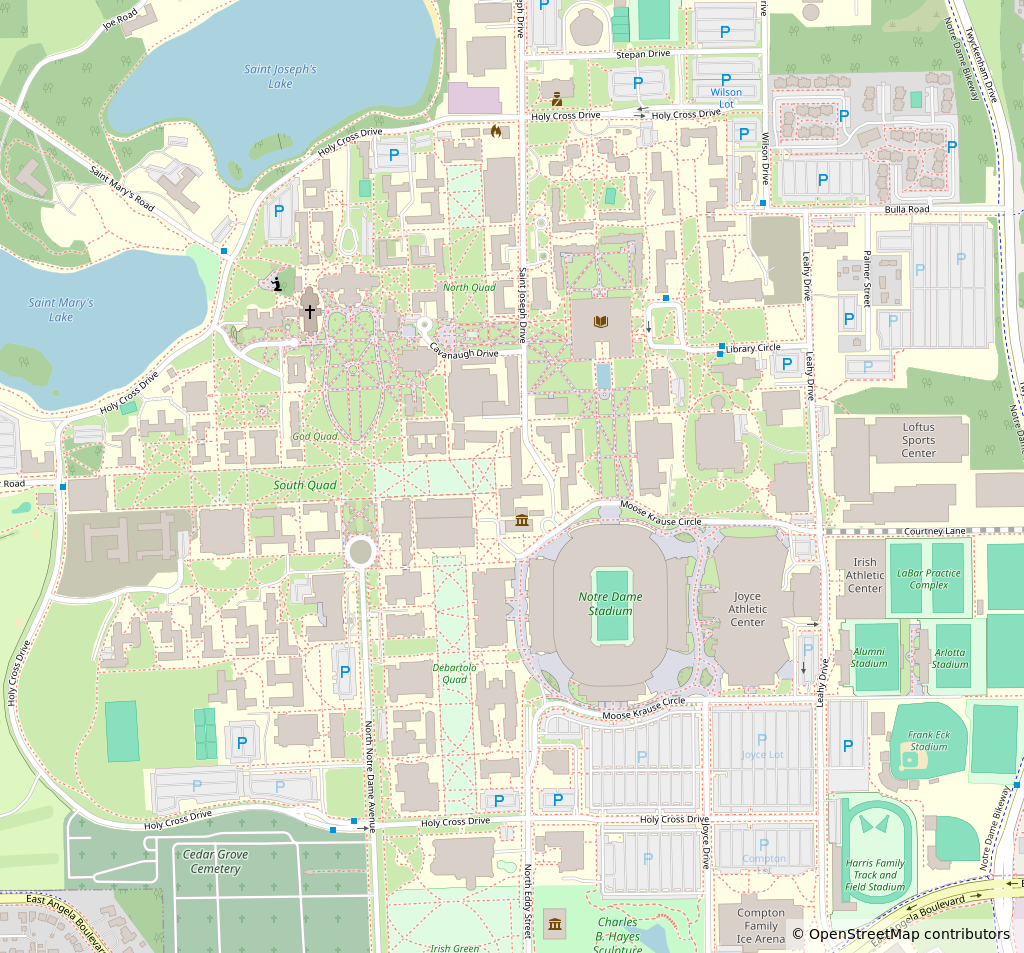
- Location within Notre Dame, Indiana

Sorin Hall, commonly referred to as Sorin College, is the oldest of the 33 residence halls on the campus of the University of Notre Dame and one of the 17 male dorms. It is named after Fr. Edward Sorin, C.S.C., the founder of Notre Dame. Sorin is located directly north of Walsh Hall and is directly south of the Basilica of the Sacred Heart. Sorin houses 143 undergraduate students. Sorin Hall is, along with other buildings on the Main Quad of Notre Dame, on the National Register of Historic Places. Sorin Hall was the first Notre Dame residential hall established as such, although St. Edward's Hall is housed in an older building.

== History ==
Sorin Hall was the first dormitory built specifically to host students at the University of Notre Dame. Prior to 1888, every college student was housed in the Main Building, with open dormitory areas. During the early mid-1880s, the Holy Cross priests experimented with private rooms for upperclassmen with high academic grades and the results were positive. Since the Main Building was overcrowded with students, Father Edward Sorin decided to build a freestanding dormitory to expand residential space for students and alleviate the housing shortage. It was the first of its kind among all Catholic universities and one of the first among colleges across the country.

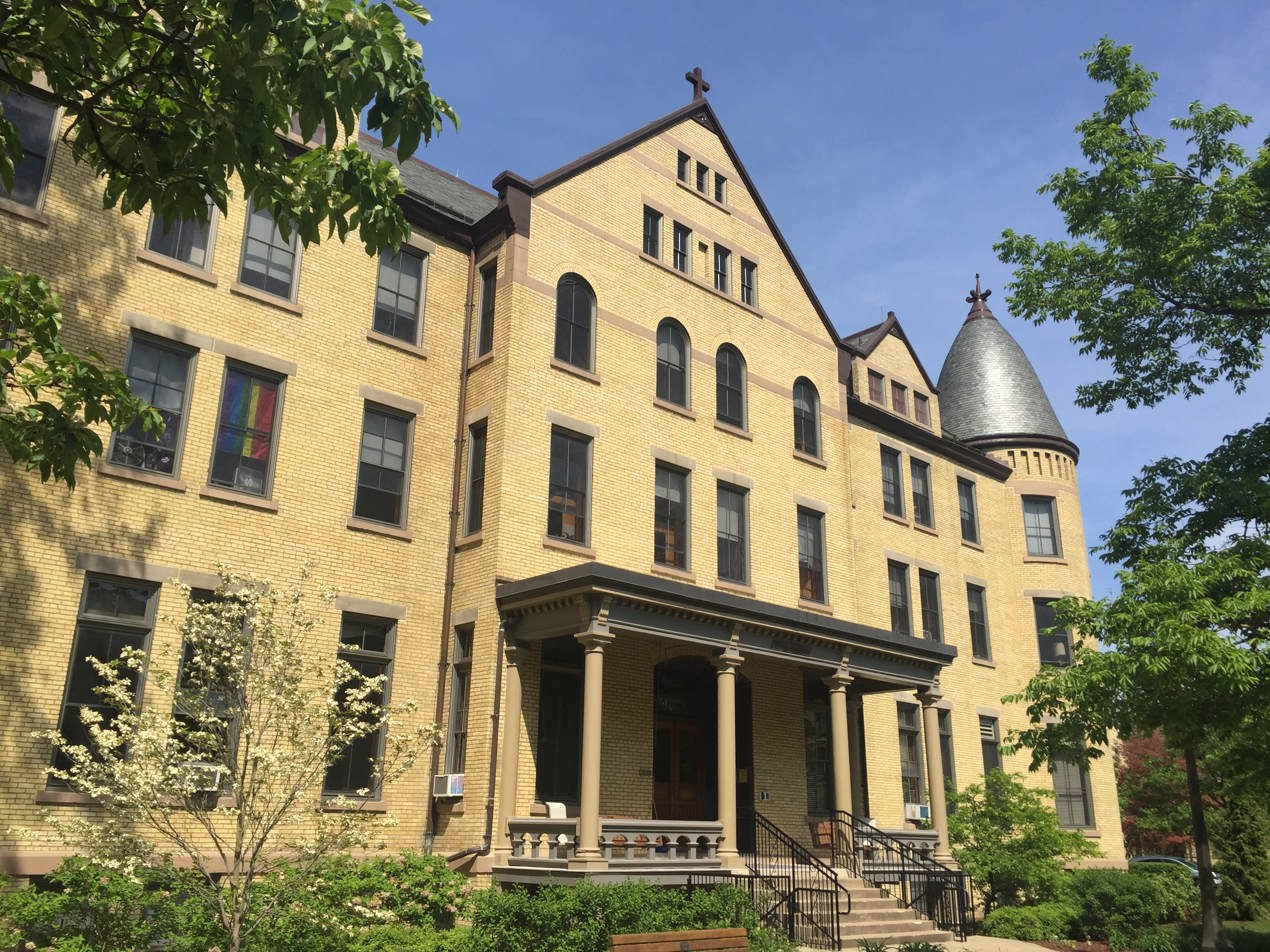
Sorin Hall with its iconic porch

It was designed by Willoughby J. Edbrooke, architect of the Main Building, Washington Hall (1881), and the Science Hall (1883 - today's LaFortune Student Center) in collaboration with Franklin Pierce Burnham. His design has been described as a mixture of Gothic and Roman for a building that resembles a French château. Groundbreaking took place on March 18, 1887, and the cornerstone was laid by Fr. Sorin on May 27, 1888, the 50th anniversary of his ordination as a priest. Originally intended to be called Collegiate Hall, when the cornerstone was uncovered for the ceremony, Father Sorin discovered that the dormitory was to be named in his honor. Construction progressed throughout the fall of 1888 and the dorm opened its doors on New Year's Day of 1889. The 12 January 1889 issue of the Scholastic reported that "The house is replete with all the modern conveniences; and the rooms, fifty in number, are large enough to encourage study, and at the same time small enough to discourage visiting.” The fifty rooms were all singles. The first student to reserve a room in the hall was Joe Cusack, who played halfback for the inaugural Notre Dame football team and varsity quarterback a year later. He chose a room situated at the southwest corner of the hall. Space for the law department, founded in 1866, was situated on the south side of the first floor; classes had previously been taught in the Main Building. The basement hosted a smoking room and a reading room for the comfort of students. Rev. Andrew Morrissey, C.S.C. (1860–1921) was the dorm's first rector. He would serve as the university's eighth president from 1893 to 1905. The rector's room was situated immediately north of the front door. Professor “Colonel” William Hoynes, chair of the law department and one of the early bachelor dons, was housed to the south of the front door. Two seminarians, who assisted Father Morrissey, also resided in the new building. Sorin Hall's chapel, dedicated to St. Thomas Aquinas, was built on the north side of the building. Fr. James A. Burns, C.S.C. was rector for four years.

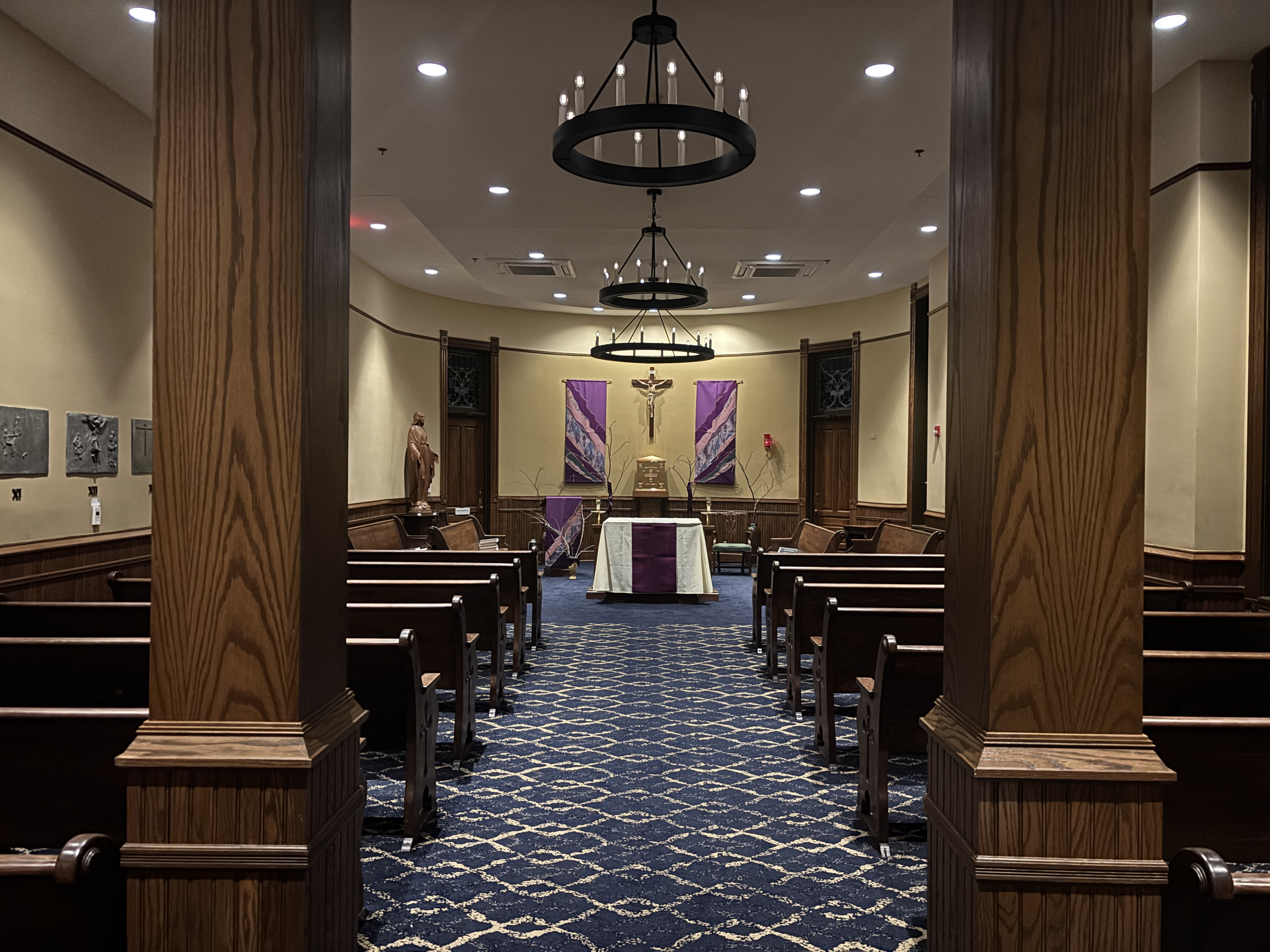
Chapel of St. Thomas Aquinas in Sorin Hall

The structure as it exists today was renovated in 2021 with the addition of the 4th side to completely enclose the building and create a courtyard. Originally, the dorm did not have its now iconic front porch. In its early years, Sorin housed Notre Dame's law school and the dean of the law department, Prof. William Hoynes, resided in the building. He once happened to be the target of one of the numerous student pranks in the early 1900s who dumped buckets of water on people leaving the building. After the instance, he raised a fuss with university administration, hence a porch was built in April 1905 to avoid any such further instance. Since then, the porch thus became one of the iconic features of the dorm. In the 1920s, Sorin hosted most of the school's football players.

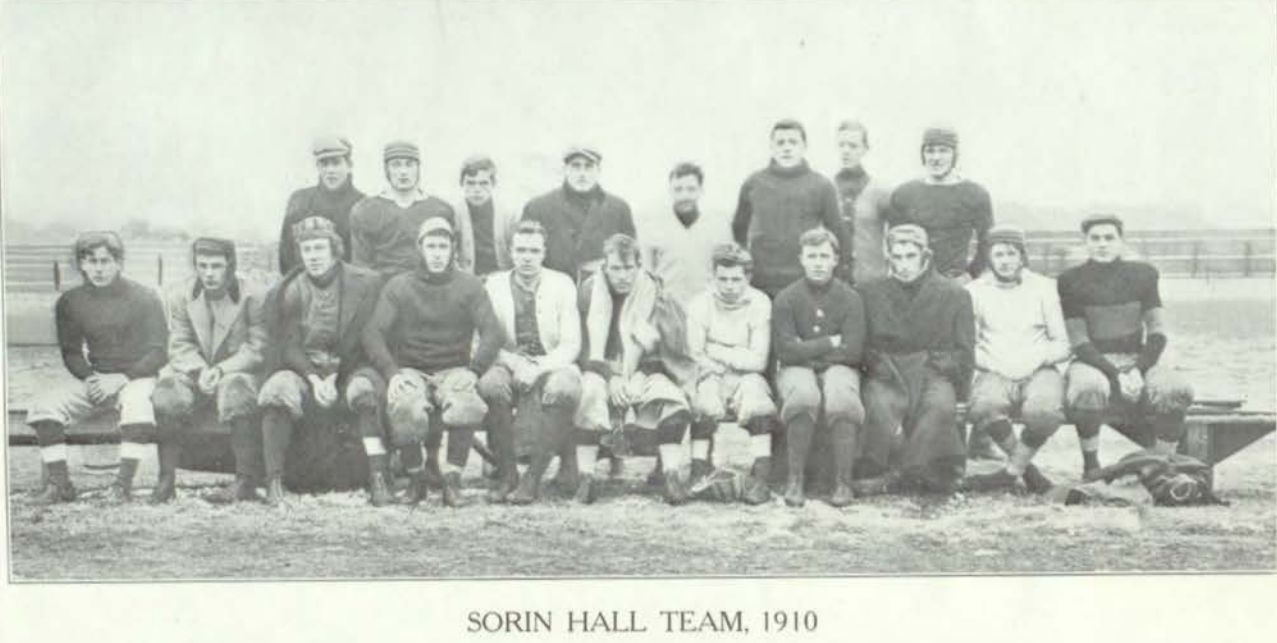
Sorin Hall's interhall football team in 1910

During the Vietnam War, the men who resided in this dorm briefly decided to break away from the University of Notre Dame. Students and professors held classes in the dorm and boycotted University events. They hung a wooden sign above the porch, declaring the dorm "Sorin College." The sign remains to this day and Secession Week, one of Sorin's three signature events, is an ongoing commemoration of this brief rebellion.

In 1988, Sorin Hall celebrated its 100th anniversary as a Notre Dame residence hall.

Notable former residents include former coaches Knute Rockne, Moose Krause, and player George Gipp. All four of the famed Four Horsemen (Harry Stuhldreher, Don Miller, Jim Crowley, and Elmer Layden) lived in Sorin Hall for at least one year during their college careers. Former university president Fr. Edward Malloy, C.S.C. has resided in the hall since 1979.

The coat of arms features a blue field with a chevron between a sun, a scallop, and a crown and an otter on a chief flory-counter-flory.

== Traditions ==
- Secession Week: Every spring, the hall celebrates its transformation into a college with a week of various celebrations.
- Talent Show: Annual showcase of the wide variety of talents among the residents.
- Kick-It for Kevin: Annual kickball tournament raising money for Alex's Lemonade Stand Foundation in memory of former Sorin resident Kevin Healey, who died from cancer in 2009.
- Otterfest: To celebrate the newly renovated building, the hall launched "Otterfest", an annual Sorin courtyard music festival highlighting bands and soloists from both Sorin and other residence halls.
- Sweater Vest Fridays: Students wear Sorin-branded sweater vests on certain Fridays each month to show their dorm pride.
- Monk Hoops: On Monday evenings, students play basketball at various locations on campus. Formerly led by Priest-in-Residence, Monk Malloy, but no longer in order to protect his knees.
- Sorin Survivor: Starting in early fall every year, Sorin freshmen compete in an elimination-style, two-semester-long trial of tribal challenges to determine who is the Sorin champion, modeled after the Survivor television franchise.
- Mass and Cheese: Celebrated each Thursday, residents and guests enjoy 10 p.m. mass and then eat macaroni and cheese together in the lounge afterward.
- Catholic Worker: On the first Saturday of each month, students can volunteer to help those in need in the South Bend community.
- Graduation Carving: Upon graduation, seniors carve their initials into the brick on the front porch.

=== Fr. Sorin's statue ===
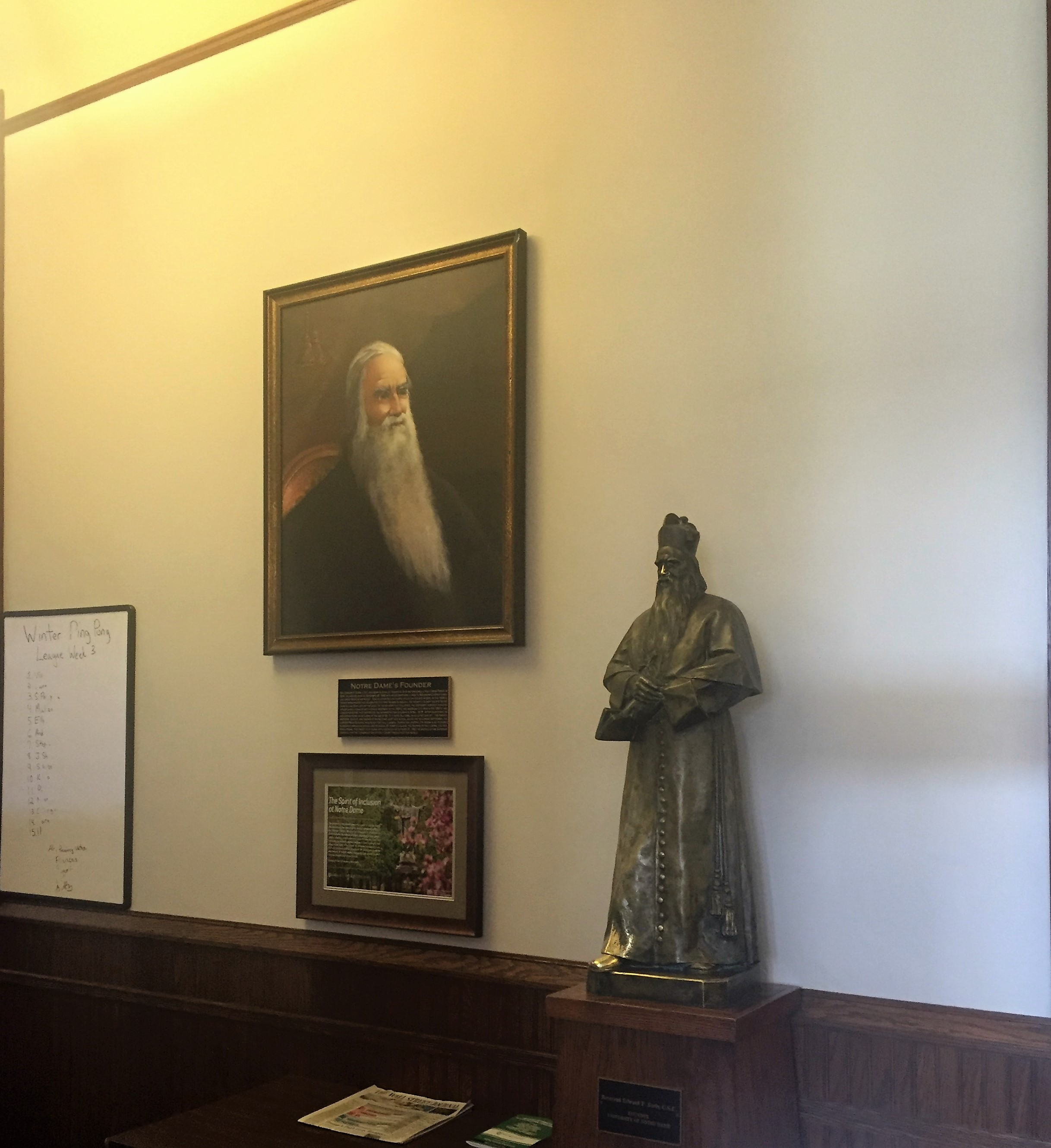
The statue and portrait of Fr. Sorin at the Entrance

A bronze statue of Fr. Sorin resides in the front hallway. It is a replica of the large statue that was dedicated on the Main Quad on 3 May 1906. Sorin residents rub his right foot for good luck when they pass by it. The statue has been the target of a number of Sorin resident pranks and would often disappear for short periods of time. In January 1953, the statue went missing just before the Christmas break and the Student Senate resolved to find the statue. "Although traditionally a wanderer on the ND campus, Father Sorin's present disappearance has lasted so long that concern is arising that it may be a permanent one" [Scholastic issue 01/16/1953, page 13]. Shortly thereafter, postcards and letters began coming in from around the world supposedly sent by the statue itself. The statue claimed to have attended some of the year's most important events such as Dwight D. Eisenhower's Inauguration, Queen Elizabeth II's Coronation, and Joseph Stalin's funeral. The mystery persisted, until just before Commencement 1953, the statue arrived at Main Circle in a cab surrounded by a cheering crowd. Alumnus Camillus Witzieben had found the statue in the snow, and instead of returning the statue to Sorin Hall, Witzieben and his friend August Manier buried the statue in a sand trap on the Golf Course and later moved it to a house in Chicago until its triumphant return. In the meantime, their military friends sent them postcards from a variety of destinations around the world. In 1955, the statue was brought to the Kentucky Derby and sent a telegram to Notre Dame saying that he 'lost it all on Nashua' and was 'returning home' that night at 8 o'clock. The statue returned once again by car to Main Circle.

While the statue probably never went further than a Chicago basement, the journeys of Fr. Sorin became known around campus: "I'd heard stories of seniors who took the statue around the world with them and sent back pictures of Sorin posed beside European landmarks, such as the Leaning Tower of Pisa and the Tower of London. I'd heard he'd even had an audience with the Pope, and that he'd returned of the back of an elephant," said alumnus Pat Williams, class of 1963, in a 1984 Notre Dame Magazine article. Sorin's return during Homecoming Weekend in 1962 was the most elaborate of all: dangling from a helicopter and met by Sorinites in togas and chariots.

After graduation in 1966, the statue was taken by a student. When a priest, Fr. Burtachell, learned of its whereabouts, the statue was returned to campus in 1972 under the priest's direct supervision. When the hall was renovated in 1983, Burtachell returned the statue to Sorin Hall under better security. The hollow statue was filled with concrete and connected to a base with steel rods, which were in turn soldered to the floor in the main entrance.

=== Other traditions ===
Sorin Hall, led by president Aidan McKiernan and vice president Tristan Hunt, began boycotting Notre Dame pep rallies in the fall of 2008. The Otters stated that this was in protest of changes to the rally format brought on by commercialization and a desire to include alumni in what was once mainly a student activity. Instead of attending the rally, the Otters would wait outside and cheer the team as it went in.

Sorin does not have any natural rivals among the men's residence halls on campus, due to its location and tradition of independence. In contrast to other men's dorms, with their chants of "[men's dorm] loves [women's dorm]" Otters chant "Sorin loves Sorin."

Sorin is the only dormitory on campus to have its own walking tour, highlighting many of the historically interesting rooms and areas that throughout the course of its history have either been the home to important Notre Dame individuals, as with room 011, the "Captain's Corner," or institutions, as with the first-floor wing that at one time housed Notre Dame Law School. Additionally, Sorin is the only dorm to boast its own boxing practice room. Many Otters participate in Bengal Bouts, the university boxing program that raises money for Notre Dame charities in Bangladesh.

=== Eddy's Late Night Eats ===
In 2022, as part of the hall's extensive renovation, a student-operated food sales establishment was introduced in the 1st-floor lounge, offering a convenient dining option for Notre Dame students. Named "Eddy's Late Night Eats" in honor of Edward Sorin, the food sales caters to late-night cravings, operating during the hours of 11:00 p.m. to 2:00 a.m. on Fridays and Saturdays.

== Notable former residents ==
- Hunk Anderson
- John Bellairs
- Steve Beuerlein
- Pete Bevacqua
- Rocky Bleier
- Wyatt Borso
- James A. Burns, C.S.C.
- Dave Casper
- Tom Clements
- Stan Cofall
- Jim Crowley
- Joe Cusack
- Gus Dorais
- Jordan Faison
- Gabby Gabreski
- Pat Garrity
- George Gipp
- Bob Gladieux
- Chet Grant
- Andy Heck
- Craig Hentrich
- Paul Hornung
- William J. Hoynes
- John I. Jenkins, C.S.C.
- Joe Kernan
- Moose Krause
- Curly Lambeau
- Johnny Lattner
- Elmer Layden
- Frank Leahy
- Johnny Lujack
- Jim Lynch
- Ken MacAfee
- Edward Malloy, C.S.C.
- Creighton Miller
- Don Miller
- Joe Montana
- Andrew Morrissey, C.S.C.
- Hugh O'Donnell, C.S.C.
- John Francis O'Hara, C.S.C.
- Edward Prudhomme
- Knute Rockne
- Brock Sheahan
- Hunter Smith
- Harry Stuhldreher
- Golden Tate
- Matthew J. Walsh, C.S.C.
- Jed York
- Chris Zorich

== Other sources ==
- Bellairsia
- The Observer
- South Bend Tribune on Sorin
- Chicago Tribune
- LA Times
