= Badin Hall (University of Notre Dame) =

Residence hall at the University of Notre Dame

- Residence Hall
- University of Notre Dame
- Arms: Argent chape ployé vert, a frog vert, the dexter chape with a palm branch argent, the sinister chape a plier argent
- Campus quad: South
- Motto: Estote Ratio (Latin)
- Translation: Be the reason
- Established: 1897
- Named for: Rev. Stephen Badin
- Former names: St. Joseph Manual Labor School
- Architect: Bro. Columkille Fitzgerald, CSC
- Architectural style: Second Empire architecture
- Colors: Green and Pink
- Gender: Female
- Rector: Amanda Bell (since 2023)
- President: Bridget Duffy
- Undergraduates: 131
- Postgraduates: 2
- Chapel: St. Stephen
- Mascot: Bullfrogs
- Sports: Flag football
- Charities: St. Margaret's House Women's Shelter, HOPE Initiative NFP
- Major events: Badin Breakdown, Polar Bear Plunge, a Conscious Christmas, Walk a Mile in Her Shoes, Set-Up Your Roommate, Badin Formal
- Badin Hall
- U.S. Historic district – Contributing property
- Location within Indiana
- Location: Notre Dame, Indiana
- Coordinates: 41°42′02″N 86°14′28″W
- Built: 1897
- Architects: Bro. Columkille Fitzgerald, CSC
- Architectural style: Second Empire architecture
- Part of: University of Notre Dame: Main and South Quadrangles (ID78000053)
- Added to NRHP: May 23, 1978
- Website: www.nd.edu/~badin

Badin Hall is one of the 33 Residence Halls on the campus of the University of Notre Dame and one of the 15 female dorms. The smallest female residence hall on campus, it is located on South Quad, between Howard Hall and the Coleman-Morse center. It was built in 1897 and hosted the Manual Labor School until 1917 before being converted into a men's dorm. During World War II, it was part of the United States Naval Reserve Midshipmen's School, and in 1972 it became one of the first two residence halls at Notre Dame to host women.

Badin Hall is listed as an historic structure in the University of Notre Dame: Main and South Quadrangles National Register of Historic Places listing. When it was built in 1897, it was the first Catholic trade school in the United States. It is an example of Second Empire architecture. It was named after Fr. Stephen Badin, the first priest ordained in the US and provider of the land where the original Log Cabin was built. Notable alumni include Father Theodore Hesburgh and multiple Heisman Trophy winners. Today, it hosts around 131 female undergrads, who are known as the Badin Bullfrogs.

== History ==
=== Construction and years as Manual Labor School ===
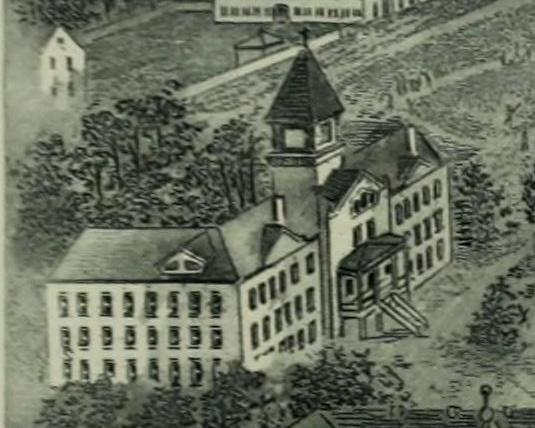
Badin Hall in 1903, before the 1917 addition of the lateral wings

Before the Main Building at the university burned down in the great fire of 1879, it hosted a Manual Labor School (founded in 1843), that was then moved after the fire to a location near currently Walsh Hall. It was the first Catholic trade school in the United States. The Manual Labor School had obtained its charter in 1844, and was under the direction of the Brother of Holy Cross. A few years later, the Manual Labor School was moved on wheels to the present location of Badin Hall. The temporary structure was substituted with brick structure (the one still standing) and renamed St. Joseph Hall, in honor of St. Joseph the Worker, and hosted the St. Joseph's Industrial School' and was opened in November 1897. It was intended to open before the start of the school year, but it did not happen because of a delay in construction. The first floor contained private rooms, a reading room, and a refectory while the second floor contained classrooms, a study hall, and rooms for prefects. A wide staircase led to the third floor, that was used entirely as dormitory. The first director of the new St. Joseph Hall was Rev. Gallagher, who arranged improvements to the rooms and set up a chapel where Mass was said. He provided newspapers and magazines for the boy's free moments. Once enrolled, young men ages 12 to 16 trained to be blacksmiths, bricklayers, carpenters, farmers, and tailors. The goods produced were used by University personnel, and some were sold in South Bend shops.

=== University dormitory ===
Due to the conversion from a profitable institution to non-profit with an academic focus, the Manual Labor School was abolished and St. Joseph Hall was converted to a men's university dormitory in 1917. It underwent major expansion, including two wings that were added at the cost of $20,000, and it was renamed Badin Hall, in honor of Rev. Stephen Badin. Stephen Badin was the first priest ordained in the United States, and was the previous owner of the land on which the university was built. It was opened to seventy freshmen, with the plan of building future wings to host more. A modernized cafeteria was placed in one of the wings of the building. It was the first restaurant on the campus of Notre Dame, breaking a 75 year long tradition of all student eating in the school refectory.

The first rector of Badin Hall was Rev. Fr. Francis McGarry, followed by Florian Flynn. Badin Hall is shaped like an H, is three stories high, and it built of yellow brick and has steep roofs over classical architectural elements, although it has also some elements on the neo-gothic style that prevails in the rest of South Quad. From the very beginning, the men of Badin Hall organized in interhall sports, a trademark activity of Notre Dame students. In the late 1920s, its basement hosted engineering classes before Cushing Hall was built. In 1923, Hugh O'Donnell became rector. In 1931, the university bookstore, previously located in Main Building, was relocated to the south half of the lower floor of Badin Hall, a space that had undergone a variety of uses; first it was a refectory, then a classroom, and then a recreation room for the members of the Congregation of Holy Cross.

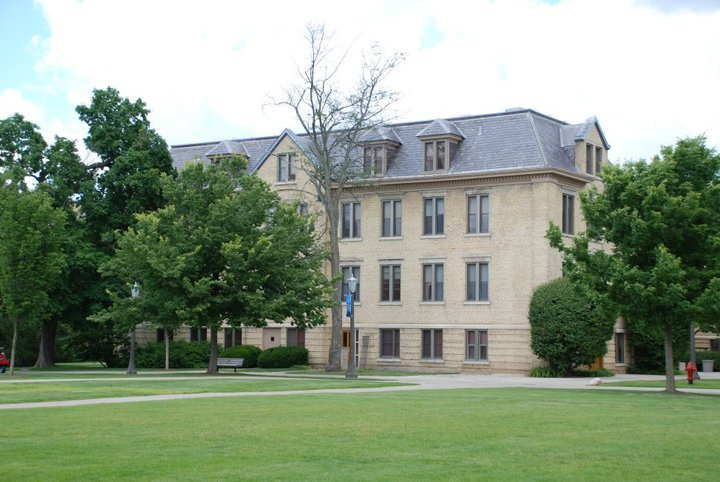
Badin Hall

=== The Navy period ===
In 1942, Badin Hall hosted officers, recruits and midshipmen that came to campus to train as part of the United States Naval Reserve Midshipmen's School. At its beginning in April 1942, the school hosted a 30-indoctrination program for new officers, but it became a full-fledged Midshipmen School in October 1942, and hosted ten four-month courses and more than 10,000 officers. This provided the Navy with space and resources for training, while it helped the university recover from the loss in income and enrollment due to World War II. The midshipman school ended in November 1945, and Badin was returned to civilian student use. When veterans returned to campus after the war, the vast majority were accommodated in Badin. In the late 1940s, when Hesburgh served as a prefect on the third floor, the hall was decrepit. Students would sneak out of Badin Hall at night by stealthy using the fire-escape ladder.

=== Later years ===
In 1947, the Hall celebrated its 50th anniversary, with a ceremony featuring the university president. In 1972, Badin become one of the first two residence halls (the other being Walsh Hall) to be converted as a women's dormitory following the acceptance of women into the university. Renovations for the transition to a woman's dorm included increased storage facilities and more washing and drying equipment. The first rector of Badin as a women's hall was Kathleen Ceranksi. Badin celebrated its centenary in 1997, with events including a speech about his time in the Hall by former resident Fr. Edward Malloy. In 1998 the mascot changed from Badin Attitude to the Badin Bullfrogs. In 2003, Badin won the interhall football championship. Badin became the first residence hall in Notre Dame history to win overall Hall of the Year in consecutive years, winning the prestigious award consecutively in 2010, 2011, and 2012. In 2011, Badin's first floor was renovated to house students for the first time in the hall's history. Badin was extensively renovated in the 2017-2018 year, with air-conditioned lounges and kitchens on every floor, and a larger gym. Renovations included a new chapel, since the original industrial building did not include an apt space; the money was donated by Peter and Nancy Baranay. The chapel features stained glass windows from the early 20th century, donated by alumni Charles Hayes and Jon Ritten and originally designed by Franz Xaver Zettler in Munich, Germany, and restored from an old Chicago convent. The renovated chapel was built in Notre Dame brick, as the main building itself was, that was rescued from the demolition of Brownson and Corby Halls. The residents of Badin Hall moved to Pangborn Hall for the year.

=== Description ===
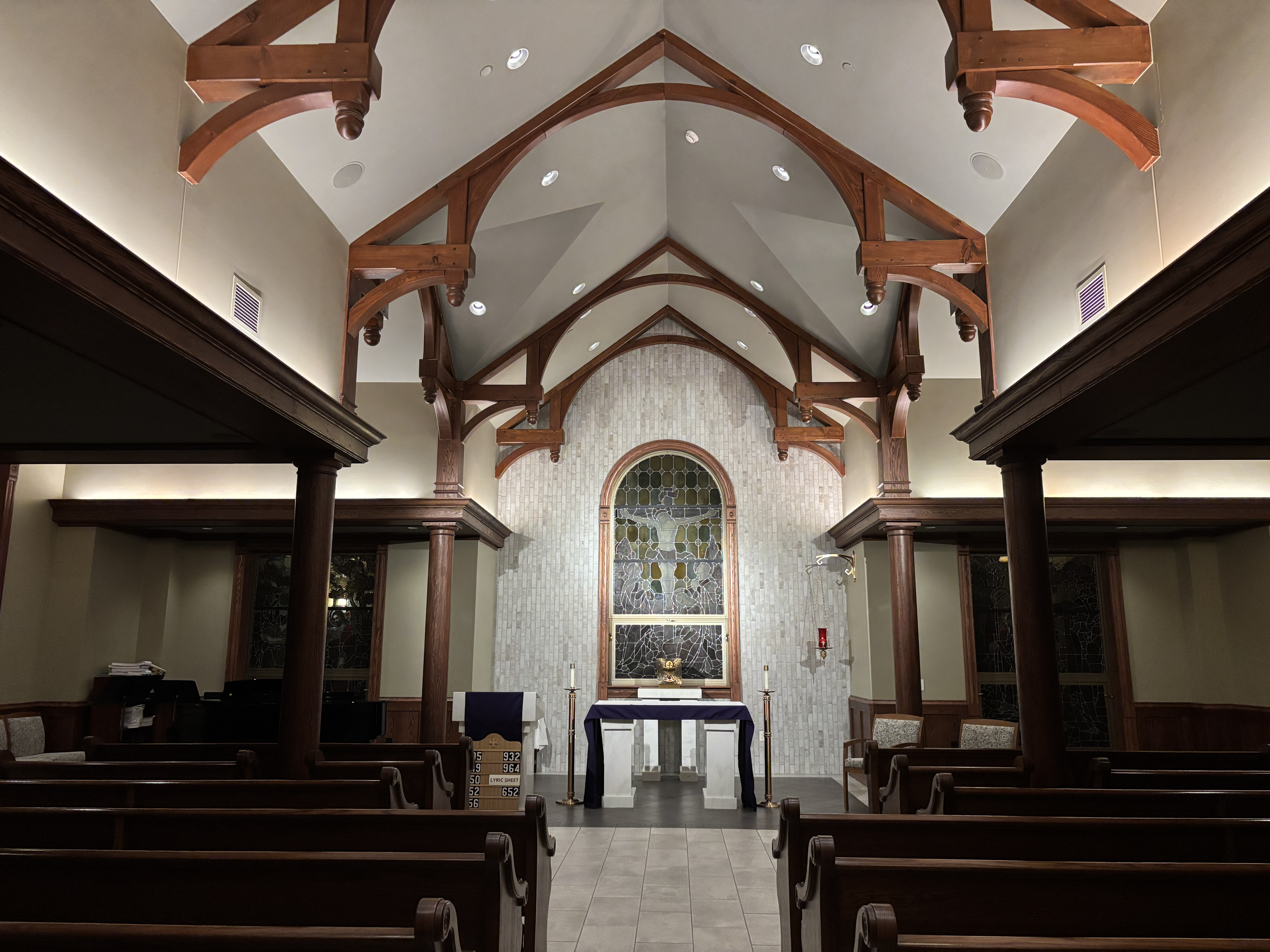
Chapel of St. Stephen in Badin Hall

Badin hall is built in Second Empire Architecture. The hall is H-shaped, with the central portion with a slated roof while the two lateral wings have a mansard roof atop of classical cornices. It is built in yellow brick, three story high, and features a large porch and a balcony on the eastern side. The first floor is entirely dedicated to social spaces (including the new chapel), while the upper floors house the student rooms. Badin is mostly composed of single rooms, and is the smallest of the women's dorms.

== Traditions ==
Notre Dame has an undergraduate hall system based on the residential college system. Each hall has its own traditions, mascot, colors, sport teams, events, dances and reputation. The Coat of arms of Badin Hall features a frog, the symbol of Badin, while the plier represent the Manual School of St Joseph, which occupied Badin Hall, and the palm leaf represents St. Stephen, the patron saint of Stephen Badin and to whom the chapel is dedicated. Badin Hall residents generally make up a very tight-knit community due to the small number of residents. Annual events have included the Badin Breakdown, a large scale karaoke event on South Quad, and the Polar Bear Plunge. Badin Hall also runs an annual event called "Walk a Mile in Her Shoes", in which a race is held for students wearing high heels to raise money and awareness for St. Margaret's house in South Bend. Throughout the 2000s, Badin was well known as the most frequent champions of Fisher Hall’s annual event, the Fisher Regatta.

During the annual hall photo, senior students stand on the balcony (referred to as the Badin Terrace), with younger students standing in front of the hall below. Graduates participate in the traditional “Porch Picture” in their cap and gowns, which they often recreate when returning to campus in future years for reunions. Badin Hall supports the Hope for Nepal charity, which is an initiative that serves Nepal in several ways, including the operation of an orphanage for children who would otherwise be forced to live on the streets. Other events put on by the hall include "A Conscious Christmas" in the winter and the "Polar Bear Plunge" each February in order to raise money for their South Bend charity partner: St. Margaret's House. During the 1960s, a fictional ghost named Harry Hunter was said to inhabit the first floor of the building.

== Gallery ==
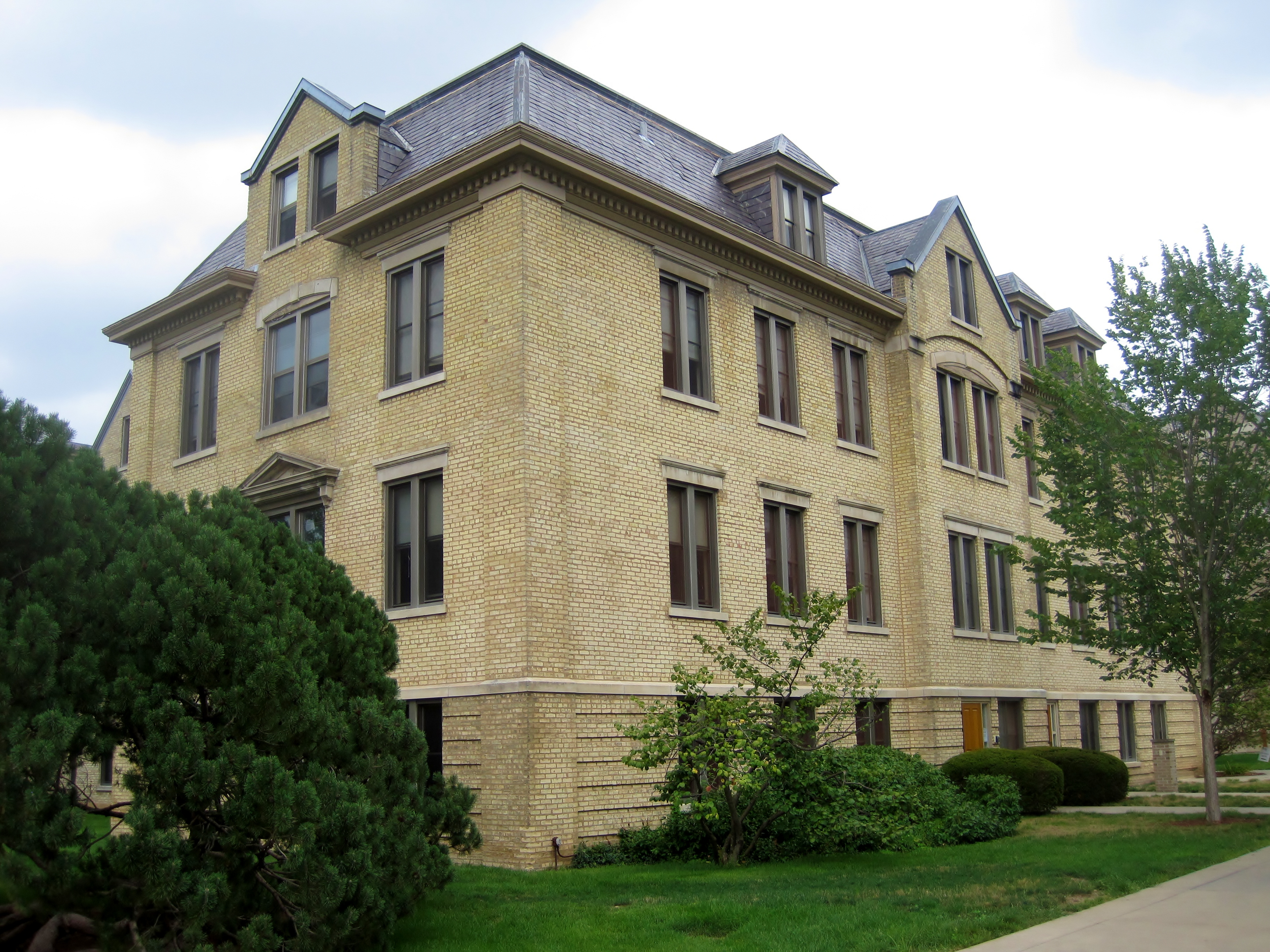
Badin Hall on South Quad

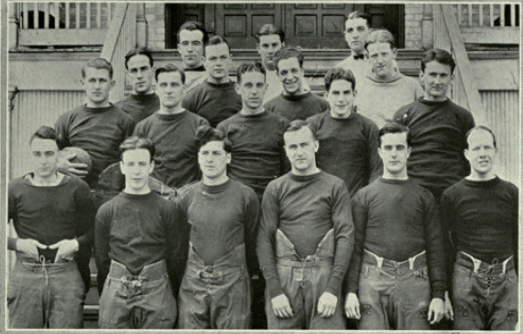
1923 Notre Dame Badin Hall football team, co-interhall champions

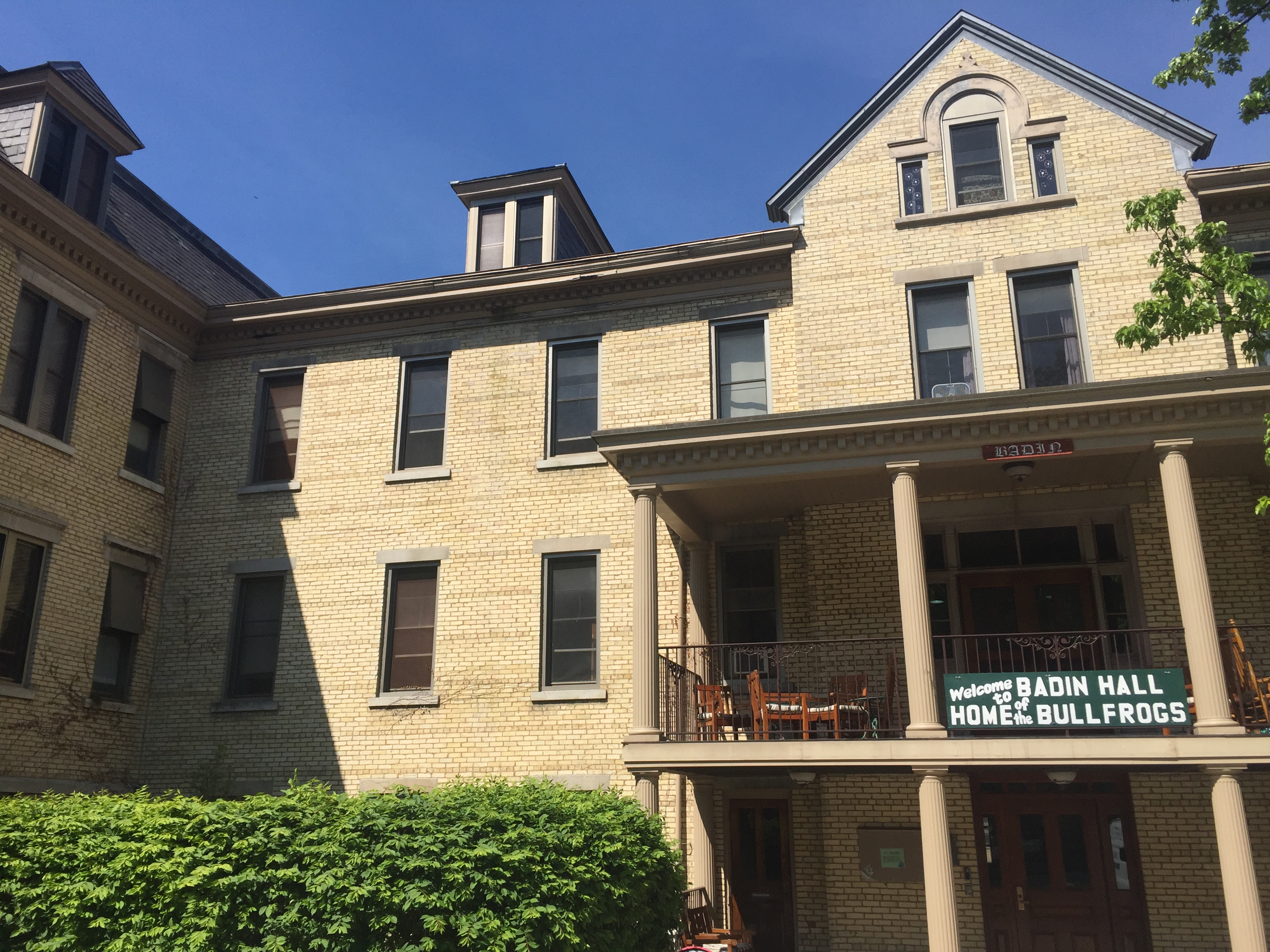
The Badin Hall porch, also known as Badin Terrace

== Notable residents ==
- Angelo Bertelli
- Joseph Lyons
- Father Theodore Hesburgh
- James Burns
- Edward Malloy
- Alan Page
- John Zahm
- Gabby Gabreski
- Lauren McLean '97
- Lee Kiefer
- Debra Cafaro

== Sources ==
- Kelly Hanratty, Badin Hall 1897–1997, Ave Maria Press, 1997
- Badin Hall Profile
- Hope, Arthur J., 1896–1971. (1978, 1948). Notre Dame, one hundred years (Rev. ed ed.). South Bend, Ind.: Icarus Press. ISBN 0-89651-500-1. OCLC 4494082.
- Blantz, Thomas E.,. The University of Notre Dame : a history. [Notre Dame, Indiana]. ISBN 978-0-268-10824-3. OCLC 1182853710.
