= Charles L. O'Donnell =

American Catholic priest and academic administrator (1884–1934)

The Reverend Charles O'Donnell C.S.C.
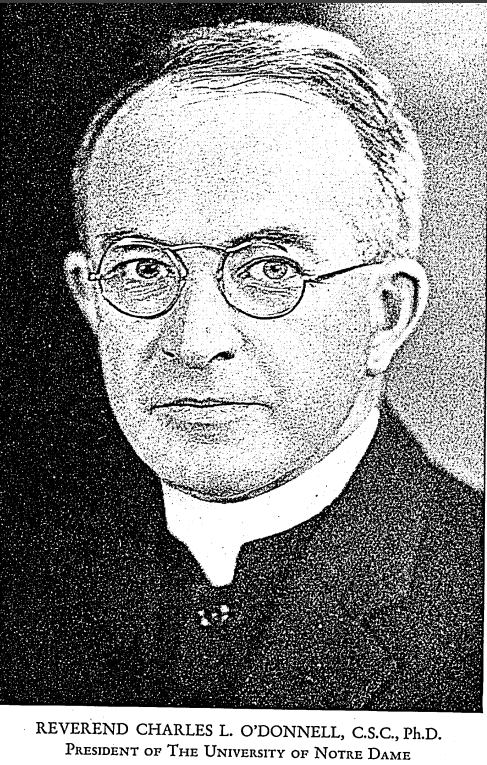
- O'Donnell in 1929

11th President of the University of Notre Dame
- In office 1928–1934
- Preceded by: Matthew J. Walsh
- Succeeded by: John Francis O'Hara

Personal details
- Born: November 15, 1884 Greenfield, Indiana, U.S.
- Died: June 4, 1934 (aged 49) Notre Dame, Indiana, U.S.
- Resting place: Holy Cross Cemetery, Notre Dame, Indiana
- Education: The Catholic University of America, University of Notre Dame

Charles L. O'Donnell, C.S.C. (November 15, 1884 – June 4, 1934) was an American Catholic priest, military chaplain of the US Army and President of the University of Notre Dame from 1928 to 1934. He served as military chaplain in World War I, and his helmet hangs in the east door in the Basilica of the Sacred Heart on the university's campus.

== President of the University of Notre Dame ==
Rev. O'Donnell appreciated both the academic vision and improvements of Cavanaugh and Burns and the practical consideration of Walsh, who greatly expanded facilities, and combined both aspects during his presidency. In 1929, he built Notre Dame Stadium. He also restored Sacred Heart Church and constructed the law school building. In 1931, construction of Alumni and Dillon was begun, in addition to the Cushing Hall of Engineering and a new heating plant. This rapid expansion, which cost the University more than $2,800,000, was made possible in large part through football revenues. Academically, O'Donnell eliminated in 1929 the school for Minims, which created more room for college students. He actively sought distinguished lecturers throughout his presidency and attracted William Butler Yeats to visit campus. O'Donnell also established a new coat of arms and for the University, because he felt that the old one was indistinguishable from the seal of the Holy Cross order.

== Awards ==
| Order of the Crown (Italy) (Italian: Ordine della Corona d'Italia) |
