= Walsh Hall (University of Notre Dame) =

Residence hall at the University of Notre Dame

- Residence hall
- Campus quad: Main (God) Quad
- Motto: Be Strong.Be Free.Be WILD.
- Established: 1909 (men), 1972 (women)
- Named for: Fr. Thomas E. Walsh, CSC
- Colors: Dark Blue and Light Blue
- Gender: Female
- Rector: Cheyenne Schuster
- Undergraduates: 160
- Chapel: Chapel of the Visitation
- Mascot: Wild Women
- Major events: Mr. ND Pageant and ND Dodgeball
- Walsh Hall
- U.S. Historic district – Contributing property
- Location within Indiana
- Location: Notre Dame, Indiana
- Coordinates: 41°42′03″N 86°14′24″W
- Built: 1909
- Architect: William J. Brinkmann
- Architectural style: Second Empire architecture
- Part of: University of Notre Dame: Main and South Quadrangles (ID78000053)
- Added to NRHP: May 23, 1978
- Website: walshnd.weebly.com

Walsh Hall is one of the 32 Residence Halls on the campus of the University of Notre Dame. Walsh is located on Main ("God") Quad, directly south of Sorin Hall and is directly north of the Knights of Columbus Building. It was built in 1909 and the architect was William J. Brinkmann. Among other buildings on the Main Quad of Notre Dame, Walsh Hall is on the National Register of Historic Places. The coat of arms is taken from the Walsh family.

== History ==
It was designed by architect William J. Brinkmann. The cornerstone was laid May 12, 1909 by Archbishop Alexander Christie of Portland in a ceremony where the president of the university John W. Cavanaugh gave a short sermon. Walsh Hall was constructed at an estimated cost of $100,000 It was constructed in yellow brick, as most of the buildings in its surroundings, but its architectural style was more elaborate and decorated than previous buildings on campus. It was three stories in height with basement and attic, with an auditorium located in the basement. It was formally dedicated and blessed on October 31, 1909, by Apostolic delegate monsignor Diomede Falconio.

It was built as a male dorm and could accommodate 104 students, and named in honor of the former president Fr. Thomas E. Walsh. Rev Thomas E. Walsh C.S.C created Notre Dame's first football team in 1887 and was only 28 when he was chosen by Rev, Edward Sorin to be appointed the sixth president of Notre Dame. Walsh expanded the university's curriculum and raised its academic standards. In the 1960s, the basement was home to the Knights of Columbus at Notre Dame, before the Knights of Columbus building was built. In 1967, the hall's rector Father Dan O'Neil, made Walsh into a "stay-hall," where students could live all four years if they so chose. This eventually became the standard model at Notre Dame.

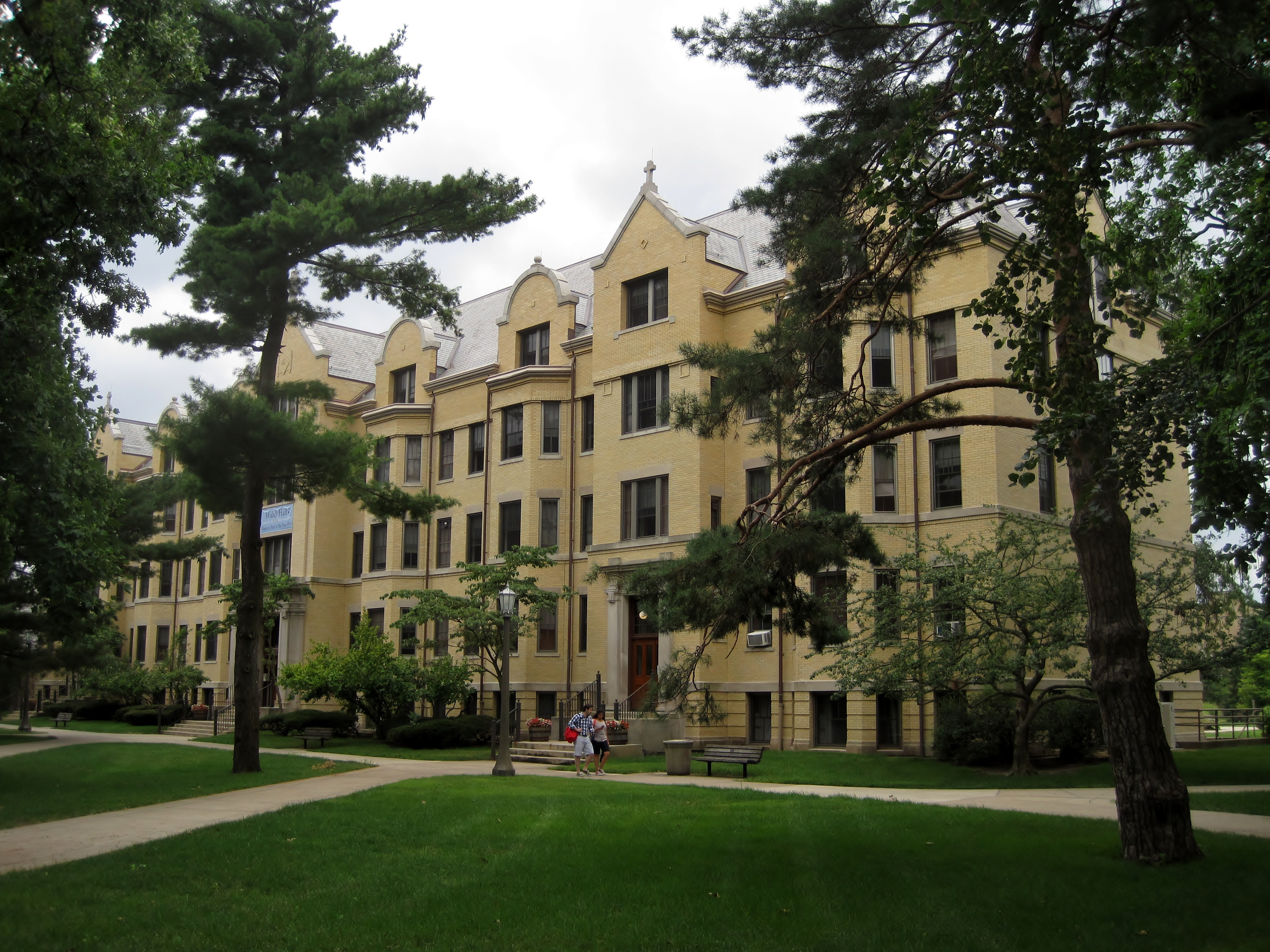
Walsh Hall

During World War II, Walsh hosted the Naval Reserve Officers Training Corps.

When women were first admitted into the university in 1972, Walsh as well as Badin Hall were converted to female halls.

In 2009, it celebrated it 100th anniversary with events featuring alumni and current residents, a documentary, and with speeches by and reflections by Rev. Theodore Hesburgh and others.

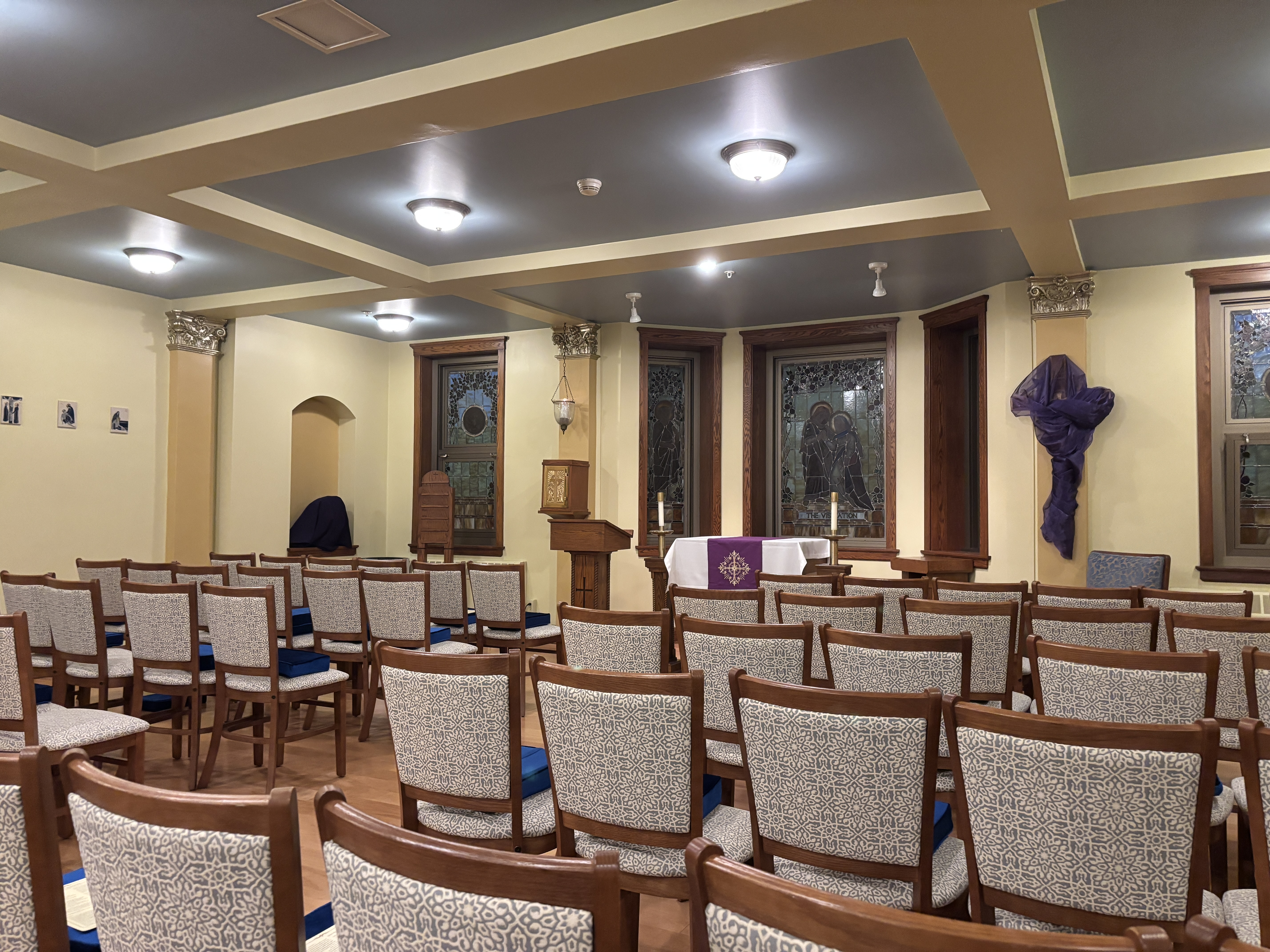
Chapel of Our Lady of the Visitation in Walsh Hall

Walsh Hall's chapel was renovated in 2012-2013 and is dedicated to the Visitation. During the renovations, stained glass windows featuring the Visitation of Mary to Elizabeth were installed.

In 2016, it was announced that the residents of Walsh Hall would live temporarily in Pangborn Hall for the 2016-2017 year while Walsh Hall underwent the most significant renovations any residence hall had until that time, taking a full year. The move was met with mixed responses, with some criticism. The renovation included new piping and plumbing, additional lounges with full kitchens, new elevators and restrooms, and important accessibility options.

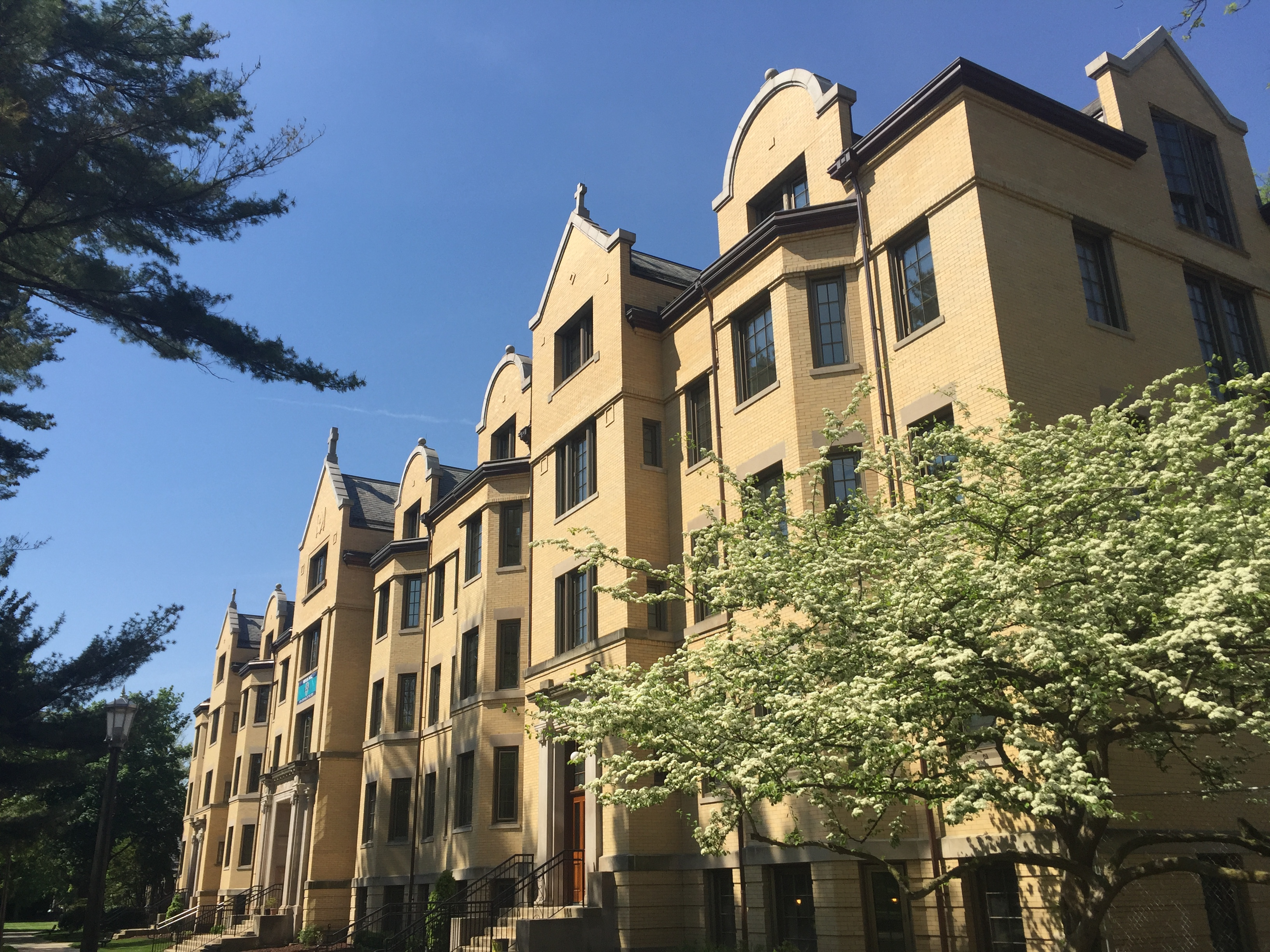
Walsh Hall front on Main Quad

== Honors and awards ==
In 2011, Walsh was awarded with "Best Freshmen Orientation Program" and "Women's Hall of the Year". 2012 saw Walsh claim the championship in Interhall Lacrosse and in the Dorm Energy Competition. In 2013, Walsh took trips to the Interhall Championships for both Flag Football and Lacrosse, won Brother-Sister Hall of the year, and broke a record at Washington Hall for highest attendance at a student event with the Mr. ND Pageant. In 2014–15, the Wild Women were recognized for creating the Best New Event for "Pie Your President," the Best Diversity Event for the "I AM WILD" Photo Campaign, and "Brother-Sister Dorm of the Year" with Dillon Hall (again). Walsh rounded out that year by winning the Interhall Lacrosse Championship and garnering the much coveted "Hall of the Year" award bestowed by the Hall President's Council. In the 2015–2016 and 2017–2018 academic years, they were again named "Women's Hall of the Year", earning the residents a dance under the dome of the main building for each title.

== Notable residents ==
- Austin Carr
- Jim Seymour
- Terry Hanratty
- Theodore Hesburgh
- Eric Wieschaus
- Tom Demetrio
- Michelle McNamara '92
- J.J. Philbin
- Hannah Storm
