= Thomas E. Walsh =

Irish-Canadian Catholic priest

The Reverend Thomas E. Walsh C.S.C.
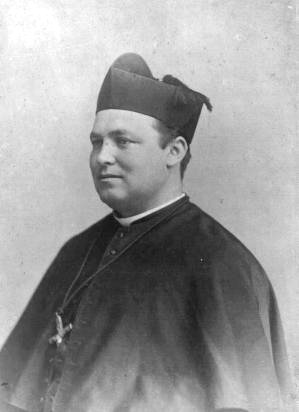

6th President of the University of Notre Dame
- In office 1881–1893
- Preceded by: William Corby
- Succeeded by: Andrew Morrissey

Personal details
- Born: May 15, 1853 Lacolle, Quebec, Canada
- Died: July 17, 1893 (aged 40)
- Resting place: Holy Cross Cemetery, Notre Dame, Indiana

Thomas Edward Walsh, C.S.C. (May 15, 1853 – July 17, 1893) was an Irish-Canadian Catholic priest who served as president of the University of Notre Dame from 1881 to 1893.

== Early life and education ==
Walsh was born one of nine in Lacolle, Quebec, son of Thomas Walsh and Winifred McDermott. He was educated at the College de Saint-Laurent, where he caught the attention of Fr Edward Sorin, who saw his potential. He finished his studies there in 1872 and entered the Novitiate. Sorin sent him to study at College de Ste. Croix in Neuilly, close to Paris, where he spent three years.

== Service at Notre Dame ==
He was recalled to Notre Dame in 1876 in order to improve enrollment. He was ordained a priest on August 29, 1877, by Bishop Joseph Dwenger of Fort Wayne and then assumed the role of dean of students. After the great fire of 1879, Walsh was in charge of rescheduling classes and professors in the newly reopened college, and his administrative ability led Sorin and William Corby to pick him as next president in 1881.

=== President ===
As president, Walsh interest was in bolstering Notre Dame's scholastic reputation and standards. At the time, many students came to Notre Dame for its business courses only, and did not graduate. He started a "Belles Lettres" programs and invited many notable lay intellectuals to campus, including Maurice Francis Egan, and started reconstructing the library which was lost in the fire.

Walsh reorganized the law school and in 1882 he built the Science Hall. He also built Sorin Hall which was the first freestanding residence hall on campus and one of the first in the country to have private rooms for students. Walsh was initially against this innovation, as he believed private rooms would lead to disciplinary issues, but this project was championed by Sorin and John Zahm. During his tenure, Notre Dame started its football program and started awarding the Laetare Medal.

He died of kidney disease at the age of 40.

== Legacy ==
Walsh Hall at the University of Notre Dame was dedicated in his honor.
