= Robert Dowd =

Robert Dowd may refer to:

- Robert A. Dowd, president of the University of Notre Dame, 2024–present
- Robert Dowd (artist) (1936–1996), American artist
- Robert Dowd (ice hockey) (born 1988), English ice hockey player
