= List of presidents of the University of Notre Dame =

President of the University of Notre Dame
- Seal of the University
- Incumbent; Robert A. Dowd since June 1, 2024
- University of Notre Dame
- Residence: Notre Dame, Indiana
- Appointer: Board of Trustees
- Formation: January 14, 1844
- First holder: Edward Sorin
- Website: president.nd.edu

The president of the University of Notre Dame is the chief administrator of the university. The president is selected by the board of trustees of the university, which has the general power of governance of the institution, and is second only to the university fellows. The president of the university is ex officio member of both the board of trustees and the fellows.

The first president was Edward Sorin, who was also the founder of the university, who started his term in 1844 when the university received its charter. Since then, there have been 18 presidents, the current one being Robert A. Dowd, whose term started in 2024. Throughout the history of the university, the presidents have spearheaded change expansion. The longest serving president was Theodore Hesburgh, who first started enrolling women undergraduates, increased the financial endowment, expanded campus construction, and greatly increased the university's academic reputation during his 35 year long term.

The president is selected for a renewable 5-year term by the trustees of the university among the priests of the Congregation of Holy Cross. Many of the presidents have been Notre Dame alumni.

The president must be a priest of the Congregation of Holy Cross, which founded the university. Holy Cross priests take a vow of poverty, so the presidential salary is paid directly to the order.

== List ==
The list of presidents of the university and their terms of service:

1. Edward Sorin, C.S.C. (1842–1865)
2. Patrick Dillon, C.S.C. (1865–1866)
3. William Corby, C.S.C. (1866–1872, 1877–1881)
4. Auguste Lemonnier, C.S.C. (1872–1874)
5. Patrick Colovin, C.S.C. (1874–1877)
6. Thomas E. Walsh, C.S.C. (1881–1893)
7. Andrew Morrissey, C.S.C. (1893–1905)
8. John W. Cavanaugh, C.S.C. (1905–1919)
9. James A. Burns, C.S.C. (1919–1922)
10. Matthew J. Walsh, C.S.C. (1922–1928)
11. Charles L. O'Donnell, C.S.C. (1928–1934)
12. John Francis O'Hara, C.S.C. (1934–1940)
13. Hugh O'Donnell, C.S.C. (1940–1946)
14. John J. Cavanaugh, C.S.C. (1946–1952)
15. Theodore Hesburgh, C.S.C. (1952–1987)
16. Edward Malloy, C.S.C. (1987–2005)
17. John I. Jenkins, C.S.C. (2005–2024)
18. Robert A. Dowd, C.S.C. (2024–present)
