= John J. Cavanaugh =

American Catholic priest, 14th president of Notre Dame

The Very Reverend John J. Cavanaugh C.S.C.
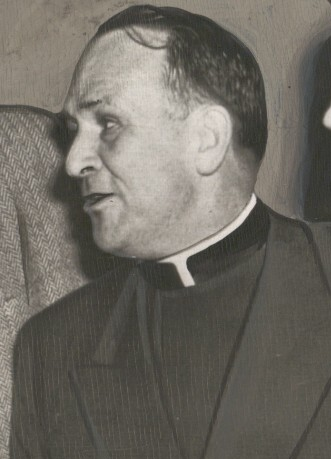
- Cavanaugh in 1949

14th President of the University of Notre Dame
- In office 1946 – June 28, 1952
- Preceded by: Hugh O'Donnell
- Succeeded by: Theodore Hesburgh

Personal details
- Born: John Joseph Cavanaugh; January 23, 1899 Owosso, Michigan, U.S.
- Died: December 28, 1979 (aged 80) South Bend, Indiana, U.S.
- Resting place: Holy Cross Cemetery, Notre Dame, Indiana
- Education: University of Notre Dame, Pontifical Gregorian University
- Profession: Priest

John Joseph Cavanaugh, C.S.C. (January 23, 1899 – December 28, 1979), was an American Catholic priest of the Congregation of Holy Cross who served from 1946 to 1952 as the 14th president of the University of Notre Dame, having previously served as its vice president since 1941.

== Life before ordination ==
Cavanaugh's family emigrated from the tri-County region of southwest County Wicklow, on the Cos. Carlow and Wexford border. They settled originally in Erinsville, Ontario and later trekked to the upper Middle West, settling in Owosso, Michigan. Cavanaugh was a first cousin to the Honorable John Franklin Kinney of Rochester, New York. The Kenney, Cavanaugh, and Keegan families are all native to the region around Coolkenno. As a child, John Cavanaugh served in the choir at Saint Paul's Church in Owosso, Michigan. He assisted his father in the family's grocery store, as well. He retained a lifelong connect to the town, having been baptized, confirmed and celebrating his first mass at Saint Paul's. Entering Notre Dame in 1917, he earned his way through college working as a secretary for Presidents John W. Cavanaugh, C.S.C. (1905–1919) and James A. Burns, C.S.C. (1919–1922). Cavanaugh was an athlete, editor of the student-run The Observer, as well as student government president. In 1923, John Cavanaugh initially entered the automobile industry, working in the advertising department at Studebaker Corporation. He later served as private secretary to Henry Ford. In 1926, he left private industry to undertake religious discernment.

== Ministry at Notre Dame ==
John Cavanaugh then took his master's at Notre Dame in 1927, and a degree from the Gregorian University at Rome, Italy. Ordained in 1931, he was employed by his alma mater, University of Notre Dame. Cavanaugh was then assigned as prefect of religion from 1933 to 1938. Then he served as assistant provincial for the Congregation of the Holy Cross until 1940. In 1940, he was elevated to vice president of the university and in 1946 he was made Notre Dame's president. According to the New York Times, Cavanaugh's legacy at Notre Dame in the post-war years was "devoted to raising academic standards and reshaping the university administration to suit it to an enlarged educational mission and an expanded student body" and stressing "advanced studies and research" at a time when Notre Dame quadrupled in student census, undergraduate enrollment increased by more than half, and graduate student enrollment grew fivefold. Cavanaugh also established the Lobund Institute for Animal Studies and Notre Dame's Medieval Institute. Cavanaugh also presided over the construction of the Nieuwland Science Hall, Fisher Hall, and the Morris Inn, as well as the Hall of Liberal Arts (now O'Shaughnessy Hall), made possible by a donation from I.A. O'Shaughnessy, at the time the largest ever made to an American Catholic university. Cavanaugh reorganized the administration in order to free himself to pursue fundraising activities and to act as a salesman for the University. Cavanaugh's reorganization created five vice presidents, who focused their attention on the various aspects of the rapidly growing University. Father Theodore Hesburgh, at age 32, was appointed executive vice president - the one vice president to whom all the others reported. Cavanaugh also established a system of advisory councils at the University, which continue today and are vital to the University's governance and development. In 1952, President Cavanaugh was required to resign as president in order to retain his position as a superior in the Holy Cross community. But he continued to serve the university as the Director of the Notre Dame Foundation. His successor was Rev. Theodore M. Hesburgh.

== Informal Chaplain to the Joseph P. Kennedy Family ==
During his many years of association with Joseph P. Kennedy, Father John was called on for advice and assistance in times of difficulty. He officiated many of the Kennedy family weddings, said a special Mass in the East Room of the White House prior to John Fitzgerald Kennedy's funeral at St. Matthew's Cathedral, and was one of the three priests serving at the funeral itself.

As spiritual and secular advisor to the Kennedys, Father Cavanaugh also performed other rites for the family. On April 24, 1954, for instance, Cavanaugh performed the marriage of Peter Lawford and Patricia Kennedy at The Church of Saint Thomas More in New York, New York. Some of the 250 guests at the wedding reception at the Plaza Hotel included Greer Garson, Marion Davies, Bernard Baruch, Supreme Court Justice William O. Douglas, Mr. and Mrs. Igor Cassini, and Mr. and Mrs. Morton Downey Sr. He was the personal priest of the Kennedy family and a good friend of John F. Kennedy's father, Joseph Kennedy. John Cavanaugh was Virginia Joan Bennett's preferred celebrant for her wedding to Edward Moore Kennedy in 1958, but Rose and Joseph Kennedy chose Cardinal Francis Spellman instead.

Joseph P. Kennedy sparked up a friendship with Father Cavanaugh when he became a member of University of Notre Dame's Board of Trustees. Beginning in 1958, Father Cavanaugh advised Joseph P. Kennedy on a strategy for addressing American Protestant concerns about the potential election of a Roman Catholic president. In 1959, Father Cavanaugh also advised Joseph P. Kennedy on the hiring of Harris Wofford for the 1960 Presidential Campaign. The future Senator from the State of Pennsylvania was a civil rights attorney then teaching at Notre Dame Law School. Father Cavanaugh, as former president of the University, approached Father Theodore Hesburgh to arrange a leave of absence. Cavanaugh was present with the Kennedy family at Hyannisport in 1960, as they anxiously awaited returns from the swing states of Michigan, Illinois, Minnesota and California in the unexpectedly close Presidential election.

Father John's advice to the Kennedy family included thoughts on the handling of materials censored by the Vatican, as when Rose Kennedy asked for judgments on Victor Hugo's Les Misérables, all of Émile Zola's works, and some tomes by Jean-Jacques Rousseau. But the relationship was reciprocated. When the United States Military Academy uncovered excessive cheating on its Varsity Football team, Father Cavanaugh obtained a special gift from Joseph P. Kennedy to provide Notre Dame scholarships for all the former cadets, under the condition that they play no varsity sports.

== Portrayals ==
Cavanaugh was played by actor Robert Prosky in the 1993 college football movie Rudy.
