= Andrew Morrissey =

Irish-American priest & President of the University of Notre Dame (1860–1921)

The Very Reverend Andrew Morrissey C.S.C.
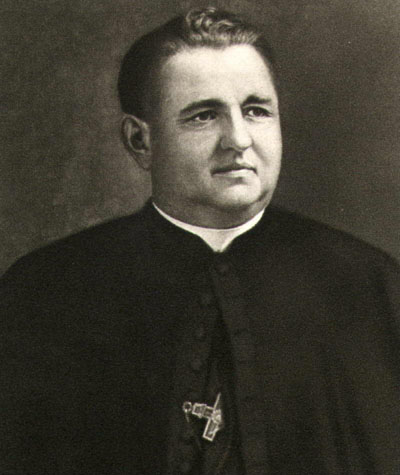

7th President of the University of Notre Dame
- In office 1893–1905
- Preceded by: Thomas E. Walsh
- Succeeded by: John W. Cavanaugh

Personal details
- Born: November 16, 1860 Thomastown, Ireland
- Died: May 27, 1921 (aged 60) Paris, France
- Resting place: Holy Cross Cemetery, Notre Dame, Indiana
- Education: University of Notre Dame

Andrew Morrissey, C.S.C. (November 16, 1860 – May 27, 1921) was an Irish-American Catholic priest who served as president of the University of Notre Dame from 1893 to 1905, after having served previously as director of studies. He was born in 1860 in Ireland, and left for America at the age of twelve. He studied in the United States and was professed with the Congregation of Holy Cross in 1880. He taught at Sacred Heart College located in Watertown, Wisconsin, and was ordained priest in 1884. Morrissey Hall at the University of Notre Dame was dedicated in his honor.

== President of the University of Notre Dame ==
In 1885 he arrived at Notre Dame, where he served as Director of Studies. In 1892, he succeeded Fr. John Augustine Zahm as Vice President, and in 1893, when Fr. Thomas E. Walsh died. On his deathbed in 1893, Walsh requested that Morrissey succeed him as president. Fr. Edward Sorin died on October 31 of 1893, making Fr. Morrissey the first Notre Dame president to serve without the university founder. His presidency saw the construction of the Grotto in 1896, the addition of wings to Sorin Hall in 1897 and the erection of the first gymnasium in 1898. In 1900 student enrollment increased to more than 700, with most students still followed the Commercial Course. During Morrissey's 12-year tenure, the University remained largely focused on younger students in its boarding school model, in line with the vision of Fr. Sorin. Many college students did not graduate, and enrolled just to study the Commerce courses. Morrissey once said, "We can never compete with those colleges that have such tremendous endowments! Our very existence depends on giving Catholic boys a good preparatory foundation." His vision was opposed by Fr. John Zahm, who championed the view of Notre Dame becoming a research university dedicated to scholarship. Morrissey and Zahm were very different men, and often at odds. Zahm was cold, stand-offish, guileless, while Morrissey was warm-hearted, expansive, not altogether impartial. Zahm was willing to go into debt in order to expand the University, while debt was strongly opposed by Morrissey. Zahm was deeply intellectual but no politician; Morrissey, on the other hand, was rather astute.

== External sources ==
- "Notre Dame Archives Inventory: AMM". archives.nd.edu.
- "Notre Dame -- 100 Years: Chapter XVIII". archives.nd.edu.
- "Version 4.1". irishlegends.com.
- ENR // AgencyND // University of Notre Dame. "Fr. Andrew Morrissey, CSC // Morrissey Manor // University of Notre Dame". morrissey.nd.edu.
