= Joe Cusack =

American football player and US Army officer (1868–1930)

- Born: January 13, 1868; New York City, U.S.
- Died: September 4, 1930 (aged 62); San Antonio, Texas, U.S.

Joseph E. Cusack (January 13, 1868 – September 4, 1930) was an American football player and an officer in the United States Army.

Cusack was born into a military family of Irish immigrants in New York City, but as an infant was moved to Fort Stockton, Texas and later to Fort Niobrara, Nebraska. In 1885, he enrolled at the University of Notre Dame and participated in their military cadet training program, achieving the rank of captain in Colonel William Hoynes' Light Guard, Company A.

Cusack played as a halfback in the first-ever football game to be played at the university—an 8–0 loss to Michigan on November 23, 1887. The following spring, Cusack moved to the quarterback position and played two additional games against Michigan on consecutive days in April. The first was a 26–6 loss at South Bend's Green Stocking Ball Park in front of 400 spectators; the second was a 10–4 loss at Notre Dame.

After becoming a member of the first graduating class out of Sorin Hall in 1889, Cusack enlisted in the Army and eventually achieved the rank of colonel. He died in San Antonio, Texas and is buried in Fort Sam Houston National Cemetery.
