= LaFortune Student Center =

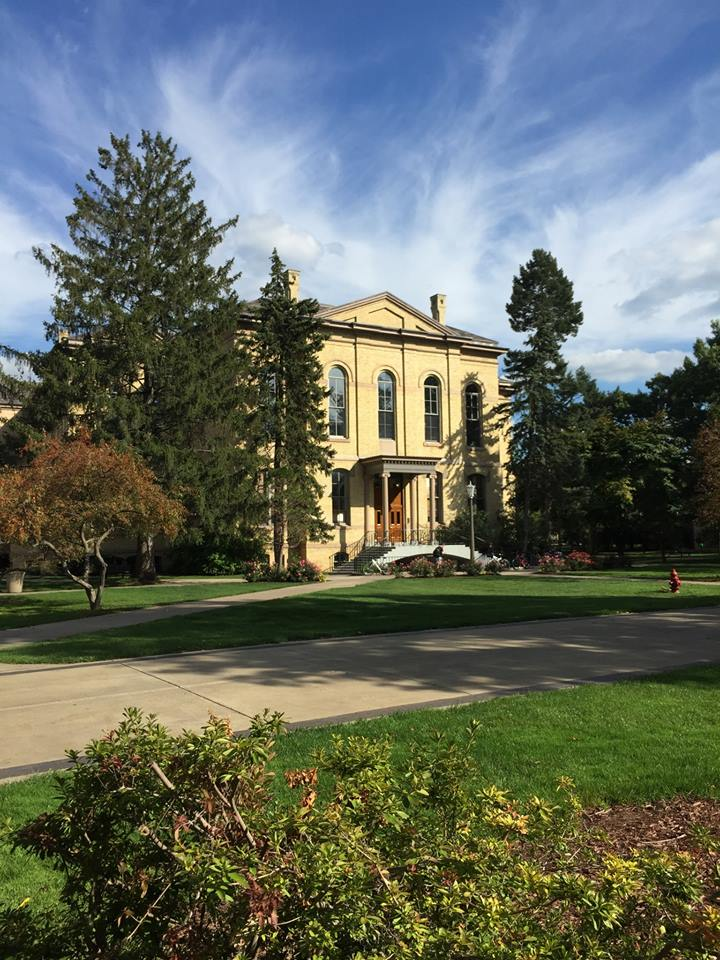
- LaFortune Student Center
- Interactive map of the LaFortune Student Center area

General information
- Status: Student Center
- Architectural style: Eclectic, French Second Empire style, Neo Romanesque, Neoclassical
- Location: Notre Dame, Indiana, United States
- Completed: 1883
- Client: University of Notre Dame
- Owner: University of Notre Dame

Technical details
- Floor count: 4
- Floor area: 83,000 sq ft (7,700 m^{2})

Design and construction
- Architect: W.J. Edbrooke

Website
- lafortune.nd.edu
- LaFortune Student Center
- U.S. Historic district – Contributing property
- Location within Indiana
- Coordinates: 41°42′06.9″N 86°14′17.9″W
- Built: 1883
- Architect: Willoughby J. Edbrooke
- Architectural style: Modern Gothic
- Part of: University of Notre Dame: Main and South Quadrangles (ID78000053)
- Added to NRHP: May 23, 1978

The LaFortune Student Center serves as one of two student centers at the University of Notre Dame (the other being Duncan Student Center). Commonly known as "LaFortune" or "LaFun," it is a 4-story building of 83,000 square feet that provides the Notre Dame community with a meeting place for social, recreational, cultural, and educational activities. The building also houses restaurants from national restaurant chains. As of 2008, LaFortune employs 35 part-time student staff and 29 full-time non-student staff and has an annual budget of $1.2 million. Many businesses, services, and divisions of The Office of Student Affairs are found within.

== History ==
=== Science Hall (1883-1952) ===
Built as the Science Hall in 1883 under the direction of Fr. John Zahm, the head of the college of science, and architect Willoughby J. Edbrooke. The cornerstone, which was laid on June 20, 1883, by Rev. John Ambrose Watterson, was donated by Dr. John Cassidy, Notre Dame's first science graduate in 1865, and contained “lucid and colored quartz pebbles, and was procured in northern Michigan”. President Thomas E. Walsh formally opened the building on December 14, 1884.

The original building was 80 by 100 feet and was made up by two stories plus a basement. Architecturally, it was designed in an eclectic mixture of French Second Empire style and Neo Romanesque with some neoclassical elements such as Ionic columns of the little portico and a somewhat classical cornice with a dentil course below the soffit. The basement housed the engine-room, the department of mechanical engineering, storage chemicals storage, and the metallurgical laboratory. The first floor housed the department of Physics and Chemistry, and a part of a museum. In the back of the museum was the grand staircase leading to the second floor, where the rest of the museum was housed, containing showcase cabinets of natural history, geology, mineralogy, botany, antiquities, and more. The rest of the second floor contained lecture rooms for the geology and mineralogy on the south side and of those for botany, physiology, and zoology on the north.

In 1924 architecture professors Vincent Fagan and Francis Kervick designed an addition to the east side of the building and construction started in June, with the project completed in time for the opening of classes in the fall. The addition contained 24 classrooms and laboratories and was designed to fit into the architectural style of the original building.

In the mid-1930s, Notre Dame built its first particle accelerator in the basement of Cushing Hall, but this instrument was not powerful enough and the university contracted to purchase an eight-million-volt machine in 1940. A vault in the basement of the Science Hall to host such machine and was completed in 1941. When installed, it was the largest particle accelerator built to date and it was on-line by the time the United States entered World War II. In 1944, the Manhattan Project took over the operation of Notre Dame's accelerator, nicknamed the "atom smasher".

=== Student Center (1952-) ===
When the new and larger Nieuwland Hall of Science was completed in 1952, the building was converted to a student union building and named LaFortune Center, after Joseph Aloysius LaFortune, an oil executive from Tulsa, Oklahoma, who donated $135,000. The renovation was directed by architecture professors Frank Montana and Robert Schultz. The new student center featured a main ball room upstairs, a lower lounge, ten meeting rooms, a television room, a movie theatre, the manager ' s office, offices for the Student Senate and offices for the Vice President in Charge of Student Affairs, game rooms, and offices for Campus Clubs. The official opening took place at 1953 homecoming weekend and featured the Sophomore cotillion September 23.

The 1924 addition continued to be used by the science department until 1956. The LaFortune family gave an additional $125,000 for the additional renovation, which featured offices for Scholastic and Dome offices, a second-floor lounge, basement recreation rooms and the new Huddle, which previously was located in Washington Hall annex and opened in its new location on Tuesday, February 26, 1957.

Thanks to an additional gift of $450,000 from the LaFortune estate, the Student Center underwent renovations between 1973 and 1977, which included additional space for food services, and remodeling of the basement and other social areas, and the addition of air conditioning. In 1986, another gift from the LaFortunes permitted the addition of the east wing of the building, facing Nieuwland Hall.
