= John Francis O'Hara =

American prelate

His Eminence John Francis O'Hara C.S.C.
- Cardinal, Archbishop of Philadelphia
- O'Hara, c. 1936
- Archdiocese: Philadelphia
- Appointed: November 23, 1951
- Term ended: August 28, 1960
- Predecessor: Dennis J. Dougherty
- Successor: John Krol
- Other post: Cardinal-Priest of San Gregorio Magno
- Previous post: Bishop of Buffalo (1945–1951) Auxiliary Bishop of the United States Military Ordinariate (1939–1945)

Orders
- Ordination: September 9, 1916 by Joseph Chartrand
- Consecration: January 15, 1940 by Francis Spellman
- Created cardinal: December 15, 1958 by Pope John XXIII
- Rank: Cardinal-Priest

12th President of the University of Notre Dame
- In office 1934–1939
- Preceded by: Charles L. O'Donnell
- Succeeded by: Hugh O'Donnell

Personal details
- Born: August 1, 1888 Ann Arbor, Michigan, U.S.
- Died: August 28, 1960 (aged 72) Philadelphia, Pennsylvania, U.S.
- Buried: Basilica of the Sacred Heart, Notre Dame, Indiana, United States
- Denomination: Catholic
- Parents: John O'Hara & Ella Thornton
- Motto: Ipsam sequens non devias (Following her, you will not go astray)

Styles of John Francis O'Hara
- Reference style: His Eminence
- Spoken style: Your Eminence
- Religious style: Cardinal
- Posthumous style: not applicable
- Informal style: Cardinal
- See: Philadelphia

Ordination history of John Francis O'Hara
History
Priestly ordination
- Ordained by: Joseph Chartrand
- Date: 9 September 1916
Episcopal consecration
- Principal consecrator: Francis Joseph Spellman
- Co-consecrators: John Francis Noll Joseph Elmer Ritter
- Date: 15 January 1940
Cardinalate
- Elevated by: Pope John XXIII
- Date: 15 December 1958
Episcopal succession
Bishops consecrated by John Francis O'Hara as principal consecrator
- Lawrence Leo Graner: 1947
- Hubert James Cartwright: 1956
- Francis Joseph McSorley: 1958

John Francis O'Hara, C.S.C. (August 1, 1888 – August 28, 1960) was an American member of the Congregation of Holy Cross and prelate of the Catholic Church. He served as archbishop of Philadelphia in Pennsylvania from 1951 until his death. He was created as a cardinal in 1958.

O'Hara previously served as president of the University of Notre Dame in Indiana from 1934 to 1939, as an auxiliary bishop of the United States Military Ordinariate in Washington, D.C. from 1939 to 1945 and as bishop of the Diocese of Buffalo in New York from 1945 to 1951.

== Biography ==
=== Early life and education ===
The fourth of ten children, John O'Hara was born on August 1, 1888, in Ann Arbor, Michigan, to John O'Hara and Ella Thornton. His father was a leader of the Irish American Catholic community in Ann Arbor, published a small newspaper and was active in Republican Party circles.

The O'Hara family moved to Bunker Hill, Indiana, two months after his birth, and later to Peru, Indiana, in 1889. He was attending Peru High School when, in 1905, his father was named by President Theodore Roosevelt as the American consul to Uruguay. The family then moved to Uruguay, where young John studied at the Catholic University of Uruguay in Montevideo. He also served as private secretary to Edward C. O'Brien, the US Ambassador to Uruguay.

In 1906, the younger O'Hara moved to Argentina and spent six months working on a cattle ranch. Returning to Uruguay, he conducted market surveys for the US Department of State. He furthered his studies, and then accompanied his father after the latter was transferred to Brazil.

Upon his return to the United States in 1908, O'Hara enrolled at the University of Notre Dame, where he taught Spanish to defray his costs. In 1910, he became a founding officer of Notre Dame Knights of Columbus Council 1477, the first college council in the United States. After graduating with a bachelor's degree in 1911, O'Hara entered the Congregation of Holy Cross on August 8, 1912. He then studied theology at Holy Cross College in Notre Dame Indiana, South American history under the history Peter Guilday at the Catholic University of America in Washington, D.C. and at the Wharton School of Finance and Commerce of the University of Pennsylvania in Philadelphia, Pennsylvania. O'Hara made his profession as a member of the Congregation on September 14, 1914.

=== Ordination and ministry ===
O'Hara was ordained to the priesthood for the Congregation at Sacred Heart Church on the Notre Dame campus by Bishop Joseph Chartrand on September 9, 1916. After his ordination, the Congregation assigned O'Hara as prefect of religion and dean of the College of Commerce at the University of Notre Dame. While at the university, O'Hara fostered the practice of daily reception of communion, then still a newly approved practice by the Catholic Church. He made national headlines when he arranged for two Notre Dame football players, on their way to a game against the US Military Academy at West Point, to receive communion in Albany, New York.

=== President of Notre Dame ===
O'Hara was appointed vice president of University of Notre Dame by its trustees in 1933, and as its president in 1934. He selected the novelist Frank H. Spearman, Richard Reid, the author Jeremiah D. M. Ford, the surgeon Irvin Abell, and the educator Josephine Van Dyke Brownson for the Laetare Medal. After the rise of Fascist regimes in Europe in the 1930s and their persecution of Jews, O'Hara welcomed numerous refugee intellectuals to teach at the university.

US President Franklin D. Roosevelt named O'Hara as a delegate to the 1938 Pan-American Conference in Lima. He was later invited by Venezuelan President Eleazar López Contreras to head a social service mission in his nation.

As university president, O'Hara concentrated on expanding the graduate school. He established doctoral programs in philosophy, physics, mathematics, and politics. O'Hara built a new laundry, the post office, and the infirmary. He also built the Rockne Memorial, Cavanaugh, Zahm and Breen-Phillips buildings.O'Hara strongly believed that the Fighting Irish Football team was an effective means to "acquaint the public with the ideals that dominate" the university. He wrote,

"Notre Dame football is a spiritual service because it is played for the honor and glory of God and of his Blessed Mother. When St. Paul said: 'Whether you eat or drink, or whatsoever else you do, do all for the glory of God,' he included football."

=== Auxiliary Bishop for the Military Forces ===
On December 11, 1939, O'Hara was appointed by Pope Pius XII as titular bishop of Milasa and auxiliary bishop of the United States Military Ordinariate. The Ordinate supervised the training and supervision of Catholic chaplains in the American armed services. O'Hara was consecrated on January 15, 1940, by Archbishop Francis Spellman, with Bishops John F. Noll and Joseph Ritter serving as co-consecrators, at Sacred Heart Church.. A devotee of the Blessed Virgin Mary, O' Hara selected as his episcopal motto: "Following her, you will not go astray."

Roosevelt later appointed O'Hara to the board of visitors of the United States Naval Academy in Annapolis, Maryland, becoming the first Catholic bishop to receive that honor.

=== Bishop of Buffalo ===
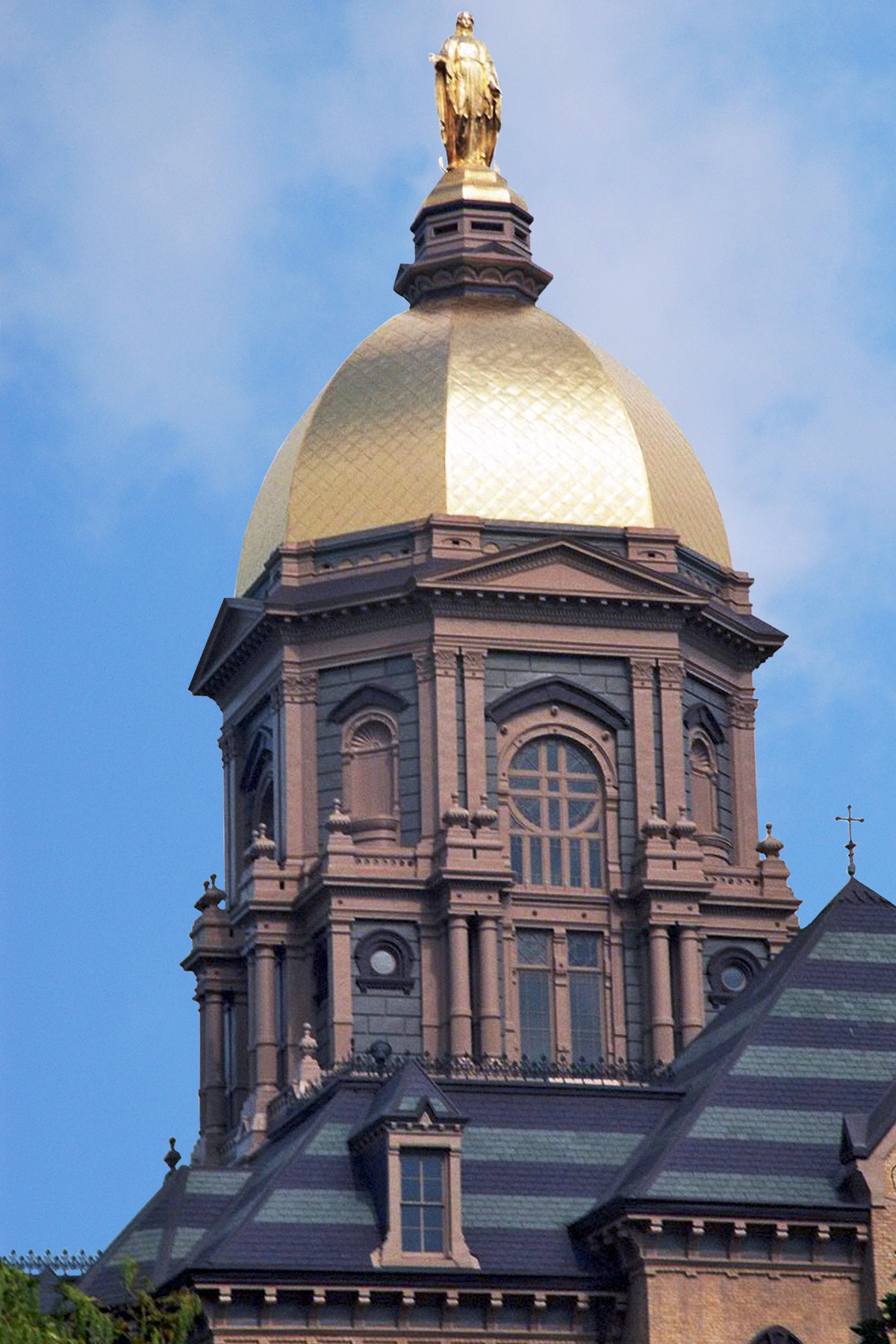
University of Notre Dame, Notre Dame, Indiana (2006)

O'Hara was named the eighth bishop of Buffalo by Pius XII on March 10, 1945, and was installed in Buffalo on May 8, 1945. O'Hara greatly expanded Catholic education in the diocese, and eliminated racial segregation in schools and churches. In 1946, during the American occupation of Japan following the end of World War II, the Vatican sent O'Hara and Bishop Michael J. Ready there to report on the condition of the Catholic Church in that country .

=== Archbishop of Philadelphia ===
Pius XII named O'Hara as the fifth archbishop of Philadelphia on November 23, 1951. He received the pallium, a vestment worn by metropolitan bishops, from Cardinal Spellman on May 12, 1953.During his tenure as archbishop, O'Hara oversaw the establishment of 61 new schools, three women's colleges, and special schools for the developmentally disables, the mentally challenged, the vision impaired and the deaf. Beginning in 1955, he also restored and expanded the Cathedral of Ss. Peter and Paul in Philadelphia.

In 1954, the US Supreme Court ruled against the banning of the 1954 film La Ronde by censors in New York State and the 1951 film M by censors in Ohio. O'Hara commented on the ruling, "In effect the Supreme Court has ruled that the states may label as poison only what affects the body, not that which can destroy the soul." That same year, O'Hara suggested that Catholics in the archdiocese give up films and television for Lent.

=== Cardinal ===
Pope John XXIII made O'Hara a Cardinal in the consistory of December 15, 1958 and appointed him a cardinal-priest. with his titular church the Basilica of Ss. Andrea e Gregorio al Monte Celio in Rome O'Hara was the first member of the Congregation to be raised to the College of Cardinals. His health failing in his later years, O'Hara underwent several operations.

=== Death and legacy ===
O'Hara died on August 28, 1960, following surgery in Philadelphia at age 72. He is buried at the Basilica of the Sacred Heart in Notre Dame, Indiana. The following high schools were named after him

- Cardinal O'Hara High School in Springfield, Pennsylvania
- Cardinal O'Hara High School in Tonawanda, New York

== See also ==
- Catholic Church hierarchy
- Historical list of the Catholic bishops of the United States

Catholic Church titles
Preceded by Dennis Joseph Dougherty	Archbishop of Philadelphia; 1951–1960	Succeeded by John Krol
Preceded by John A. Duffy	Bishop of Buffalo; 1945–1951	Succeeded by Joseph A. Burke
