= Robert A. Dowd =

American Catholic priest and 18th president of Notre Dame

The Reverend Robert A. Dowd C.S.C.
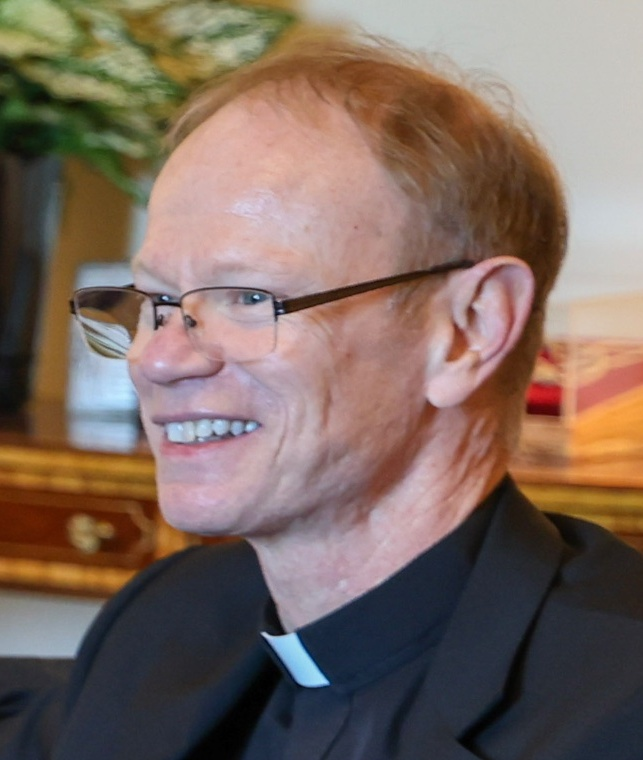
- Dowd in 2024

18th President of the University of Notre Dame
- Incumbent
- Assumed office June 1, 2024
- Preceded by: John I. Jenkins

Personal details
- Born: Robert Alfred Dowd Jr. 1965 (age 60–61) Louisville, Kentucky, U.S.
- Education: University of Notre Dame (BA); Jesuit School of Theology (MDiv); University of California, Los Angeles (MA, PhD)

The Reverend Robert A. Dowd C.S.C.

Orders
- Ordination: April 9, 1994

Personal details
- Denomination: Catholic

Robert Alfred Dowd Jr., C.S.C. (born 1965) is an American Catholic priest of the Congregation of Holy Cross and academic who has been the president of the University of Notre Dame since 2024.

== Early life and career ==
Dowd was born in 1965, in Louisville, Kentucky, to Robert Alfred Dowd Sr. and Norma Dowd Krentz. He has a sister, Mary, 11 months younger. At age 2, the family moved to Michigan City, Indiana, where Dowd ultimately attended Marquette Catholic High School. He earned his B.A. in psychology and economics from the University of Notre Dame in 1987, and an M.Div. from the Jesuit School of Theology at Berkeley in 1993. He was made his final profession for the Congregation of Holy Cross on August 28, 1993, and was ordained as a Catholic priest on April 9, 1994. He later earned an M.A. in African Studies from UCLA in 1998, followed by a Ph.D. in political science in 2003.

At Notre Dame, Dowd served as vice president and Associate Provost for Interdisciplinary Initiatives, Assistant Provost for Internationalization, Director of the Ford Program in Human Development Studies and Solidarity, and the director of the Notre Dame Millennial Development Initiative in the Mpigi District in Uganda, an initiative to advance agriculture, education and health initiatives.

Dowd's 2015 book titled Christianity, Islam, and Liberal Democracy was praised by many and called "groundbreaking" by reviewer Muhammed Haron. In it, he makes the case that religious tolerance in Nigeria and other African countries happens because of a variety of religions, rather than in spite of it.

== Notre Dame presidency ==
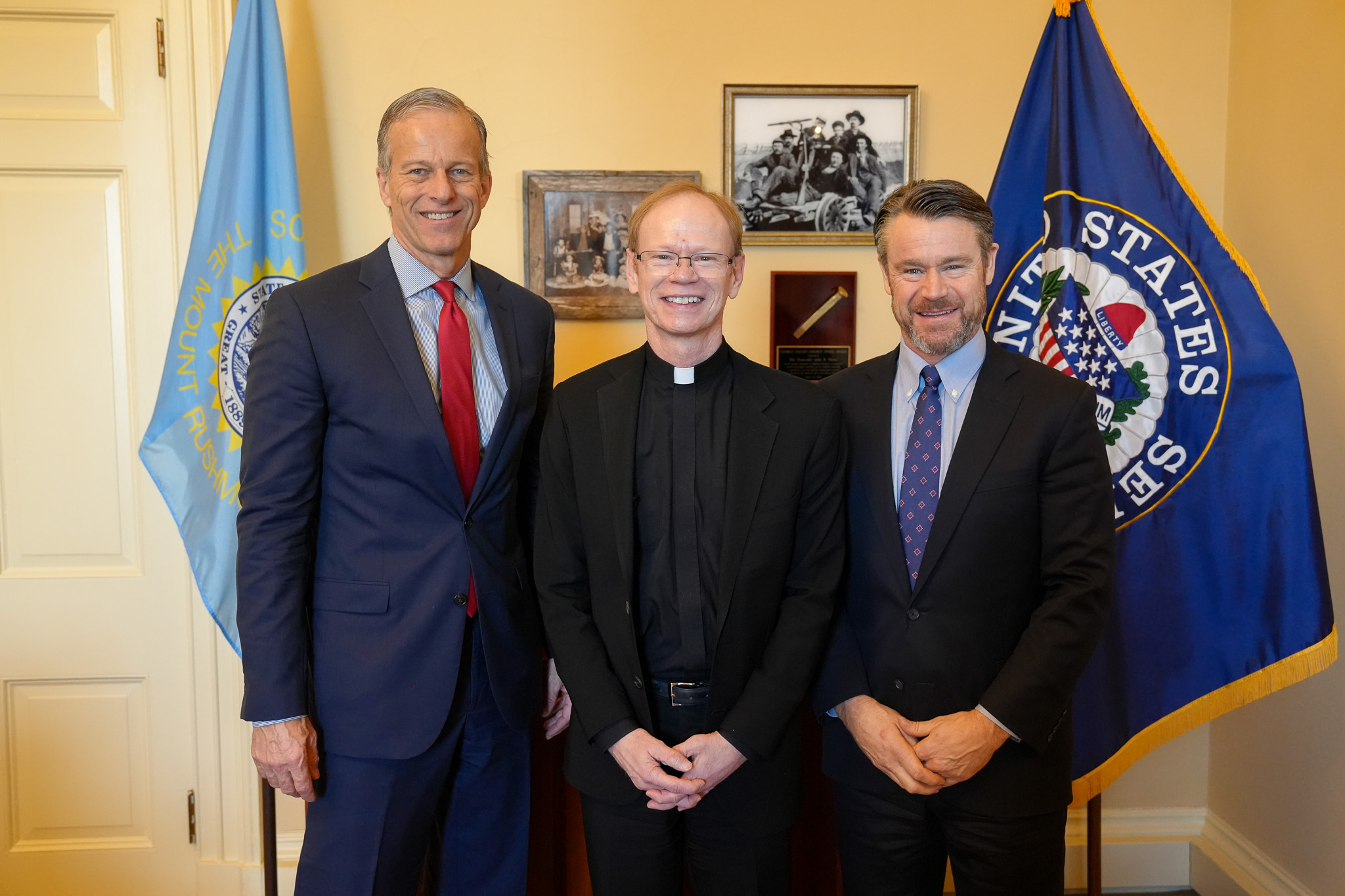
Dowd (center) with senators John Thune and Todd Young in 2025

On December 4, 2023, Notre Dame's Board of Trustees announced that Dowd would succeed John I. Jenkins as the 18th university president, and began his term in that role on June 1, 2024. He was formally inaugurated at the Purcell Pavilion at the Joyce Center on Friday, September 13, 2024.

== Publications ==
- — (2015). Christianity, Islam and Liberal Democracy : Lessons from Sub-Saharan Africa. New York: Oxford University Press. ISBN 978-0-19-022522-3.
