= Thomas A. Demetrio =

American lawyer (born 1947)

- Born: 1947 (age 78–79); Chicago, Illinois, U.S.
- Education: IIT Chicago-Kent College of Law, J.D., 1973; University of Notre Dame, B.A., 1969
- Occupation: Lawyer
- Years active: 1960s – present
- Board member of: Corboy & Demetrio, See Later Career and Boards

Thomas A. Demetrio (born 1947) is a Chicago, Illinois-based trial lawyer.

== Career ==
The National Law Journal named him one of the top ten lawyers in the nation and one of the top ten trial lawyer in Illinois and since its inception in 2005, Lawdragon has named him one of the top 500 Leading Lawyers in America. He served as the president of the Chicago Bar Association and president of the Illinois Trial Lawyers Association. He is a member of the Inner Circle of Advocates, and the American College of Trial Lawyers.

== Later career and boards ==
Demetrio was featured in USA Today, in the American Bar Association Journal and was the cover story in the Leading Lawyers Network Magazine the Illinois Super Lawyer Magazine. and again in the American Bar Association's April 2005 Issue "Catch A Rising Star" Illinois Institute of Technology (IIT) Chicago-Kent College of Law has honored him with its Distinguished Service Award and its Professional Achievement Award. Demetrio is on the board of directors for Big Shoulders, the Center for Disability & Elder Law, and the Constitutional Rights Foundation. Demetrio is also an IIT Trustee.
