= John I. Jenkins =

American Catholic priest and 17th president of Notre Dame

The Reverend John I. Jenkins C.S.C.
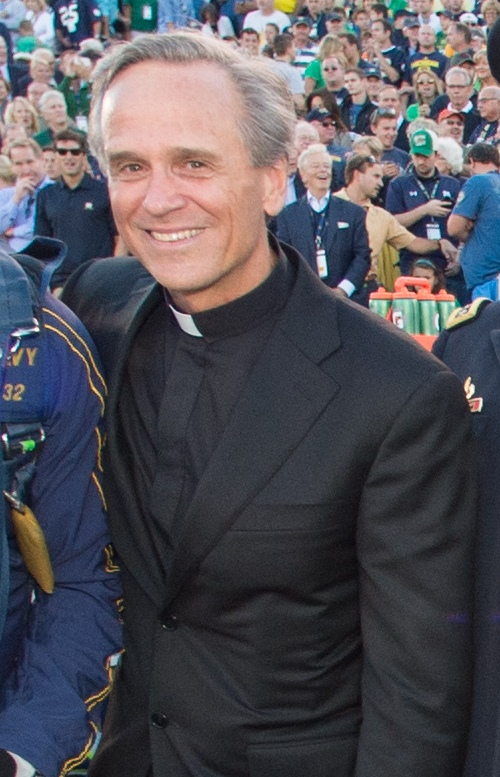
- Jenkins at Notre Dame Stadium in 2014

17th President of the University of Notre Dame
- In office July 1, 2005 – June 1, 2024
- Preceded by: Edward Malloy
- Succeeded by: Robert A. Dowd

Personal details
- Born: John Ignatius Jenkins; December 17, 1953 (age 72) Omaha, Nebraska, U.S.
- Education: University of Notre Dame (BA, MA); University of Oxford (BPhil, DPhil); Jesuit School of Theology (MDiv, STL)
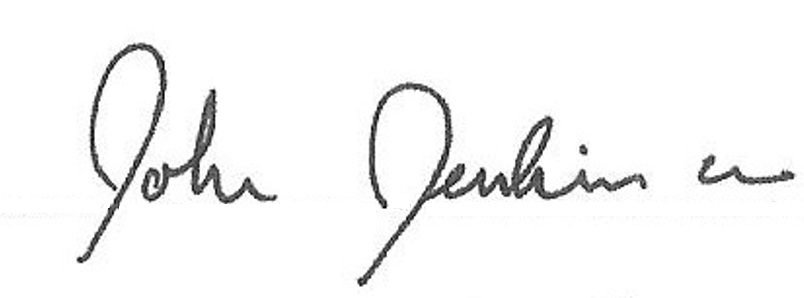
- Signature

The Reverend John I. Jenkins C.S.C.

Orders
- Ordination: 1983

Personal details
- Denomination: Catholic

John Ignatius Jenkins, C.S.C. (born December 17, 1953) is an American Catholic priest of the Congregation of Holy Cross who served as the 17th president of the University of Notre Dame from 2005 to 2024. He previously served as its vice-president and associate provost.

== Early life and career ==
Jenkins was born and raised in Omaha, Nebraska, and attended Creighton Preparatory School. In high school, he was captain of the swim team and prom king. Jenkins earned bachelor's and master's degrees in philosophy from the University of Notre Dame in 1976 and 1978, respectively, and was ordained a priest of the Congregation of Holy Cross in the Basilica of the Sacred Heart on campus in 1983. While earning master's and doctoral degrees in philosophy from Oxford University in 1987 and 1989, respectively, he also taught in Notre Dame's London Undergraduate Program. He earned a master of divinity degree and licentiate in sacred theology from the Jesuit School of Theology at Berkeley in 1988.

Jenkins has been a member of the Notre Dame philosophy faculty since 1990; he received a Lilly Teaching Fellowship in 1991–1992. He served as director of the Old College program for Holy Cross seminarians from 1991 to 1993 and as religious superior of the Holy Cross priests and brothers at Notre Dame from 1997 to 2000. He is the author of scholarly articles published in The Journal of Philosophy, Journal of Nietzsche Studies, Medieval Philosophy and Theology, and of the book Knowledge and Faith in Thomas Aquinas.

Jenkins is a member of the board of directors for the Commission on Presidential Debates.

== Notre Dame presidency ==
He was chosen as president by the Notre Dame board of trustees on April 29, 2004. His tenure began on July 1, 2005 and ended on June 1, 2024.

At Jenkins’ inauguration on September 23, 2005, Jenkins described his goals of making the university a leader in research that recognizes ethics and builds the connection between faith and studies. During his tenure, Notre Dame has increased its endowment, enlarged its student body, and undergone many construction projects on campus, including Compton Family Ice Arena, a new architecture hall, additional residence halls, the Jenkins-Nanovic Hall, and Campus Crossroads, a $400 million enhancement and expansion of Notre Dame Stadium.

Early in his tenure at Notre Dame, Jenkins was criticized for other decisions such as allowing performances of The Vagina Monologues and showings of gay films on campus.

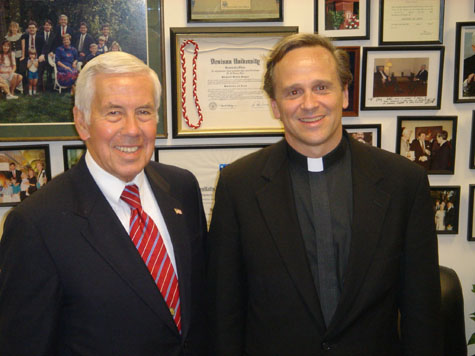
Jenkins with Senator Richard Lugar in 2005

Jenkins' decision to include an invitation to President Barack Obama to deliver the 2009 commencement address at Notre Dame and to receive an honorary degree was controversial. Inviting the sitting president of the United States to speak at commencement is, however, a custom at the University of Notre Dame. A number of Catholic bishops, including John Michael D'Arcy, the bishop of Fort Wayne–South Bend, as well as anti-abortion groups, criticized the invitation because of Obama's stance on abortion.

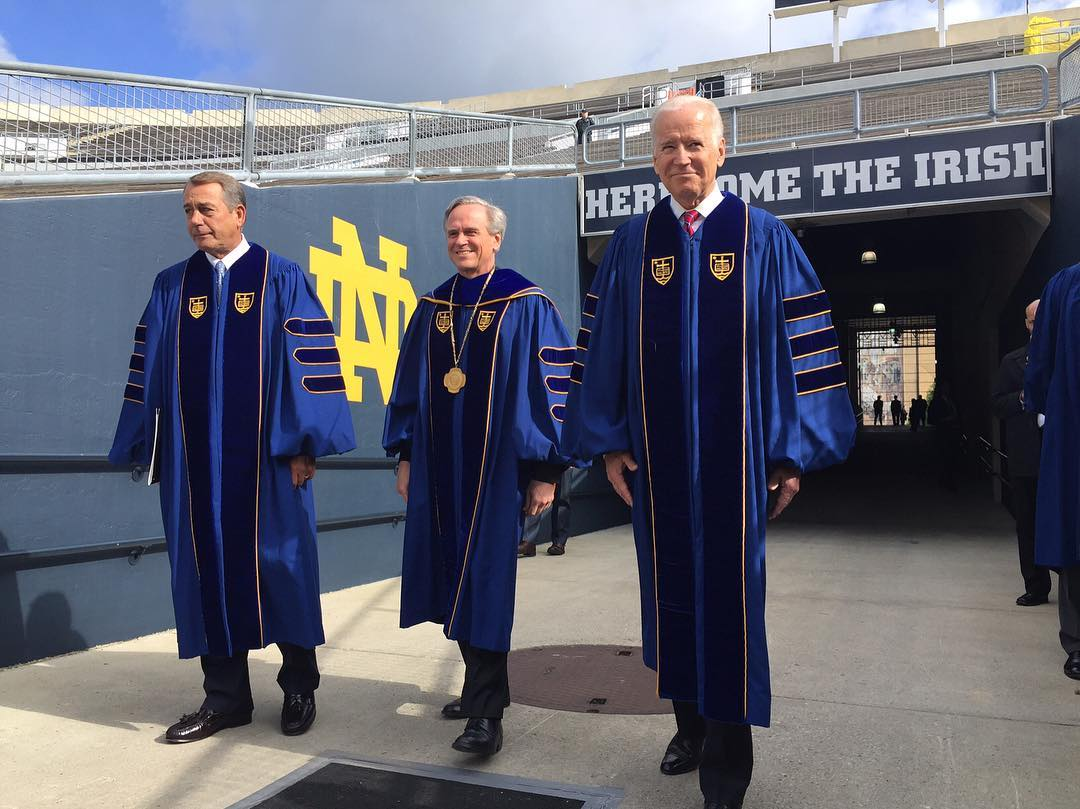
Jenkins (center) with former Speaker John Boehner and then-Vice President Joe Biden in 2016

In 2016, Kevin C. Rhoades, the bishop of Fort Wayne-South Bend, said that he disagreed with Notre Dame's decision to honor Vice President Joe Biden and John Boehner, the former speaker of the U.S. House of Representatives, with the university's Laetare Medal; Rhoades said he would have preferred the university to invite Biden and Boehner to speak "rather than bestow an honor that can provoke scandal."

On October 13, 2023, Jenkins announced his decision to step down from the presidency at the end of the 2023–24 academic year. On December 4, Robert A. Dowd was announced to succeed Jenkins as the 18th university president, beginning on June 1, 2024.

=== Salary ===
As a member of the Holy Cross order, Jenkins is bound by a vow of poverty. There is, however, still a presidential salary paid to Jenkins, according to an Internal Revenue Service Form 990, which is filled out by most non-profits such as private universities. In 2014, this salary was $830,119, making Jenkins officially the highest paid university president in the state of Indiana. However, most of this money goes to the Congregation of Holy Cross, and not Jenkins himself.

=== COVID-19 ===
On September 26, 2020, Jenkins attended the White House Supreme Court nomination ceremony for Notre Dame professor judge Amy Coney Barrett. Pictures showed him not wearing a mask and in close physical proximity, even hugging other attendees. On October 2, 2020, Jenkins tested positive for COVID-19, joining Trump, Melania Trump, U.S. senators Mike Lee and Thom Tillis, former New Jersey governor Chris Christie and Kellyanne Conway, all who attended the ceremony maskless. Days before the diagnosis, after photos were published, Jenkins publicly apologized for not wearing a mask nor adhering to social distancing guidelines.

On October 8, 2020, a faculty senate motion to consider a vote of no confidence was postponed by a 21 to 20 vote and after a raucous debate so that more feedback could be gathered. Jenkins was also criticized by the faculty for not following the strict health policy he imposed on campus while in Washington, for traveling while he has forbidden them and students to, and for opening Notre Dame's reputation to political exploitation.

A student-authored petition that called upon Jenkins to resign gathered 213 signatures—a number equal to approximately 2.5% of the size of Notre Dame's undergraduate student body. On October 1, 2020, one month after Jenkins tested positive for COVID-19, the majority of Notre Dame's undergraduate student senate voted in opposition to the petition, arguing that the motion was too extreme and that only a very small fraction of Notre Dame's undergraduate students had actually signed the petition calling for Jenkins' resignation.
