= James A. Burns =

American priest and President of the University of Notre Dame

The Reverend James A. Burns C.S.C.
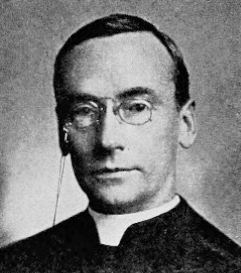

9th President of the University of Notre Dame
- In office 1919–1922
- Preceded by: John W. Cavanaugh
- Succeeded by: Matthew J. Walsh

Personal details
- Born: February 13, 1867 Michigan City, Indiana, U.S.
- Died: September 9, 1940 (aged 73) South Bend, Indiana, U.S.
- Resting place: Holy Cross Cemetery, Notre Dame, Indiana
- Education: University of Notre Dame

James Aloysius Burns, C.S.C. (February 13, 1867 — September 9, 1940) was an American Catholic priest who served as president of the University of Notre Dame from 1919 to 1922. He played a significant role in transforming Notre Dame into a national research university. He was professor of chemistry at Notre Dame from 1895 to 1900. He was a theorist of education, and wrote numerous books on the topic.

== Early life ==
James Aloysius Burns was born in Michigan City, Indiana February 13, 1867. After attending Notre Dame University, he entered the Congregation of Holy Cross in 1888. He was a teacher at Sacred Heart College in Watertown, Wisconsin, and was ordained in 1893. He became a professor at Notre Dame in 1890, and served as rector of Sorin Hall.

== President of the University of Notre Dame ==
Rev. Burns was Notre Dame's greatest theorist of education, and was pivotal in moving the university towards its academic and scholastic prominence. Immediately after Burns became president, he divided the university into four distinct colleges: Arts and Letters, Science, Engineering, and Law. In 1919 he eliminated the prep school to make more room on campus for college students. Focusing on academic matters, added no new buildings to the campus during his tenure, but in his final year set the foundations for a large expansion of the university. He began a campaign to raise $750,000, which, if raised secured $250,000 from the Rockefeller Foundation and $75,000 from the Carnegie foundation. He dramatically upgraded the Law School, and established the university's first endowment and a board of lay advisors to oversee it. In 1922 Burns decided not to serve another term and to devote his time to fund- raising activities. During this endeavor, he raised a decent amount of money, but more importantly was crucial in spreading the name and recognition of the university.

Burns was one of the founders of the Catholic College Conference, and founder and vice-president of the Catholic Education Association. He was a contributor, especially on educational themes, to many Catholic magazines; and to the Catholic Encyclopedia.

He died September 9, 1940.
