= John W. Cavanaugh =

American priest and academic administrator

The Reverend John W. Cavanaugh C.S.C.
- John W. Cavanaugh

8th President of the University of Notre Dame
- In office 1905–1919
- Preceded by: Andrew Morrissey
- Succeeded by: James A. Burns

Personal details
- Born: May 21, 1870 Leetonia, Ohio, U.S.
- Died: May 22, 1935 (aged 65) Notre Dame, Indiana, U.S.
- Resting place: Holy Cross Cemetery, Notre Dame, Indiana
- Education: University of Notre Dame

John W. Cavanaugh, C.S.C. (May 21, 1870 – May 22, 1935) was an American Catholic priest who served as president of the University of Notre Dame from 1905 to 1919.

He came to Notre Dame at the age of 16, in 1886. On August 15, 1889, John Cavanaugh received the habit and worked during his Novitiate for Notre Dame English professor Maurice Francis Egan. He received his Litt. B. in 1890. On August 15, 1891, Cavanaugh made his final vows. From 1892 to 1905 he helped Fr. Hudson with The Ave Maria. On April 20, 1894, Cavanaugh was ordained a priest by bishop Joseph Rademacher of Fort Wayne. He was superior of Holy Cross Seminary from 1898 to 1905.

== President of the University of Notre Dame ==
Cavanaugh was an intellectual figure, known for his literary gifts and his eloquent speeches. During his presidency, he dedicated himself to improve Notre Dame's academic and scholastic reputation, and the number of students awarded bachelor's and master's degrees significantly increased during his tenure. As part of his ongoing commitment to improve the university's academic standing, Cavanaugh attracted a number of eminent scholars to the university, established a chair in journalism, and introduced courses in Chemical Engineering. During his time as president, Notre Dame also rapidly became a significant force on the football field. Yet Cavanaugh resented the implications that Notre Dame should be known as a football school, and almost ended the football program because it was a money-losing endeavor until 1913. Ironically, two of Notre Dame's most famous football personalities appeared during his tenure, George Gipp and Knute Rockne. Cavanaugh Hall at the University of Notre Dame was dedicated in 1936 in his honor.

== External sources ==
- "John W. Cavanaugh: Notes on Notre Dame". archives.nd.edu.
- "Notre Dame -- 100 Years: Chapter XX". archives.nd.edu.
