= Edward Malloy =

American Catholic priest and 16th president of Notre Dame

The Reverend Edward Malloy C.S.C.

16th President of the University of Notre Dame
- In office June 1, 1987 – July 1, 2005
- Preceded by: Theodore Hesburgh
- Succeeded by: John I. Jenkins

Personal details
- Born: Edward Aloysius Malloy; May 3, 1941 (age 85) Washington, D.C., U.S.
- Education: University of Notre Dame (BA, MA, MA); Vanderbilt University (PhD)

The Reverend Edward Malloy C.S.C.

Orders
- Ordination: April 4, 1970

Personal details
- Denomination: Catholic

Edward Aloysius Malloy, C.S.C. (born May 3, 1941) is an American Catholic priest, academic and former college basketball player who is a member of the Congregation of Holy Cross. Commonly referred to as “Monk Malloy”, he is best known for his service as the 16th president of the University of Notre Dame from 1987 to 2005.

== Biography ==
Malloy was born on May 3, 1941, in Washington, D.C. He attended Archbishop Carroll High School, where he was part of a basketball team that included John Thompson and Tom Hoover. During his senior season, the team started a 55-game winning streak.

He received a BA and MA in English from the University of Notre Dame in 1963 and 1967; and an M.A. in Theology in 1969. As an undergraduate at Notre Dame, he was on the basketball team, but he never started. He was ordained as priest in 1970, and he received a PhD in Christian ethics from Vanderbilt University in 1975.

== Presidency of the University of Notre Dame ==
In 1974, Father Malloy started teaching at Notre Dame. In 1986, he was elected by the trustees as vice-president and Associate Provost. Assuming office on June 1, 1987, he served as president until 2005.

Malloy sits on the Board of Trustees of Vanderbilt University and the University of Portland, the University of St. Thomas, and the University of Notre Dame Australia. He has served in leadership roles as chair of the American Council on Education (ACE), the Association of Governing Boards of Universities and Colleges (AGB), and Campus Compact, and has been an active participant on the Business-Higher Education Forum, the general council of the International Federation of Catholic Universities (IFCU), the board of the Association of Catholic Colleges and Universities (ACCU), the board of directors of the National Association of Independent Colleges and Universities (NAICU), the National Committee on Higher Education and the Health of Youth, the board of advisors of The Bernardin Center for Theology and Ministry at Catholic Theological Union of Chicago, the board of directors of the NCAA Foundation, and the editorial advisory board of The Presidency, the magazine of the American Council on Education.

Malloy has been a member of the advisory board of the AmeriCorps and National Civilian Community Corps (NCCC), a founding director of the Points of Light Foundation, member of the board of governors of the Boys and Girls Clubs of America, and a member of the State of Indiana Community Service and Volunteer Committee and the Indiana Commission on Community Service (Indiana AmeriCorps). He is a recipient of the National Association of Basketball Coaches Balfour Silver Anniversary Award.

Malloy has been a member of the National Advisory Council on Alcohol Abuse and Alcoholism, President George H. W. Bush's Advisory Council on Drugs, the Community Anti-Drug Coalitions of America, and the Governor's Commission for a Drug-Free Indiana. He currently serves on the board of directors of the National Center on Addiction and Substance Abuse (CASA) at Columbia University, for which he has chaired commissions on Substance Abuse Among America's Adolescents and on Substance Abuse at Colleges and Universities. He currently is co-chair of the subcommittee on college drinking of the National Institute on Alcohol Abuse and Alcoholism, a component of the National Institutes of Health, and for CASA, he now chairs the National Commission on Substance Abuse and Sports. He recently served as chair of the Sports Wagering Task Force established by the NCAA.

Malloy has served the Catholic Church on the Vatican Secretariat for Non-Believers, the Ex Corde Ecclesiae and Bishops-Presidents committees of the U.S. Catholic Conference, the World Congress of Catholic Educators, and the Sister Thea Bowman Black Catholic Educational Foundation. He serves on the board of the National Leadership Roundtable on Church Management. He is a member of the Catholic Theological Society of America and the Society of Christian Ethics.

== Career statistics ==
Legend
| GP | Games played | GS | Games started | MPG | Minutes per game |
| FG% | Field goal percentage | 3P% | 3-point field goal percentage | FT% | Free throw percentage |
| RPG | Rebounds per game | APG | Assists per game | SPG | Steals per game |
| BPG | Blocks per game | PPG | Points per game | **Bold** | Career high |

=== College ===
| Year | Team | GP | GS | MPG | FG% | 3P% | FT% | RPG | APG | SPG | BPG | PPG |
|---|---|---|---|---|---|---|---|---|---|---|---|---|
| 1960–61 | Notre Dame | 3 | 0 | – | .250 | – | – | .7 | – | – | – | .7 |
| 1961–62 | Notre Dame | **11** | 0 | – | **.500** | – | **.200** | **.8** | – | – | – | **1.7** |
| 1962–63 | Notre Dame | 7 | 0 | – | .188 | – | .000 | .6 | – | – | – | .9 |
| Career | | 21 | 0 | – | .342 | – | .167 | .7 | – | – | – | 1.3 |

== Bibliography ==
- Bringle, Robert G.; Richard Games; Edward A. Malloy (1999). Colleges and Universities as Citizens. Allyn & Bacon. p. 210. ISBN 0-205-28696-8.
- Malloy, Edward A. (1999). Monk's Reflections: A View from the Dome. Andrews McMeel Publishing. p. 232. ISBN 0-7407-0116-9.
- Malloy, Edward A. (2004). Monk's Travels: People, Places and Events. Andrews McMeel Publishing. pp. 204. ISBN 0-7407-4706-1.
- Biography Monk's Tale in three volumes:
  - Malloy, Edward A. (2009). Monk's Tale: The Pilgrimage Begins 1941-1975. Vol. 1. University of Notre Dame Press. p. 256. ISBN 978-0-268-03516-7.
  - Malloy, Edward A. (2011). Monk's Tale: Way Stations on the Journey. Vol. 2. University of Notre Dame Press. p. 280. ISBN 978-0-268-03522-8.
  - Malloy, Edward A. (2016). Monk's Tale: The Presidential Years 1987-2005. Monk's Tale Volume 3. University of Notre Dame Press. p. 456. ISBN 978-0-268-10044-5.
