= Hugh O'Donnell (priest) =

American priest

The Reverend Hugh O'Donnell C.S.C.

13th President of the University of Notre Dame
- In office 1940–1946
- Preceded by: John Francis O'Hara
- Succeeded by: John J. Cavanaugh

11th President of St. Edward's University
- In office 1931–1934
- Preceded by: Joseph Burke
- Succeeded by: Joseph Maguire

Personal details
- Born: John Hugh O'Donnell; June 2, 1884 Grand Rapids, Michigan, U.S.
- Died: June 12, 1947 (aged 63) Notre Dame, Indiana, U.S.
- Resting place: Holy Cross Cemetery, Notre Dame, Indiana
- Education: The Catholic University of America, University of Notre Dame

John Hugh O'Donnell, C.S.C. (June 2, 1884 – June 12, 1947), was an American Catholic priest who served as president of the University of Notre Dame from 1940 to 1946, after having served as vice president from 1934 to 1940 and as president of St. Edward's University from 1931 to 1934.

== President of the University of Notre Dame ==
During World War II, O'Donnell offered Notre Dame's facilities to the armed forces. The navy accepted his offer and installed Naval ROTC units on campus as part of the V-12 Navy College Training Program. Soon after the installation there were only a few hundred civilian students at Notre Dame. O'Donnell also continued O'Hara's work with the graduate school. He further formalized the graduate program and replaced the previous committee of graduate studies with a dean.
