= John Augustine Zahm =

American priest (1851–1921)

The Very Reverend John Augustine Zahm C.S.C.
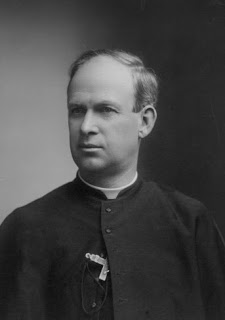
- Father Zahm, CSC
- Born: June 14, 1851; New Lexington, Ohio, U.S.
- Died: November 10, 1921 (aged 70); Munich, Germany
- Other name: H. J. Mozans
- Education: University of Notre Dame

Ecclesiastical career
- Church: Roman Catholicism
- Ordained: 1875
- Offices held: Provincial of the Indiana Province of the Congregation of Holy Cross

John Augustine Zahm (pseudonym H. J. Mozans), CSC (June 14, 1851 – November 10, 1921) was a Holy Cross priest, author, scientist, and explorer of South America. He was born at New Lexington, Ohio, and died in Munich, Germany.

== Early life ==
Zahm was born on June 14, 1851, in a log home in Jackson Township, Perry County, Ohio to John and Mary (née Braddock) Zahm. His mother was born in Pennsylvania and was of English descent, having Edward Braddock as an ancestor. His father was an immigrant to the United States from Olsberg, Germany.

Zahm initially attended a one-room schoolhouse in Logan, with Januarius MacGahan being one of his classmates, before the family moved to Huntington, Indiana from where he learned of the University of Notre Dame.

== Education and career ==
Zahm attended the University of Notre Dame in 1867 and graduated with honors in 1871 as a Novice of the Congregation of Holy Cross. He finished his theological studies and was ordained in 1875. Zahm was hired by the University of Notre Dame as a science teacher although he had interest in literature. His brother Albert attended Notre Dame as a student while John was on the faculty.

During his time teaching he wrote the text Sound and Music in 1892. He was appointed the Vice President of Notre Dame at 25 years of age and held the position for nine years. In 1895, he was recognized as Doctor of Philosophy by Pope Leo XIII. Zahm championed the view of Notre Dame becoming a research university dedicated to scholarship, which was at odds with Andrew Morrissey, who hoped to keep the institution a smaller boarding school.

== Writing ==
Zahm is the author of many scholarly texts and published works against Darwinism. He also wrote Catholic scientific essays published in American Catholic Quarterly and Catholic World, among others.

Zahm fought through writing and used his detailed background in science to defend the ability of God and the Catholic faith to remain in the scientific sphere. Focusing on Catholic men of science in the past, Zahm founded a magazine, Catholic Science and Catholic Scientists. Between 1891 and 1896, he published multiple books and articles on the topic, culminating with Evolution and Dogma in 1896.

In this text, as in his others, Zahm argued that Roman Catholicism could fully accept an evolutionary view of biological systems, as long as this view was not centered around Darwin's theory of natural selection. After the Vatican decided to censure the book in 1898, Zahm fully accepted this rebuttal and pulled away from any writing concerning the relationship of theology and science.

Zahm's pseudonym was derived from the way he signed his name as a youth: Jno. S. (Stanislaus, an abandoned middle name) Zahm. His works have been translated into French, Italian, Spanish, and have been published and read North and South America, as well as in Europe. These include: Woman in Science and Great Inspirers. The Quest for El Dorado, and the general title of his trilogy was "Following the Conquistadores", and the titles of books called Up the Orinoco and Down the Magdalena (1910), Along the Andes and Down the Amazon (1912) and In South America's Southland (1916), all drew from his travels throughout South America. He was an enthusiastic Dante student and assembled at Notre Dame one of the three largest Dante libraries in the U.S.

Zahm befriended 26th President of the United States Theodore Roosevelt, who also loved and read Dante in Italian. It was Zahm who talked President Roosevelt into participating in what came to be known as the Roosevelt-Rondon Scientific Expedition to South America, and which would also include Theodore's son, Kermit, and Colonel Cândido Mariano da Silva Rondon, to go up the Rio da Dúvida (River of Doubt, now the Roosevelt River).

== Death and legacy ==
Zahm planned a book on historical and archaeological study of the Holy Land, but died of bronchial pneumonia in a Munich hospital en route to the Middle East. The manuscripts of his working book From Berlin to Baghdad and Babylon were found and published posthumously.

== Works authored ==
Zahm used a number of pseudonyms, mainly H. J. Mozans, but also A. H. Johns, Manso, and A. H. Solis.

=== Books ===
- J. A. Zahm (1896), Evolution and dogma, Chicago: D. H. McBride, OL 7119332M
- J. A. Zahm (1896), Scientific theory and Catholic doctrine, Chicago: D. H. McBride & Co., OL 7187109M (Full Text)
- J. A. Zahm as "H.J. Mozans" (1910), Following the Conquistadores up the Orinoco and down the Magdalena, New York: D. Appleton and company, OCLC 1709644, OL 7019372M (Full Text)
- J. A. Zahm as "H.J. Mozans" (1911), Along the Andes and down the Amazon, New York: D. Appleton, OL 13489734M (Full Text). Introduction by Theodore Roosevelt.
- J. A. Zahm (1917), The quest of El Dorado, New York: D. Appleton and Co., OCLC 2589236, OL 7200168M (Full Text)
- J. A. Zahm as "H.J. Mozans" (1913), Woman in science, New York: D. Appleton and Co., OL 23361002M (Full Text)

=== Articles (selection) ===
- J. A. Zahm as "A. H. Johns". "Woman's Work in Bible Study and Translation", in The Catholic World, New York, Vol. 95/June 1912

== See also ==
- Zahm Hall, a men's residence hall at Notre Dame named after Zahm
- List of Roman Catholic scientist-clerics

== Sources ==
- The River of Doubt by Candice Millard (Doubleday 2005)
