= Mary Galvin =

Mary Galvin may refer to:

- Mary Galvin (American academic)
- Mary Galvin (Irish academic)
