= Notre Dame College of Science =

College of the University of Notre Dame

Coordinates: 41°42′03.1″N 86°13′54.7″W

College of Science
- College of Science at the University of Notre Dame du Lac
- Type: Private
- Established: 1865; 161 years ago
- Parent institution: University of Notre Dame
- Dean: Steven A. Corcelli
- Academic staff: 550
- Undergraduates: 1,680
- Postgraduates: 450
- Location: Notre Dame, Indiana, Indiana, United States
- Website: http://science.nd.edu/

The College of Science is a college within the University of Notre Dame. The Dean of the College of Science is Steven A. Corcelli, appointed April 1, 2026.

== History ==
The College of Science was established in 1865 by Rev. John Zahm, C.S.C., and in 1884 the first Science Hall was built (now LaFortune Student Center).

In April 1899 Professor Jerome Green and his assistants set out to replicate the wireless experiments conducted by Guglielmo Marconi. First they sent messages between different rooms of Science Hall (now LaFortune Hall), then tried between Science Hall and Sorin Hall. Finally, they successfully transmitted messages from the spire of the Sacred Heart Church to Saint Mary's College, several miles away. He then went on to replicate these experiments the following month in Chicago. Although these experiments were merely duplication of those of Marconi, they were the first radio transmissions in America.

Rev. Julius Nieuwland, C.S.C., a Notre Dame chemist and botanist, established The American Midland Naturalist in 1909, a Midwestern plant life quarterly that today is an international journal of ecology, evolution, and the environment. His research led to the development of Neoprene, the first synthetic rubber, at DuPont industries in 1930. Because of his contribution, in 1952 DuPont paid in part the construction of Nieuwland Science Hall, that to this day hosts research in physics and chemistry.

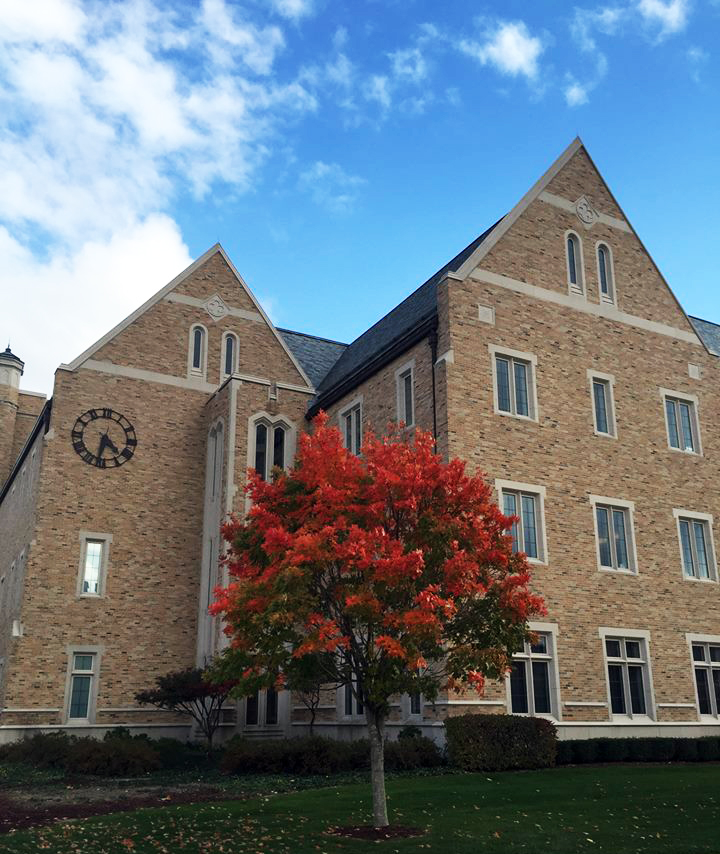
Jordan Hall, built in 2007, houses the administrative offices of the College of Science, including the Dean's Office.

The Laboratories of Bacteriology at the University of Notre Dame (LOBUND) was established in 1935 after the germ-free research of Prof. James Reyniers. The LOBUND attracts top scientists and became the world's leader institution in germ-free research.

The first whole-ecosystem experiment was performed in 1951 on about 7,500 acres on the Wisconsin-Michigan border at the University of Notre Dame Environmental Research Center (UNDERC), land owned by the university consisting of several lakes and used for environmental research.

Prof. George B. Craig Jr. becomes the director of the Vector Biology Laboratory in 1957 and, for the next two decades, performs important research into the genetics of Aedes aegypti. The New York Times called Craig "one of the world's foremost experts on mosquitoes". and the National Academies Press called him "an internationally recognized expert on the biology and control of mosquitoes" and that his "contributions made ... to medical entomology are almost incalculable". The Jordan Hall of Science opens in 2006, after an investment of more than $70 million donated by Chicago business man Jay Jordan. The Hall includes a Digital Visualization Theater, 40 teaching labs, two lecture halls, an observatory, a greenhouse, and a space exhibiting the extensive plant collection of Rev. Nieuwland. In 2005 Notre Dame joined a consortium that sponsored the Large Binocular Telescope. In 1989 Dr. Malcolm Fraser discovered and developed the PiggyBac transposon system.

== Departments, Majors, and Minors ==
- Department of Applied and Computational Mathematics and Statistics

- Applied and Computational Mathematics and Statistics (ACMS) (major)
- Statistics (major)

- Department of Biological Sciences

- Biological Sciences (major)
- Environmental Sciences (major)

- Department of Chemistry and Biochemistry

- Chemistry (major)
- Biochemistry (major)

- Department of Mathematics

- Mathematics (major)
- Actuarial Science (minor)

- Department of Physics and Astronomy

- Physics (major)

- Collegiate Sequence

- Science-Computing (major)
- Science-Education (major)

- Neuroscience and Behavior (major)
- Preprofessional Studies (major)
- Energy Studies (minor)
- Sustainability (minor)
- Compassionate Care in Medicine (minor)
- Science and Patient Advocacy (minor)

== Facilities ==
The College of Science has facilities in Jordan Hall, Galvin Hall, Stepan Chemistry Hall, Nieuwland Hall, McCourtney, and other locations on campus. UNDERC is a center for environmental studies located on the Wisconsin-Michigan border.

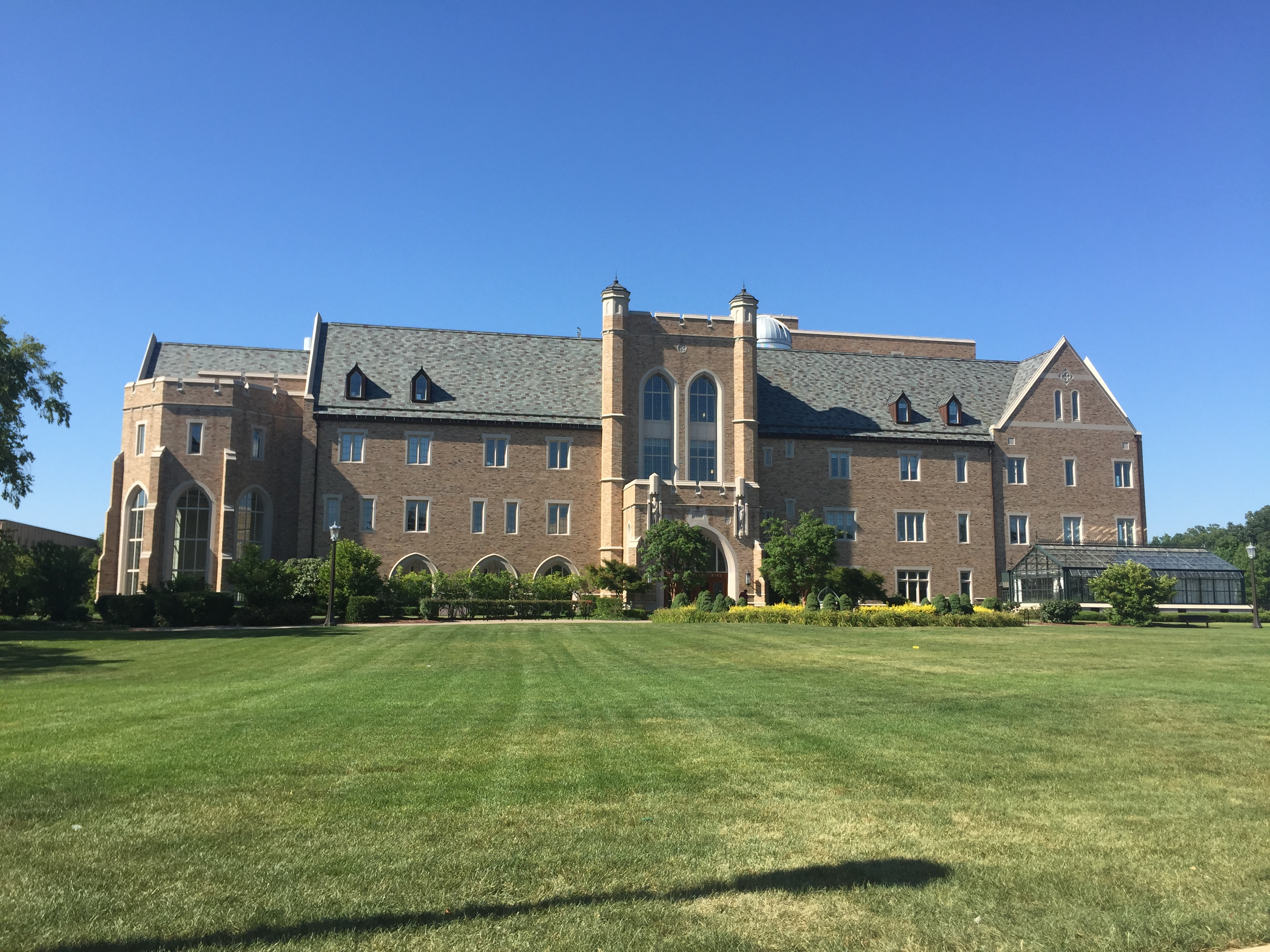
Jordan Hall, home of the College of Science. It houses 40 laboratories, an observatory, two lecture halls, several classrooms, a small café, quiet study areas on each floor, and a greenhouse.

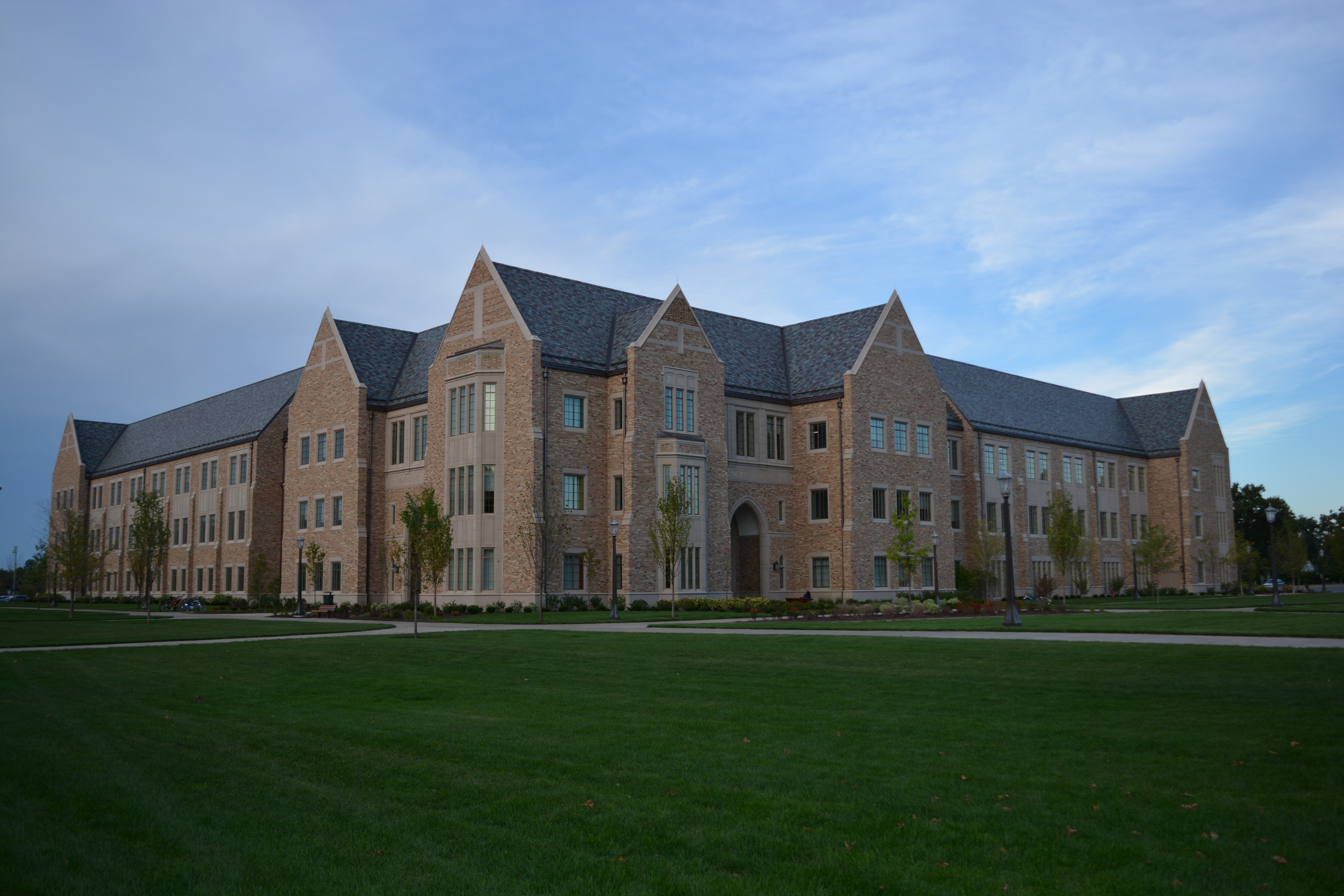
McCourtney Hall, which was built in 2016 and is a research center for Biochemistry and Bioengineering.

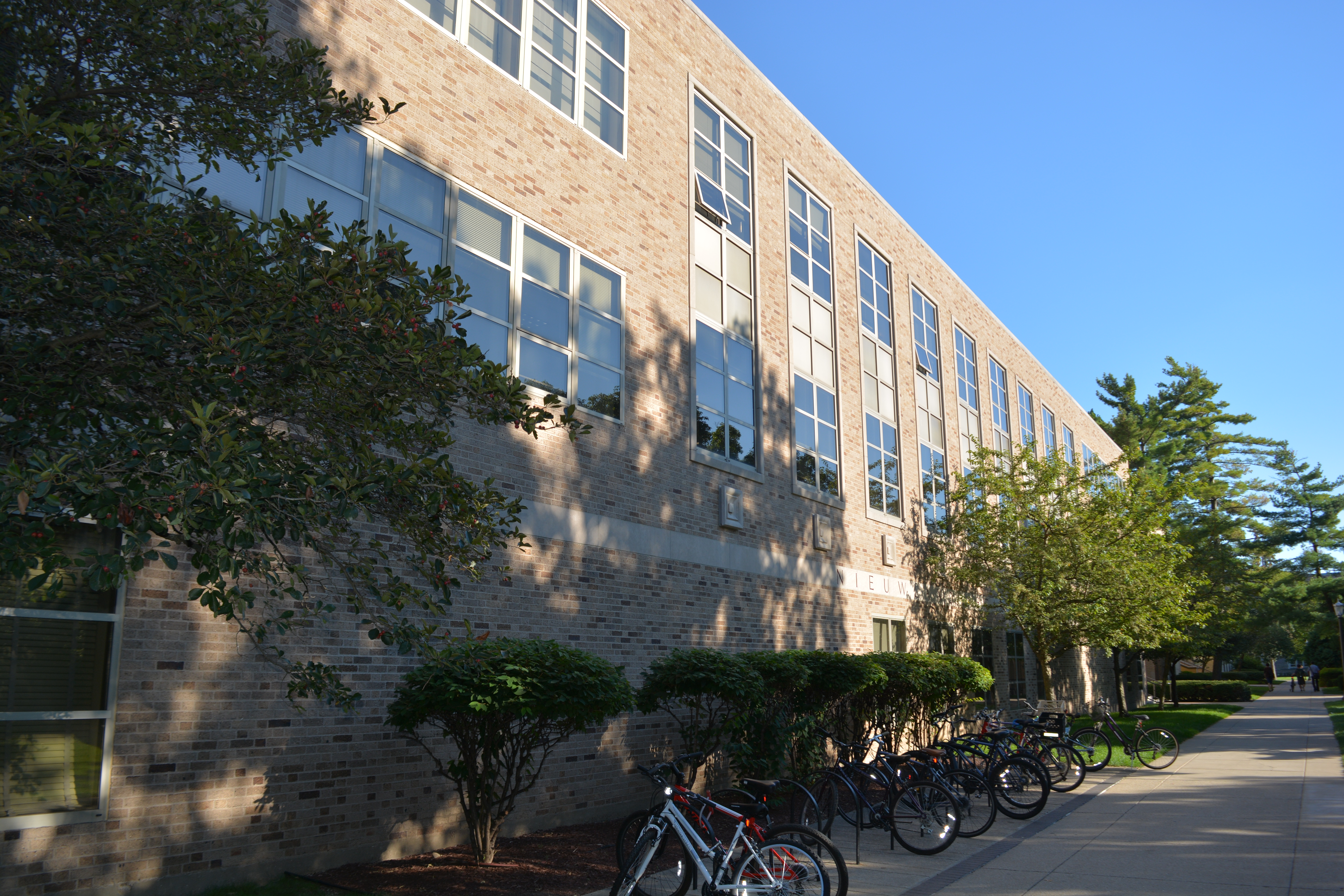
Nieuwland Hall, home to the Department of Physics and the Department of Chemistry and Biochemistry. Nieuwland is also home to a brand new low-energy nuclear accelerator.

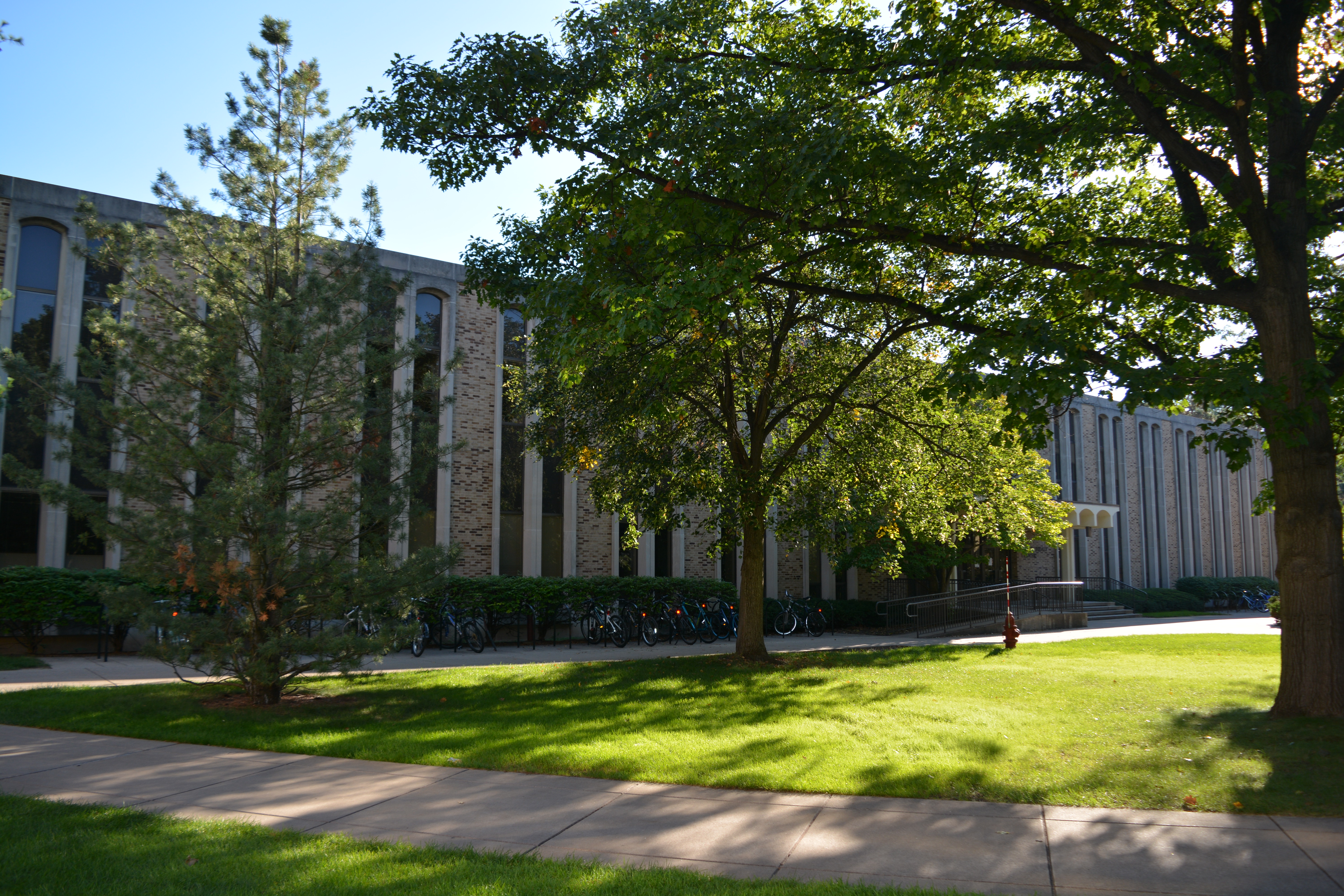
Hayes-Healy Hall, the home of the department of Mathematics and the O’Meara Mathematics Library.

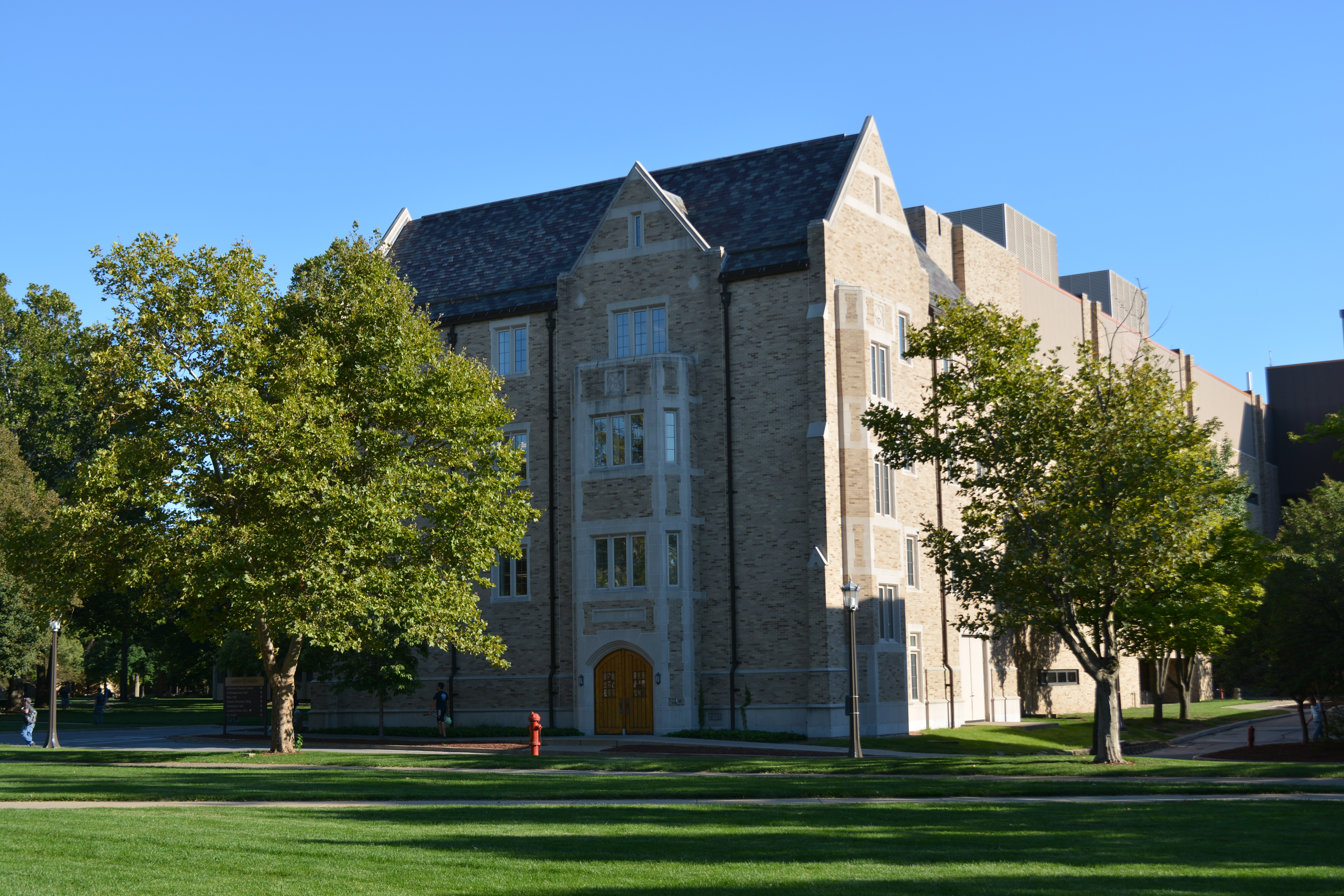
Stepan Chemistry Hall, which houses chemistry faculty offices and laboratories.

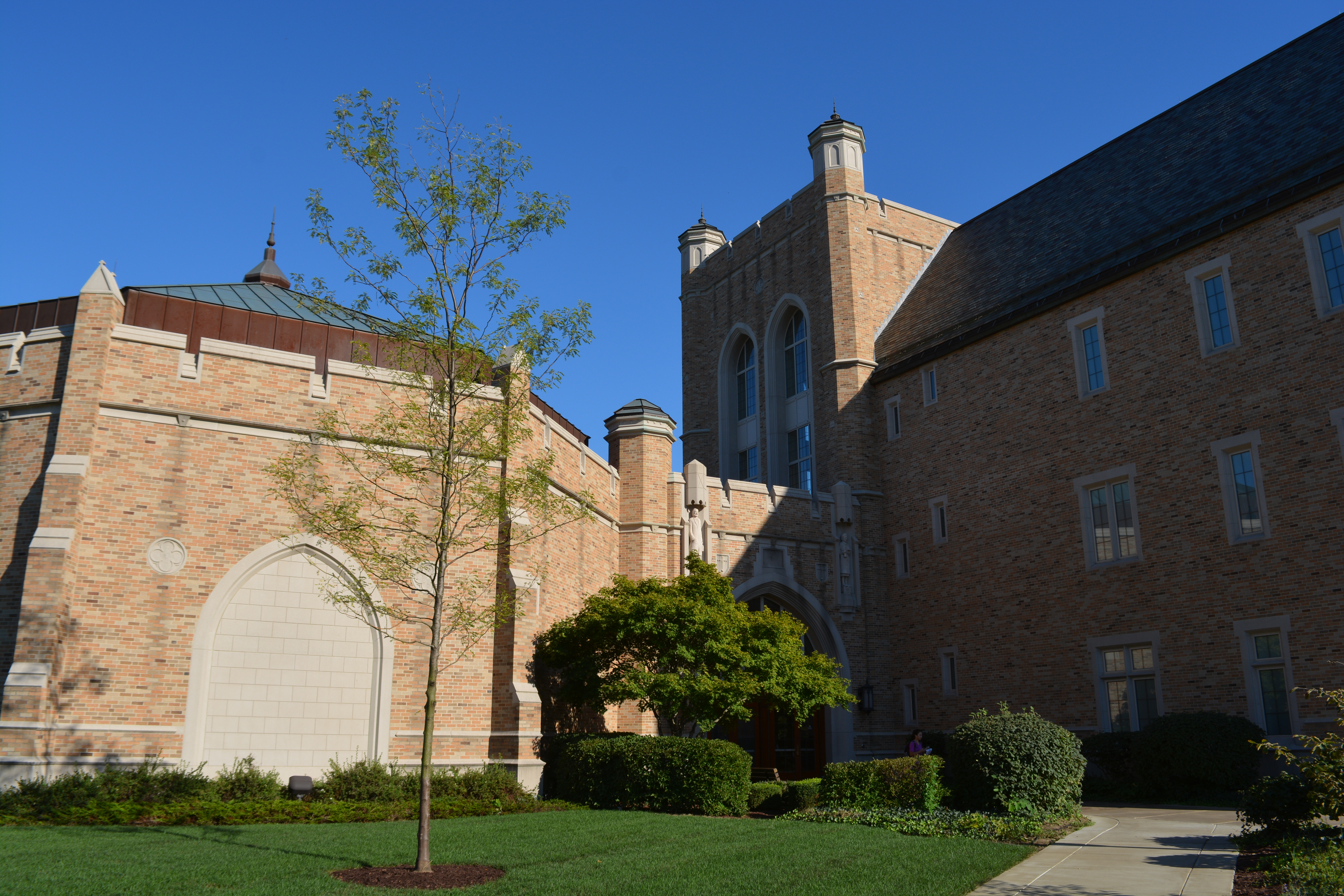
The Jordan Hall Digital Visualization Theatre.

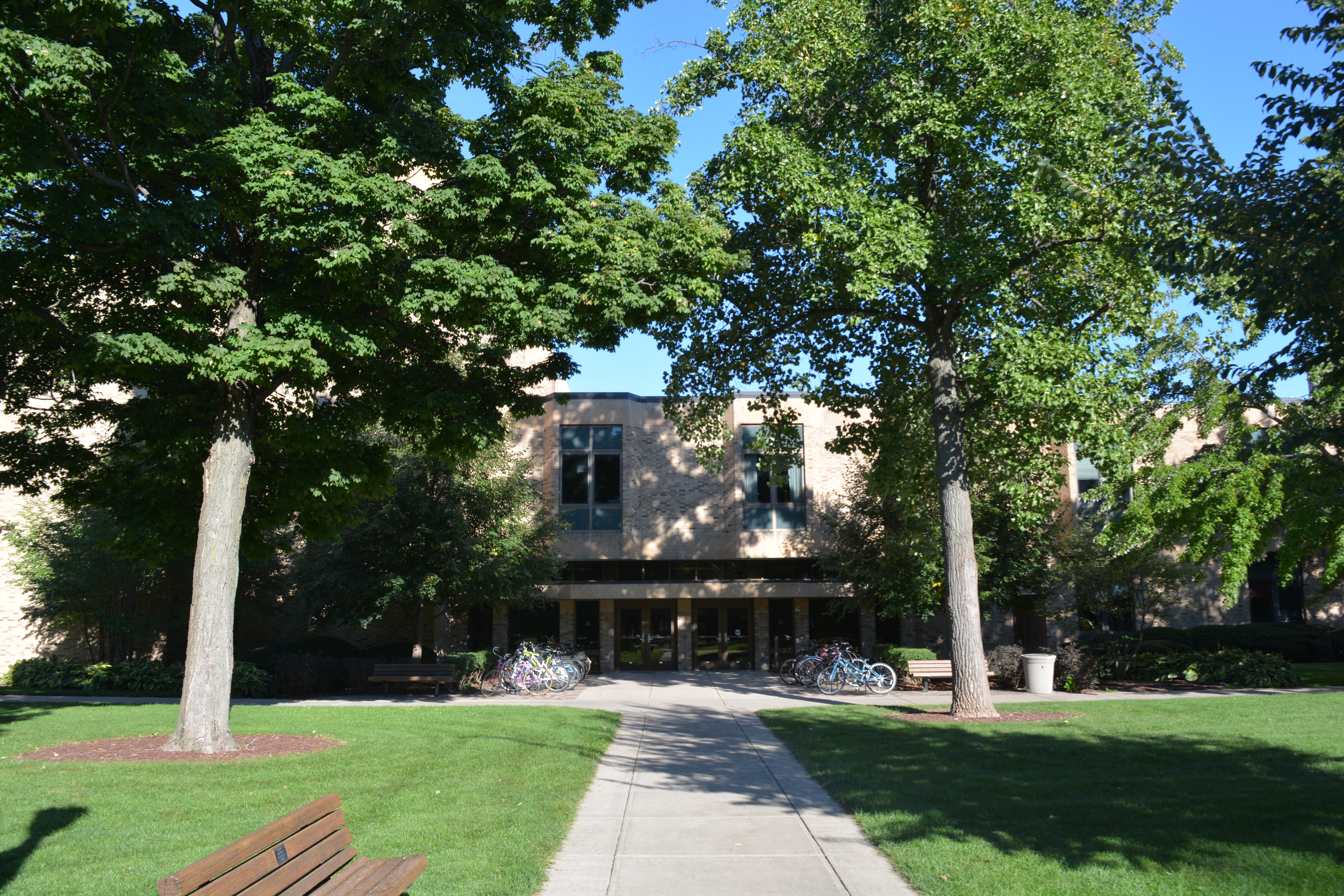
Galvin Hall, the home of the Biological Sciences department, classrooms, offices and research labs.

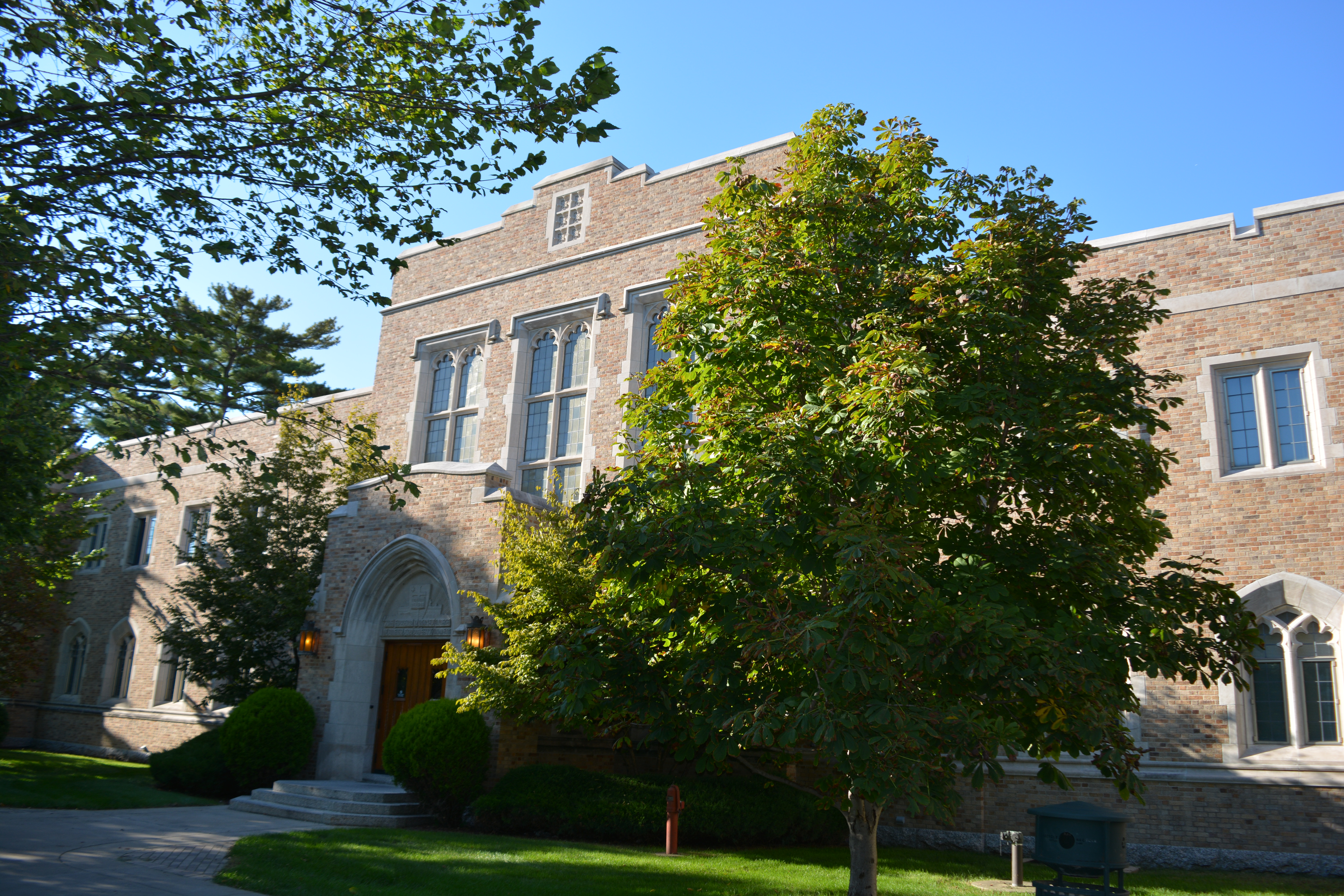
Hurley Hall, the former home of the Department of Applied and Computational Mathematics and Statistics.

== List of deans ==
- Rev. Julius Nieuwland (1919–1923)
- Rev. Francis J. Wenninger (1923–1940)
- Henry B. Froning (1940–1943)
- Lawrence H. Baldinger (1943–1960)
- Frederick D. Rossini (1960–1967)
- Bernard Waldman (1967–1979)
- Francis J. Castellino (1979–2002)
- Joseph P. Marino (2002–2008)
- Gregory Crawford (2008–2015)
- Mary Galvin (2015–2021)
- Santiago Schnell (2021–2025)
- Steven Corcelli (2026-)

== Notable faculty ==
- John Zahm
- Julius Nieuwland
- George B. Craig
- Paul Erdős
- Don Lincoln
- Emil Artin
- Albert-László Barabási
- Eugene Guth
- Ernest L. Eliel
- Karl Menger
- Kurt Gödel
- Nora J. Besansky

== Notable alumni ==
- Eric Wieschaus Nobel Prize for Medicine in 1995
- Tom Dooley
- Charles W. Misner
- Carol Shields
- Francis Versnyder, William D. Manly, and Bob Galvin, recipients of the National Medal of Technology and Innovation
