= Kinwamakwad (Long) Lake =

Lake in Michigan, United States

Kinwamakwad Lake
- Long Lake; West Long Lake; East Long Lake
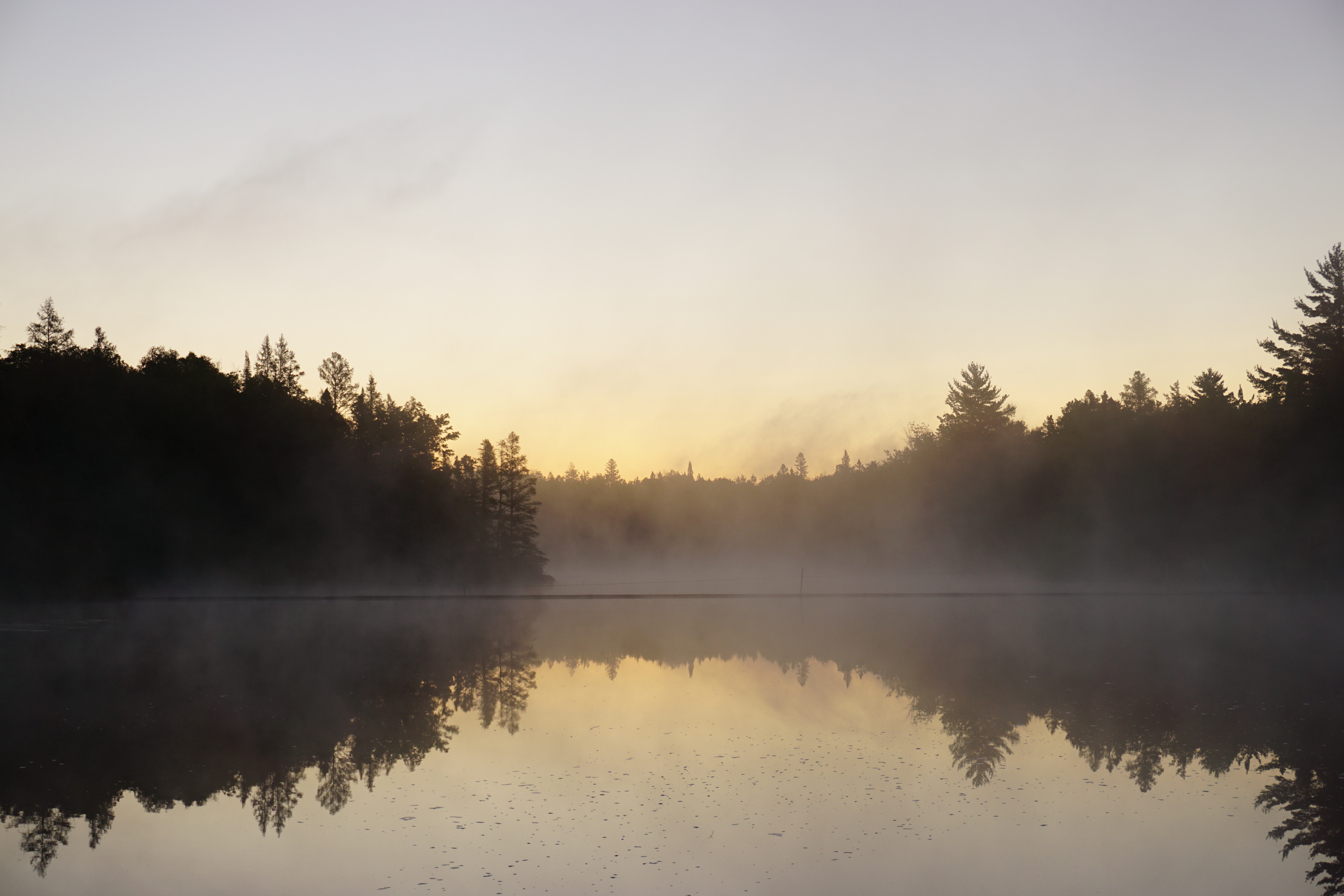
- Kinwamakwad Lake (Long Lake) in the early morning.

- Location within Michigan
- Location: Marenisco Township, Michigan, United States
- Coordinates: 46°14′9.16″N 89°29′56.07″W
- Type: mesotropic
- Catchment area: 16.4 ha (41 acres)
- Surface area: 8.1 ha (20 acres)
- Average depth: 3.8 m (12 ft)
- Max. depth: 14 m (46 ft)
- Water volume: 318,084 m^{3} (11,233,000 cu ft)
- Residence time: 2 years
- Shore length^{1}: 800 m (2,600 ft)
- Surface elevation: 514 m (1,686 ft)
- Frozen: Ice covered typically from November to April
- ^{1} Shore length is not a well-defined measure.

Kinwamakwad Lake, also known as Long Lake, is a seepage at the University of Notre Dame Environmental Research Center in Gogebic County, Michigan. The lake has been studied since the mid-1900s and used as an experimental lake for ecological studies.

== Description ==
Kinwamakwad Lake is an hourglass-shaped lake with two deep basins to the East and West and a shallower portion in the middle of the lake. The name "Kinwamakwad" possibly comes from the Ojibwe word ginwaakwad, meaning "it is long, is tall".

== Ecological studies ==
Kinwamakwad Lake has been studied for several decades and is a part of the Global Lake Ecological Observatory Network. The lake has been used in several whole-lake experiments examining the effects of nutrients and food web structure on lake productivity as well as the effects of dissolved organic carbon on lake productivity.

== Records ==
A pair of the unofficial world's largest secchi disks reside in Kinwamakwad Lake, with both disks measuring 2.44 meters in diameter.

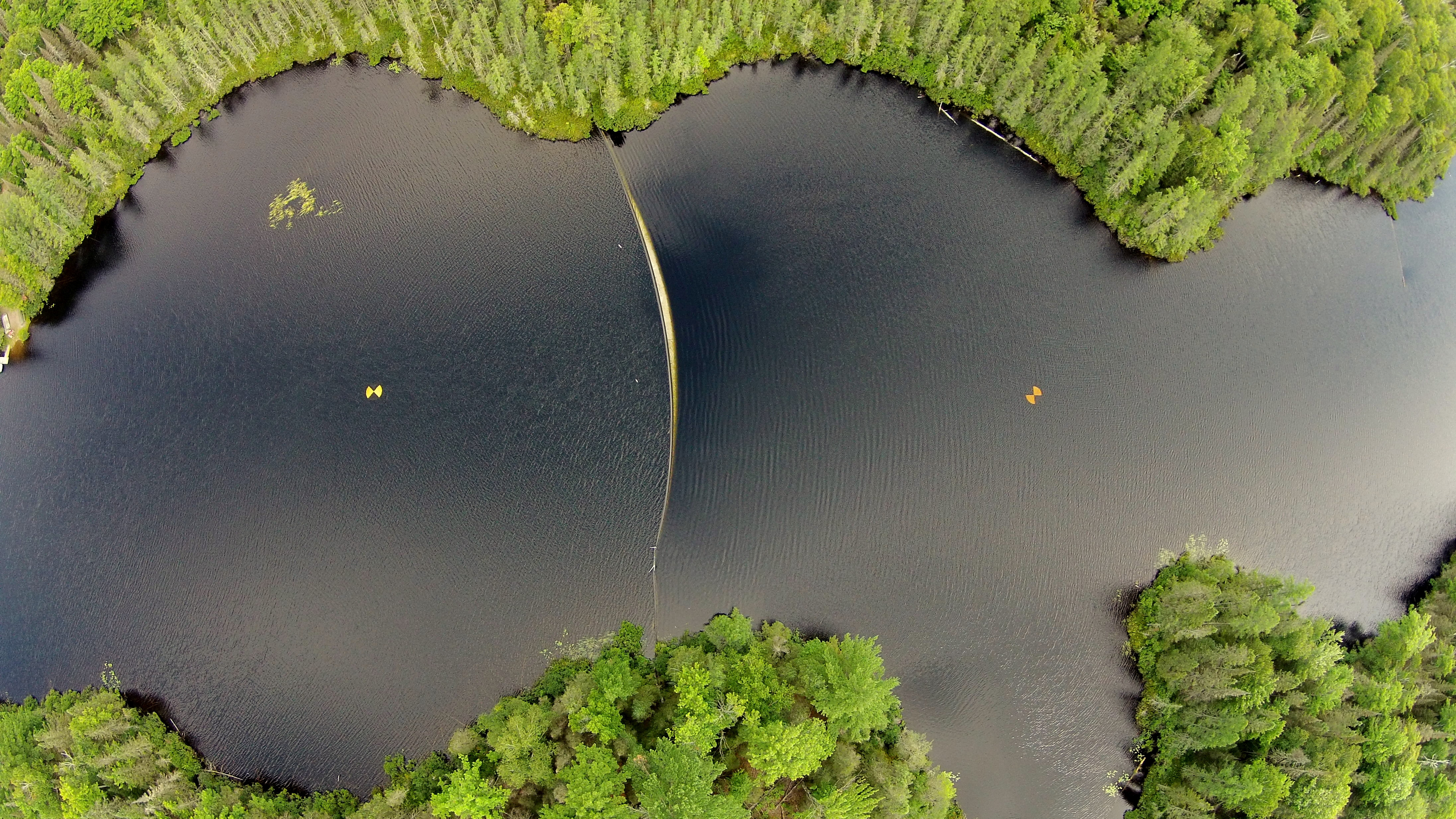
Aerial photo of Kinwamakwad Lake (Long Lake) in 2015 during a whole-lake manipulation in which dissolved organic carbon was increased by ~50% in the treatment basin (right of the white curtain in center of the photo). The difference in water color between the two basins can be seen with a pair of unofficial world's largest secchi disks.
