= Trout Bog Lake (Vilas County, Wisconsin) =

Lake in the state of Wisconsin, United States

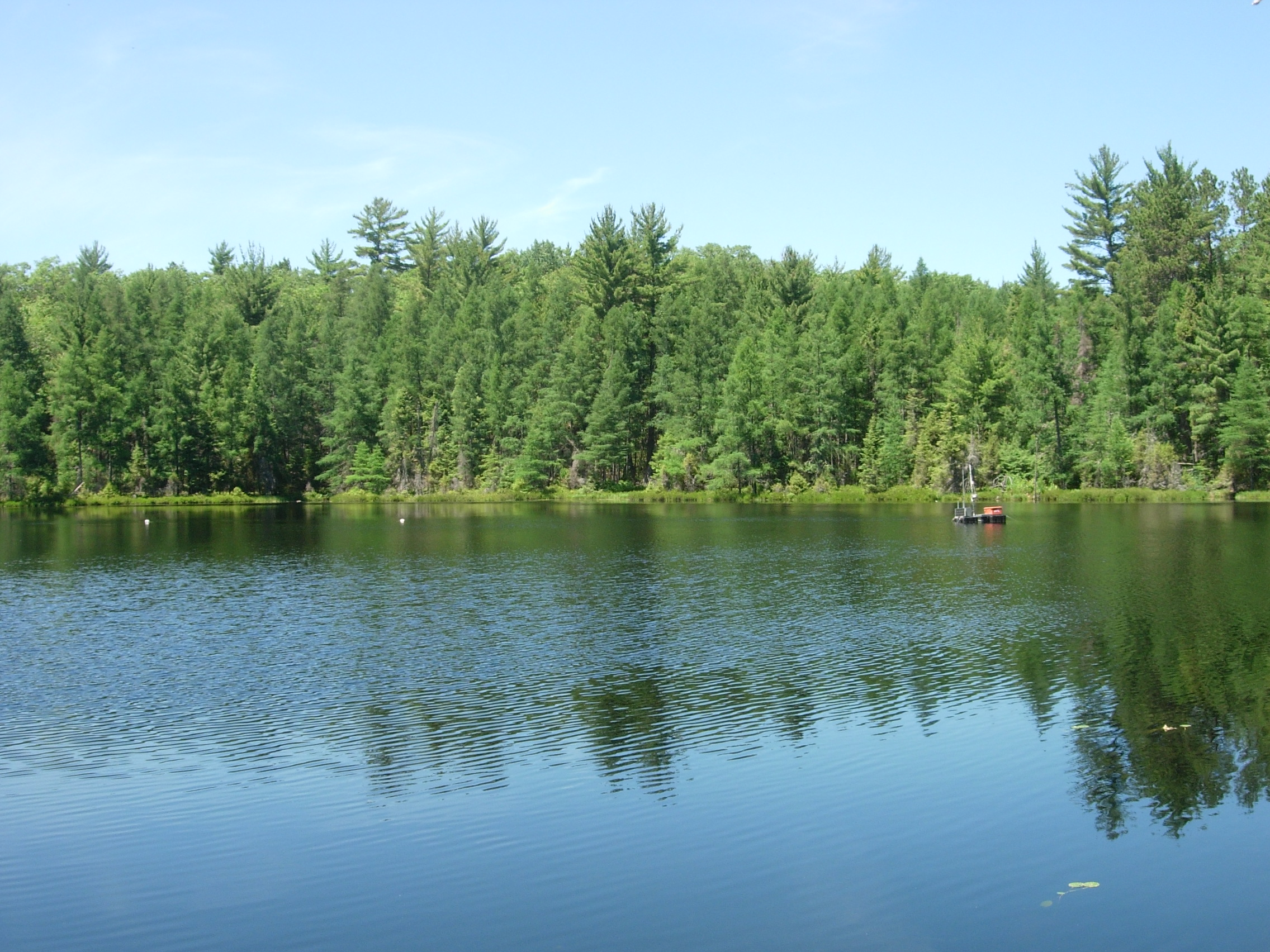
- Trout Bog Lake, with the GLEON buoy visible

- Location in Wisconsin
- Location: Vilas County, Wisconsin, United States
- Coordinates: 46°02′28″N 89°41′10″W
- Type: Bog
- Basin countries: United States
- Surface area: 1.1 ha (2.7 acres)
- Max. depth: 7.9 m (26 ft)
- Surface elevation: 499 m (1,637 ft)

Trout Bog Lake, also known as Bog 12-15, is a small bog lake in Vilas County, Wisconsin. It is located near the south basin of the much larger Trout Lake. The lake is entirely surrounded by vegetation, except for a logging road that provides access to it. Being a bog, the pH is extremely low; on average it is 4.8.

== Limnology and Trout Bog ==
Trout Bog Lake is one of seven lakes studied at the North Temperate Lakes Long Term Ecological Research Network (LTER) site. The lake also houses a sensor buoy, which feeds data to the Global Lake Ecological Observatory Network (GLEON).

== Fish species ==
Very few fish species call Trout Bog home. The most common species by far in the lake is the central mudminnow. Bluegill and black bullhead have also been recorded.
