= Frederick Rossini =

American chemist

Frederick Dominic Rossini (July 18, 1899 – October 12, 1990) was an American thermodynamicist noted for his work in chemical thermodynamics.

In 1920, at the age of twenty-one, Rossini entered Carnegie-Mellon University in Pittsburgh, and soon was awarded a full-time teaching scholarship. He graduated with a B.S. in chemical engineering in 1925, followed by an M.S. degree in science in physical chemistry in 1926.

As a result of reading Lewis and Randall's classical 1923 textbook Thermodynamics and the Free Energy of Chemical Substances he wrote to Gilbert N. Lewis and as a result he was offered a teaching fellowship at the University of California at Berkeley. Among his teachers were Gilbert Lewis and William Giauque. Rossini's doctoral dissertation on the heat capacities of strong electrolytes in aqueous solution was supervised by Merle Randall. His Ph.D. degree was awarded in 1928, after only 21 months of graduate work, even though he continued to serve as a teaching fellow throughout this entire period. He worked at the National Bureau of Standards (Washington, DC) from 1928 to 1950.

In 1932, Frederick Rossini, Edward W. Washburn, and Mikkel Frandsen authored "The Calorimetric Determination of the Intrinsic Energy of Gases as a Function of the Pressure." This experiment resulted in the development of the Washburn Correction for bomb calorimetry, a decrease or correction of the results of a calorimetric procedure to normal states.

In 1950, he published his popular textbook Chemical Thermodynamics. In that year he also moved to the Carnegie Institute of Technology (Pittsburgh), where he remained until 1960. He served as dean of the Notre Dame College of Science from 1960 to 1967.

In 1973 Rossini spent the spring academic quarter at Baldwin-Wallace College, in Berea Ohio, as the first distinguished professor to occupy the Charles J. Strosacker Chair of Science.

Awards

- In 1965 he became the recipient of the Laetare Medal.
- In 1965 he received the John Price Wetherill Medal.
- In 1966 he received the William H. Nichols Medal.
- In 1971 he received the Priestley Medal.
- In 1977 he received the National Medal of Science for his "contributions to basic reference knowledge in chemical thermodynamics."
