= Francis J. Castellino =

American biochemist

- Education: University of Scranton (BS); University of Iowa (PhD)
- Occupation: Biochemist
- Scientific career
- Fields: Biochemistry

Francis J. Castellino (also known as Frank Castellino) is an American biochemist and professor at University of Notre Dame. He is known for his contributions to the study of hemostasis, infection, and inflammation, particularly in relation to sepsis. He has extensively researched the Streptococcus pyogenes strain AP53, focusing on bacterial and mouse transgenesis and genetics.

== Early life and education ==
Frank Castellino grew up in Pittston, Pennsylvania. He received a B.S. degree in chemistry in 1964 from the University of Scranton, followed by a Ph.D. in biochemistry in 1968 from the University of Iowa. He subsequently completed a postdoctoral fellowship supported by the National Institutes of Health at Duke University.

== Career ==
Castellino began his academic career at the University of Notre Dame in 1970 as an assistant professor in the department of chemistry and biochemistry. He became a full professor in 1977 and was appointed Kleiderer-Pezold Professor of Biochemistry in 1982.

From 1979 to 2002, he served as the dean of the Notre Dame College of Science, overseeing advancements in research and education in the sciences. In 1996, he founded what would become known as the W. M. Keck Center for Transgene Research at Notre Dame. The center was renamed in 1998 after receiving funding from the W. M. Keck Foundation to expand its infrastructure.

Castellino has conducted research in numerous areas within the field of fibrinolysis, hemostasis, and inflammation. He has investigated the biochemical properties of plasminogen and its role in fibrinolysis, especially Kringle 2 domain; developed gene knockout and mutant mice models in hemostasis studies; explored the interaction between Group A Streptococcus and host proteins to understand bacterial pathogenesis; studied Vitamin K-dependent gamma-carboxylated peptides from venomous cone snails as models for protein coagulation domains; and carried out studies on Angiostatin.

== Honors and awards ==
Castellino has been recognized with the NIH Research Career Development Award (1974–1979), a Camille and Henry Dreyfus Teacher-Scholar Award (1974–1979), the Educator of the Year Award, Michiana Executive Journal (1995), and the Wyeth-ISFP Prize for Research in Fibrinolysis (2008).

He was elected a fellow of the American Association for the Advancement of Science (AAAS) in 1988.

Castellino received honorary Doctor of Science degrees from the University of Scranton (1982) and the University of Waterloo (1994).

== Editorial roles ==
Castellino has served as editor-in-chief of Current Drug Targets (1998–2024) and as an editorial board member of Journal of Biological Chemistry, Biotechnology and Applied Biochemistry, and Frontiers of Structural Biology.

== Personal life ==
He is married and his three children all graduated from the University of Notre Dame.
