= Lough Furnace =

Lake in County Mayo, Ireland

- Loch na Foirnéise (Irish)
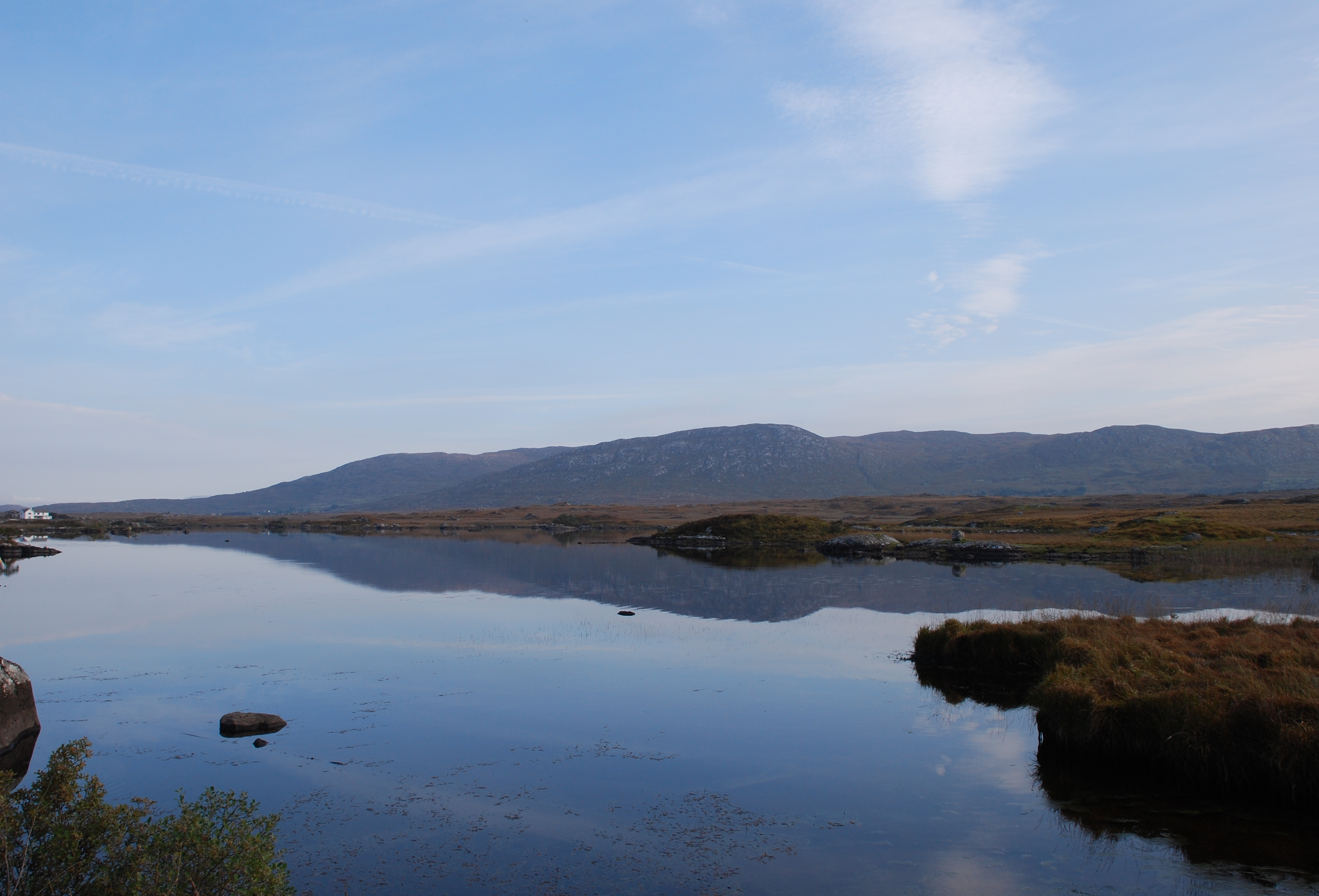

- Location within Ireland
- Location: County Mayo, Ireland
- Coordinates: 53.916698°N 9.570908°W
- Lake type: Saline Lagoon
- Primary inflows: Lough Feeagh, Yellow River
- Primary outflows: Burrishoole Channel, to Clew Bay
- Catchment area: Burrishoole
- Basin countries: Ireland
- Surface area: 1.5 km^{2} (0.58 sq mi)
- Max. depth: 20 metres (66 ft)
- Surface elevation: 4 m (13 ft)
- Islands: Inishower, Illanroe, Saint's Island

Lough Furnace (Irish: Loch na Foirnéise) is a tidally-influenced, meromictic, saline lagoon in County Mayo, Ireland, located south of Lough Feeagh. It receives freshwater inflow from the upstream Lough Feeagh at the base of the Burrishoole Catchment and tidal input of saline water from Clew Bay, through the Burrishoole Estuary.

The lagoonal estuary is notable for the perennially anoxic deep water in the main inner basin. Tidal currents transport salty, dense oceanic water from Clew Bay into the inner basin and river inflows form a buoyant seaward surface layer. The large density contrast between these two water layers limits vertical mixing and the salty, dense bottom water becomes isolated and develops stagnant, anoxic conditions. Given the highly unusual physical environment, Furnace has served as a model system for important ecologically-motivated research including the population dynamics of euryhaline invertebrates, a paleolimnological reconstruction of its evolution toward anoxic conditions, which appears to have occurred at ca. 3400 calendar years before present, divergent evolution in fish ecotypes, bio-physical interactions between benthic fish and internal waves and dynamics of sub-surface chlorophyll maxima.

Lough Furnace is the lower part of the Burrishoole fishery. It contains salmon, grilse and sea trout.

== See also ==
- List of loughs in Ireland
