= Mikkel Frandsen =

American chemist

- Born: 1892; Ringkøbing-Skjern municipality, Denmark
- Died: 1981 (aged 88–89)
- Education: University of California
- Scientific career
- Workplaces: National Bureau of Standards,

Mikkel Frandsen (1892–1981) was a Danish American physical chemist noted for experiments involving chemical thermodynamics, oil, and heavy water. Also known as deuterium oxide (D_{2}O), heavy water is used to produce nuclear power and is used in other nuclear applications such as nuclear magnetic resonance spectroscopy.

== Early years ==
Frandsen was born in the parish of Sønder Lem in the town of Ringkøbing in Ringkøbing-Skjern, Midtjylland, Denmark. He emigrated from Denmark to the United States in 1921. Frandsen earned his Ph.D. in physical chemistry from the University of California in 1926.

In 1928, Frandsen invented the Liquid Phase Cracking Process, discovering that when oil is heated to a point at which cracking (chemistry) takes place, the heat consumed causes the oil temperature to decrease. This results in an increased yield of gasoline and a decreased knocking tendency of gasoline.

== Heavy Water ==
In 1931 while at the National Bureau of Standards (NBS), Frandsen began a study with Edward W. Washburn (1881-1934), chief of the NBS and his assistant Edgar R. Smith, the results of which were published in "The Isotopic Fractionation of Water" (1933). In Frandsen et al.'s experiment, the scientists subjected water to electrolysis, and an isotope fractionation took place. The heavy water produced displayed a higher density than regular water. Heavy water has a higher freezing point, higher boiling point, and lower refractive index than regular water.

Heavy water differs from regular water in that the two atoms of hydrogen have been substituted with two atoms of deuterium, which is an isotope of hydrogen. The mass of heavy water is about 10% more than that of regular water due to the extra neutron in deuterium. Heavy water was discovered by Gilbert N. Lewis in 1933.

In 1934, Frandsen, along with Washburn and Smith, also published "On Change in Density, Index of Refraction, Boiling Point, and Freezing Point of Water after Electrolysis."

== National Bureau of Standards ==
From 1931 to 1934, Frandsen authored or co-authored a series of experiments while at the National Bureau of Standards, the first of which was entitled, Cryoscopic Constant Heat of Fusion, and Heat Capacity of Camphor (1931). In 1932, Frederick Rossini, Washburn, and Frandsen authored "The Calorimetric Determination of the Intrinsic Energy of Gases as a Function of the Pressure." This experiment resulted in the development of the Washburn Correction for bomb calorimetry, a decrease or correction of the results of a calorimetric procedure to normal states.

Frandsen also co-authored two articles with Merle Randall in 1932, The Standard Electrode Potential of Iron and the Activity Coefficient of Ferrous Chloride and Determination of the Free Energy of Ferrous Hydroxide from Measurements of Electromotive Force. Randall, along with Lewis, wrote one of the most influential books in chemical thermodynamics, Thermodynamics and the Free Energy of Chemical Substances (1923). In 1933, Frandsen conducted research on the Heat Capacity of Phosphorus Pentoxide. Another of Frandsen's experiments in 1933 was entitled, A Method of Determining Solvent Properties of Volatile Thinners in Varnishes.

== Later years ==
In 1952, working at the U.S. Naval Gun Factory, Frandsen conducted chemical and spectrographic analyses of steels and copper alloys that led to a more effective testing procedure, the Quantometric Method. His research led to an article entitled, "Preparation of Vanadium Monoxide (1952)."

== Related Reading ==
- Coffey, Patrick Cathedrals of Science: The Personalities and Rivalries That Made Modern Chemistry (Oxford University Press. 2008)
