= Kathleen Weathers =

Ecosystem scientist

- Born: Grand Rapids, Michigan
- Education: Albion College, Yale University, Rutgers University
- Known for: Ecosystem ecology
- Scientific career
- Workplaces: Cary Institute of Ecosystem Studies

Kathleen C. Weathers is an ecosystem scientist and the G. Evelyn Hutchinson Chair in Ecology at the Cary Institute of Ecosystem Studies. Her expertise focuses on understanding the ecology of air-land-water interactions. Weathers was the elected President of the Ecological Society of America from 2020 to 2021.

== Early life and education ==
Weathers was born in Grand Rapids, Michigan and raised in Ada, Michigan. She spent summers at a family residence on Lake Sunapee, New Hampshire, which motivated her interest in ecology and ecosystem management. She completed a B.A. in English at Albion College, M.F.S. in Forest Science at Yale University, and Ph.D. in Ecology at Rutgers University. Her early research, published in Nature, was one of the first studies to show that fog, in addition to rain, can contribute to acid pollution to forests.

== Career and research ==
Weathers is an ecosystem ecologist at the Cary Institute of Ecosystem Studies, where she has spent most of her research career. Her research interests are broad and she has significantly contributed to our understanding of atmospheric ecology, terrestrial ecology, and aquatic ecology. To date, Weathers has written or contributed to over 300 peer-reviewed articles, which have received over 22,000 citations. Her research is focused on understanding of how air-water-land interactions affect ecosystem functioning. For example, she has worked with colleagues to quantify how fog and precipitation can both provide critical nutrients to forest ecosystems, but also harmful pollutants. Other notable research has studied the effects of storms on lake water quality and coupled human-ecosystem interactions.

She is the lead editor of the foundational textbook Fundamentals of Ecosystem Science with David Strayer and Gene Likens. In addition to co-authoring the textbook, Weathers has led multiple synthesis efforts in ecosystem science, including setting a research agenda for the discipline.

Weathers has taken many leadership roles within the ecological community that have informed policy. Weathers served as the elected President of the Ecological Society of America from 2020-2021 and was the elected Chair of the National Atmospheric Deposition Program (2011-2012). She served on the EPA Clean Air Scientific Advisory Committee from 2009-2015 and was on the National Academy of Sciences' National Transportation Board Committee to evaluate the Congestion Mitigation and Air Quality Program during 2000-2002.

Weathers was the elected Co-Chair of the Global Lake Ecological Observatory Network (GLEON) from 2011-2018, where she led the 800-person grassroots network in developing a new training model for graduate students and team science approaches for scientific working groups. Weathers' training model is to explicitly empower early career scientists to take leadership roles in collaborative research projects. Under Weathers' guidance, early career GLEON researchers have led many collaborative projects, including studies on how road salt and climate change affect lakes.

In addition to leading international research networks and scientific societies, Weathers is the Research Director of the Lake Sunapee Protective Association, where she facilitates scientific engagement between the public and researchers. As part of this role, Weathers has catalyzed multiple research studies on Lake Sunapee, which has led to new understanding on the sensitivity of low-nutrient lakes to land use change and cyanobacterial blooms. Weathers also serves on the Mohonk Preserve Board of Directors, currently as its Vice Chair, and is a long-time member of the Mohonk Preserve Conservation Science Committee, currently serving as its Chair (as of Fall 2020).

== Awards and honors ==
Weathers has received many awards during her career, including Elected Fellow of the American Association for the Advancement of Science (AAAS) in 2002, Elected Fellow of the Ecological Society of America in 2015, G. Evelyn Hutchinson Chair in Ecology at the Cary Institute of Ecosystem Studies in 2016, the Eugene P. Odum Education Award from the Ecological Society of America in 2017, and the NSF Director's Award in 2010.
