= Global Lake Ecological Observatory Network =

- Nickname: GLEON
- co-chair: Lisette de Senerpont Domis
- co-chair: Rafa Marcé
- co-chair emeriti: Paul C. Hanson, Bas Ibelings
- co-chair emerita: Kathleen C. Weathers
- Website: http://gleon.org/

Global Lake Ecological Observatory Network (GLEON) is an international grass-roots, voluntary network of researchers, educators, and community groups interested in making and utilizing time series of high-frequency observations made on and in lakes and reservoirs all over the world. GLEON includes more than 60 lake observatories and more than 850 individual members from 62 countries on six continents (as of January 2021). GLEON uses innovative human capacity building for discovery, solving problems, catalyzing and creating learning communities, education, FAIR data, and Open Science.

== Goals ==
The goal is to understand, predict, and communicate the impact of natural and anthropogenic influences on lake and reservoir ecosystems. The researchers include limnologists, ecologists, information technology experts, and engineers who have a common objective of building and growing a scalable, persistent network of lake ecology observatories; developing new theoretical models based on the more extensive spatial and temporal scales of data; integrating new technologies to utilize the data; educating a new generation of researchers in team science; and engaging the public. Each lake or reservoir observatory consists of one or more instrumented platforms capable of sensing key limnological variables and moving the data in near-real time to web-accessible databases. The types of sensors employed at these observatories include: temperature, dissolved oxygen, dissolved carbon dioxide, phytoplankton pigments such as chlorophyll and phycocyanin, as well as devices that detect water movements such as acoustic Doppler current profilers (ADCP.) Many of the observatories also track meteorological parameters on the lake such as solar radiation, wind speed, and relative humidity. Data from the network of observatories will allow a better understanding of key processes such as the effects of climate and land use change on lake or reservoir function, the role of episodic events such as typhoons in resetting aquatic dynamics, and carbon cycling within lakes and reservoirs.

== Participating lakes and organizations ==
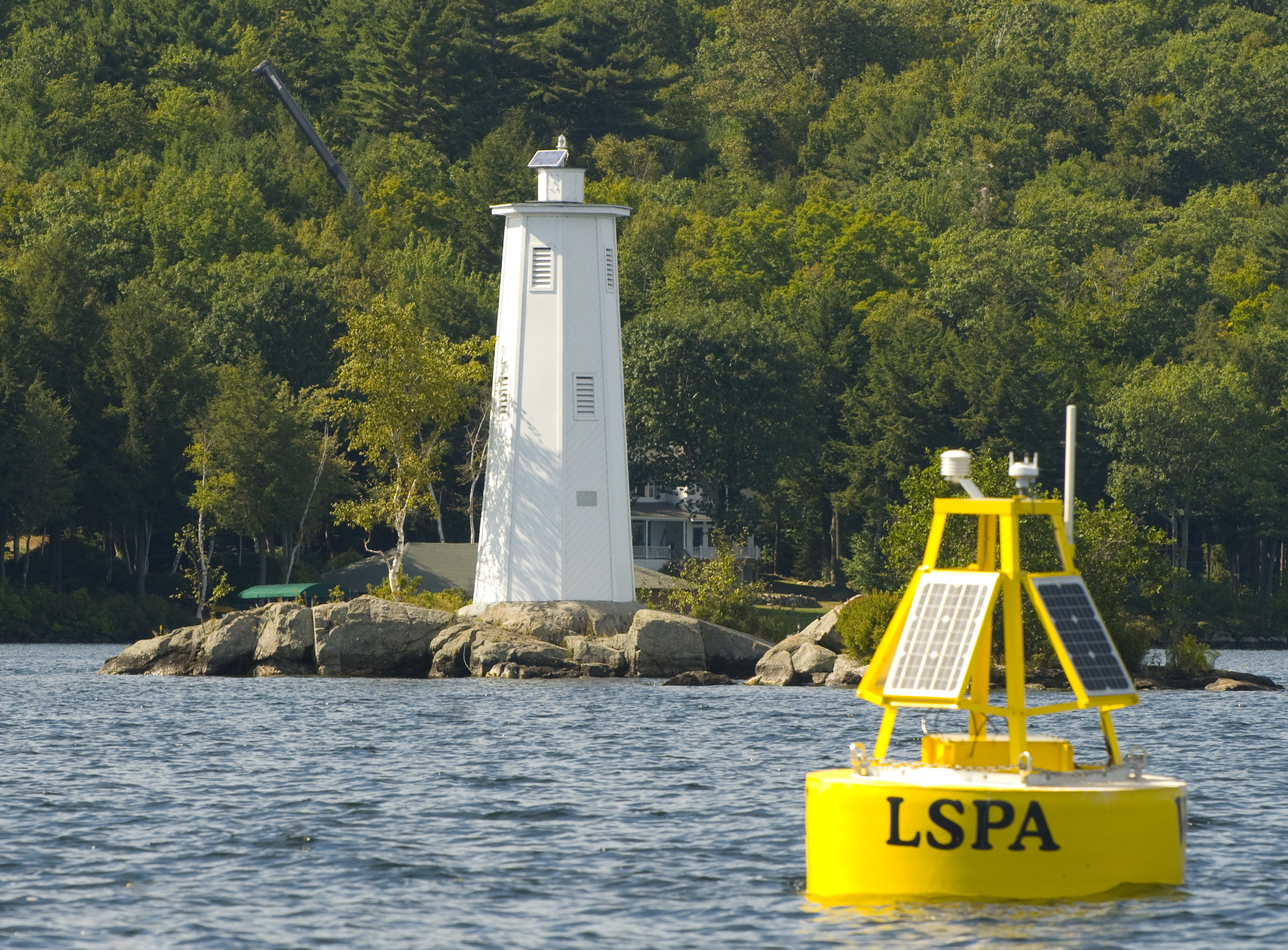

- Lough Feeagh, County Mayo, Ireland
- Lake Erken, Uppsala University, Sweden
- Douglas Lake, University of Michigan Biological Station, Michigan, USA
- Sparkling Lake, Wisconsin USA
- Trout Bog Lake (Vilas County, Wisconsin)
- Crystal Bog Lake, Wisconsin, USA
- Trout Lake, Wisconsin, USA
- Lake Mendota, Wisconsin, USA
- Lake Sunapee, New Hampshire
- Lake Rotorua, New Zealand
- Yuan-Yang Lake, Taiwan
- Lake Kinneret, Israel
- Chaffey Dam, Nundle, NSW
- Euiam, South Korea
- Soyang, South Korea
- Lake Paajarvi, Lammi Finland
- Lake Annie, Lake Placid, Florida
- Lake Taihu, Jiangsu Province, China
- West Long Lake, University of Notre Dame Environmental Research Center, Michigan, USA
- Big Spirit Lake, Spirit Lake, Iowa, USA
