= Lough Feeagh =

Lake in County Mayo, Ireland

- Loch Fíoch (Irish)
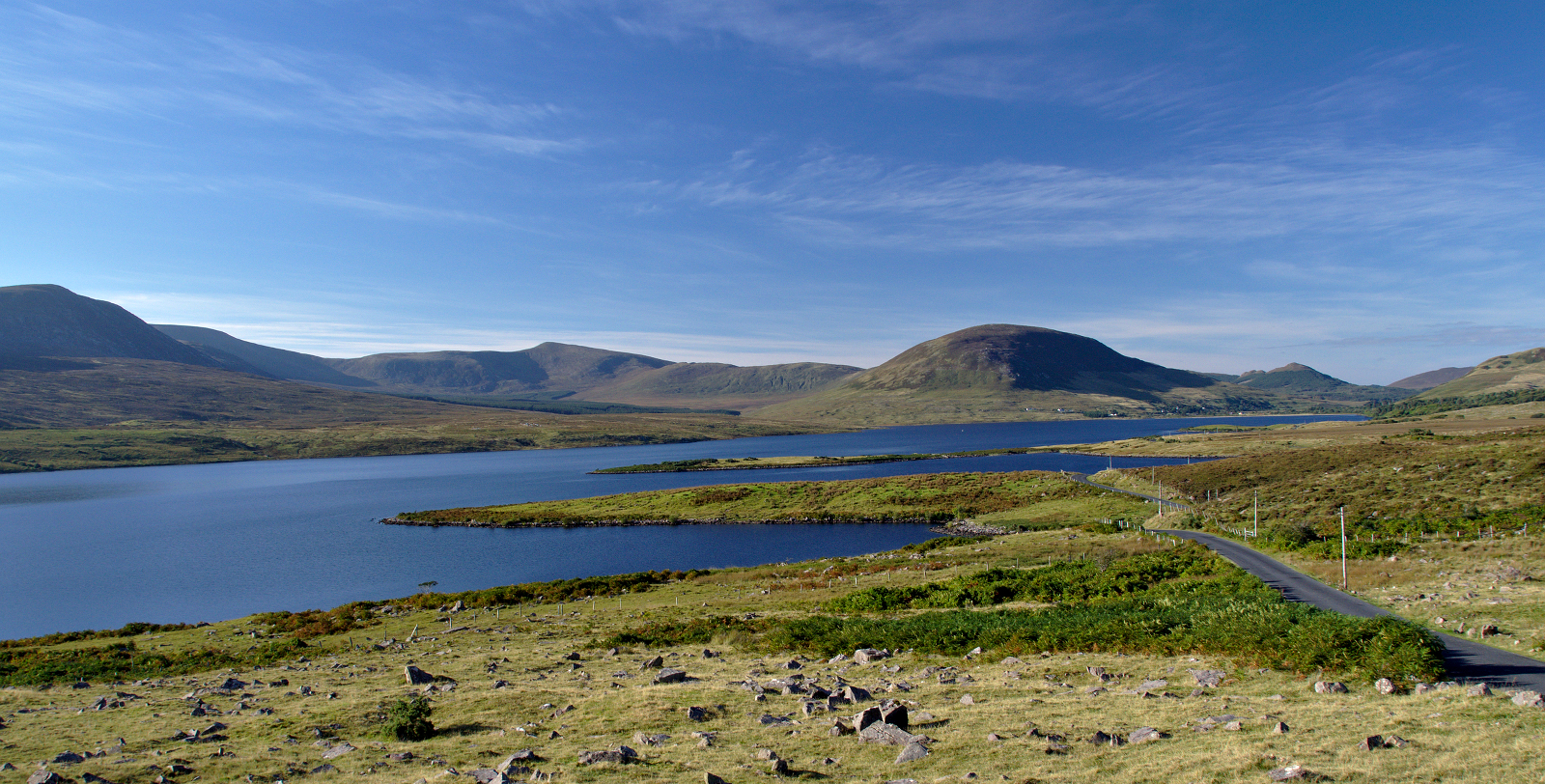

- Location in Ireland
- Location: County Mayo
- Coordinates: 53°56′56″N 9°34′32″W
- Type: oligotrophic
- Catchment area: 84.68 km^{2} (32.70 sq mi)
- Basin countries: Ireland
- Surface area: 3.95 km^{2} (1.53 sq mi)
- Average depth: 14.5 m (48 ft)
- Max. depth: 45 m (148 ft)
- Residence time: 0.47 year
- Surface elevation: 11 m (36 ft)

Lough Feeagh (Irish: Loch Fíoch) is a freshwater lake in County Mayo, Ireland. It is the largest of the lakes in the Burrishoole catchment, which consists of seven lakes and interconnecting rivers and streams. Lough Feeagh is one of the lakes observed and studied by the Global Lake Ecological Observatory Network (GLEON).

Lough Feeagh drains into Lough Furnace, which then drains through the short Burrishoole Channel into Clew Bay.

The remains of an Iron Age promontory fort named Leaba Dhiarmada agus Gráinne (Diarmuid and Gráinne’s bed) exists on a peninsula of land which reaches into the lake.

== See also ==
- List of loughs in Ireland
