= Trout Lake (Wisconsin) =

Lake in Wisconsin, USA

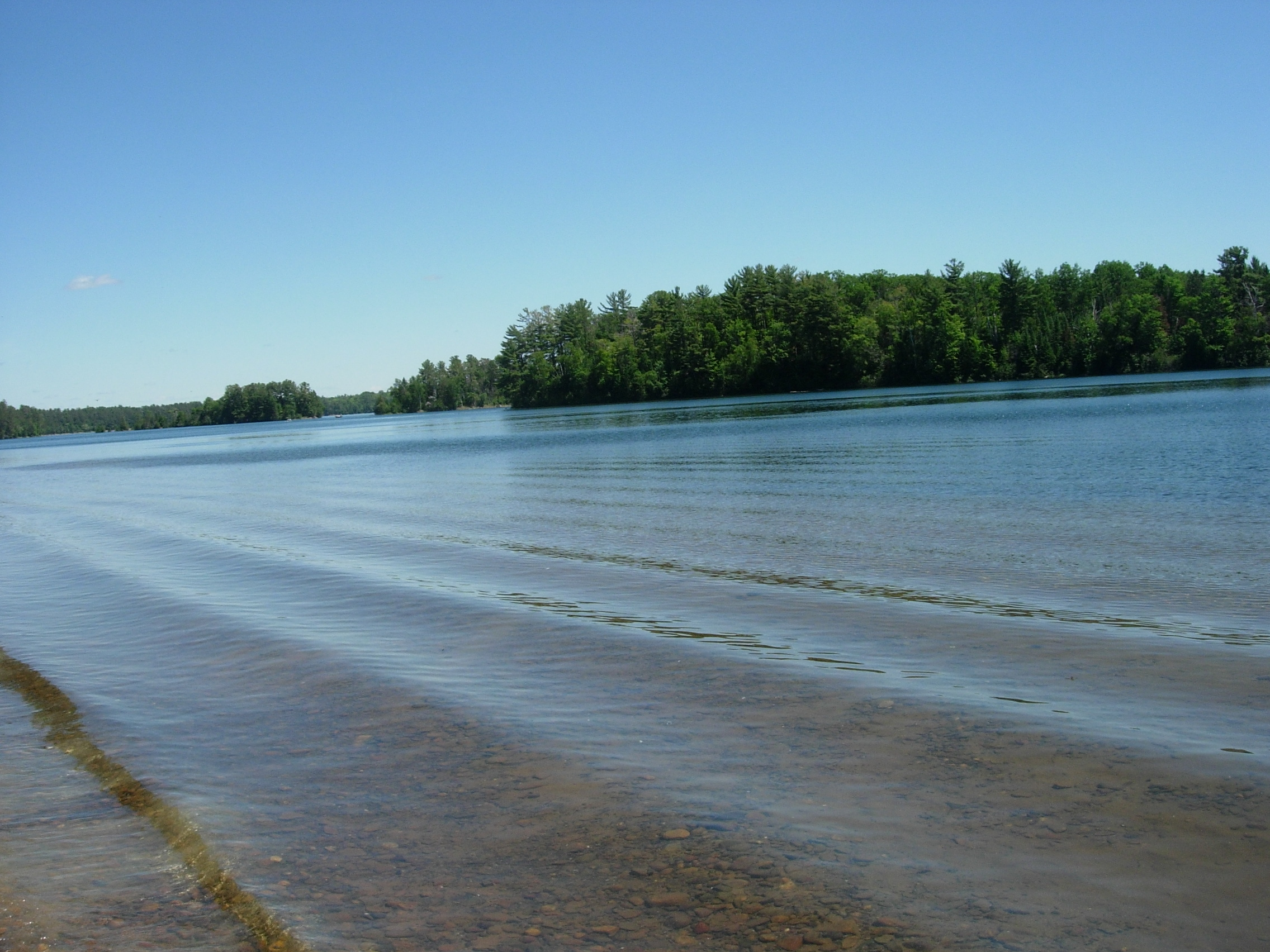
- South basin of Trout Lake, with Haunted Island, Easter Island, and Fisk Island in view

- Location within Wisconsin Location within the United States
- Location: Vilas County, Wisconsin
- Coordinates: 46°02′35″N 89°40′15″W
- Type: Kettle lake
- Primary inflows: North Creek, Stevenson Creek, Allequash Creek, Mann Creek
- River sources: Trout River
- Primary outflows: Trout River
- Basin countries: United States
- Max. width: 1.36 mi (2.19 km)
- Surface area: 6.208 sq mi (16.079 km^{2})
- Average depth: 49 ft (14.9 m) (mean)
- Max. depth: 117.0 ft (35.66 m)
- Water volume: 0.058 cu mi (0.240 km^{3})
- Shore length^{1}: 16.1 mi (25.9 km)
- Surface elevation: 1,614 ft (492 m)
- Max. temperature: 79.30 °F (26.28 °C)
- Min. temperature: 32.418 °F (0.232 °C)
- Frozen: 78–171 days
- Islands: 7
- ^{1} Shore length is not a well-defined measure.

Trout Lake is in Vilas County, Wisconsin, near the towns of Boulder Junction and Arbor Vitae, Wisconsin. With a surface area of 6.208 sq mi (16.079 km^{2}) and a volume of 0.058 cu mi (0.240 km^{3}), Trout Lake is one of the largest lakes in Vilas County. It has 16.1 mi (25.9 km) of shoreline, a large portion of which is undeveloped. There are also seven islands within the lake: Miller Island, Zimmerman Island, Haunted Island, Easter Island, Fisk Island, Chocolate Drop Island, and an unnamed island. It is a dimictic oligotrophic lake that supports a large number of sport fish, which has made it a popular angling destination.

== Physical aspects ==
=== Geography ===
Trout Lake's contributing watershed comprises an area of 43.44 sq mi (112.52 km^{2}). The lake has a maximum width of 1.36 mi (2.19 km) and a surface elevation of 1,614 ft (492 m). Trout Lake is part of Vilas County which is highly interconnected with bodies of water, with lakes and ponds covering more than 15% of its total area.

=== Geology ===
The lake's origin is as a glacial drainage lake, classified more specifically as a kettle lake. The lake bottom includes gravel, marl, rubble and bedrock, with the surface rock composition of the Trout Lake region determined by Pleistocene era deposits. Glacial drumlin fields still remain west of Trout Lake which include a loamier soil makeup, while soil in non-drumlin or moraine areas of Vilas County are sandy with a relatively low water capacity, stemming from glacial outwash.

=== Hydrology ===
Trout Lake has a maximum depth of 117.0 ft (35.66 m), maximum fetch of 3.65 mi (5.87 km) and maximum surface wave height of approximately 2 ft 7 in (0.8 m). The water reaches a maximum temperature of 79.30 °F (26.28 °C) and a minimum of 32.418 °F (0.232 °C), contributing to a frozen period range of approximately 78–171 days. Its primary inflows are North Creek, Stevenson Creek, Allequash Creek, and Mann Creek.

== Water quality ==
Trout Lake is a oligotrophic lake based on a mean summer Secchi depth of 5 m. Trout Lake is dimictic, meaning it mixes twice a year (spring and fall), and is thermally stratified in the summer and winter. Past surveys have also indicated a mesotrophic classification. The lake sports a 9 ft 2 in – 34 ft 9 in (2.8–10.6 m) annual depth range in Secchi disk-measured water visibility from 1981 to 2020.

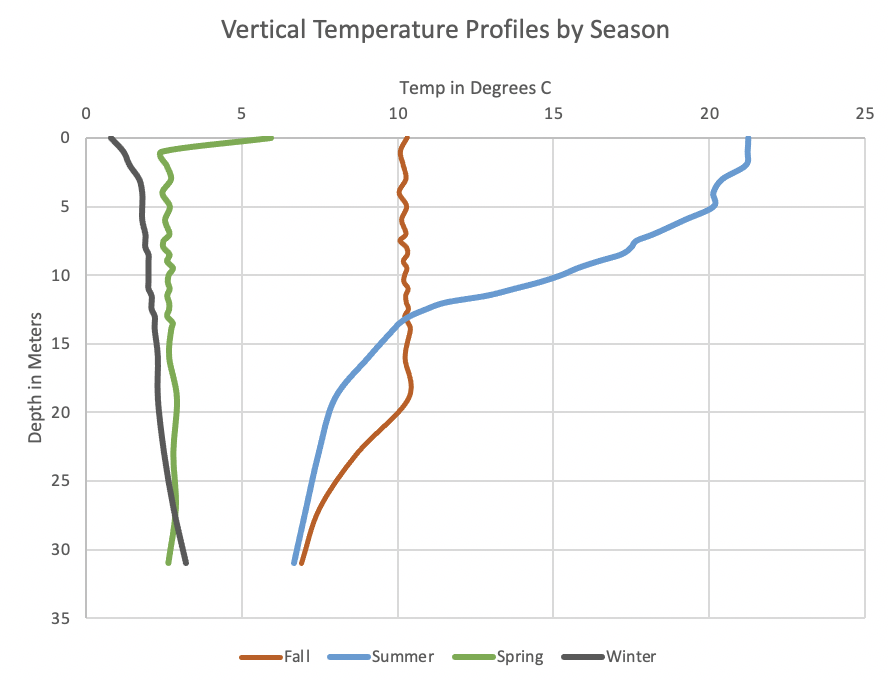
Temperature profile of Trout Lake in degrees Celsius by depth in meters for spring, summer, fall, and winter

== Wildlife ==
=== Flora ===
As of 2019, there were 16 submersed macrophyte species sampled within the lake, including these:

- Coon's tail
- Canadian waterweed
- Grassleaf mudplantain
- Alternateflower watermilfoil
- Slender watermilfoil
- Nodding waternymph
- Large-leaf pondweed
- Least pondweed
- Robbins pondweed
- Flat-stem pondweed
- Broadleaf arrowhead

The tip of the eastern-side peninsula which splits the north and south portions of Trout Lake is called Cathedral Point, and is populated with a stand of tall white pines. Trout Lake Conifer Swamp State Natural Area is directly below the southeast corner of the lake, and it contains white cedar, tamarack, black spruce, and balsam fir trees, with much of the ground there coated in sphagnum moss.

=== Present-day fauna ===
Trout Lake is known for good fishing due to its productivity and overall fish populations. Trout Lake is one of the few inland lakes in Wisconsin to host lake trout.

According to LTER surveys, 42 species have been found in Trout Lake including:

- Bowfin
- Trout-perch
- Lake trout
- Lake whitefish
- Cisco (fish)
- Northern pike
- Muskellunge
- Burbot
- Largemouth bass
- Smallmouth bass
- Rock bass
- Bluegill
- Yellow perch
- Walleye

The area around Trout Lake is known to be visited by black bears and browsed by white-tailed deer.

== Environmental concerns ==
=== Pollution ===
Overall, pollution has not been a major factor within Trout Lake due to the tree-covered watershed that surrounds it, which prevents the significant introduction of pollutants into the lake.

=== Invasive species ===
The lake has a serious problem with the invasive rusty crayfish, which has destroyed fish habitat. Specimens of the invasive Viviparus georgianus, or banded mystery snail, have also been verified within Trout Lake beginning in 2011. In addition, the invasive European zooplankton Bythotrephes longimanus or spiny water flea has also established numbers within Trout Lake, and its population density began to be surveyed in 2014. If the spread of the spiny water flea is not contained, its predation on endemic herbivorous zooplankton can lead to a severe decline in water quality via a trophic cascade, which has been observed in places such as Lake Mendota in Wisconsin.

== Origins and history ==
=== Native American history ===
In middle of the 1700s, the Ojibwa established control of the Manitowish Waters area, including Trout Lake. By 1783, the Ojibwa had gained the entire Lac du Flambeau region to the southwest of Trout Lake as part of their territory, and during this era maintained six main villages in the Manitowish Waters and Lac du Flambeau areas. These included sites at Lac du Flambeau, Turtle Portage, Trout Lake, Lac Vieux Desert, Pelican Lake, and the Wisconsin River. At the same time, the Ojibwa fought the Dakota people to the west of Trout Lake, including within the Chippewa River basin. By the 1870s, treaty enforcement with the United States (including one finalizing the Ojibwa's last release of land to the United States in 1854) as well as the introduction of new settlers and infrastructural development had restricted the Ojibwa mostly to reservations and stopped their visits to the traditional villages.

=== 20th-century history ===
In the late 1800s to early 1900's, there was a logging operation near Trout Lake in Boulder Junction. To help transport products from local sawmills, Yawkey Bissell Lumber Co. built an extension of the Milwaukee Railroad Line from Velasco Junction (east side of Trout Lake) to one mile north of Trout Lake in 1905. Further expansion of the railway happened in 1913 when Milwaukee Railroad Company purchased the previously built line from Yawkey Bissell Lumber Co. This included two stops on Trout Lake.

With added miles of track, the area surrounding Trout Lake saw many tourists. In 1888, John Manns opened a small hotel in Minocqua. However, the small hotel could not accommodate all the travelers, so Manns decided to buy one mile of frontage property on the south side of Trout Lake for a new resort. This resort was called "The Manitowish". Around 1916, John Manns sold the resort to Jesse Coons, who then sold it to Dan and Helen Cardinal. Over the next eight years, a total of fifteen cottages were established to go along with the resort lodge. Other resorts on Trout Lake during this era included Coon's "Franklin Lodge" and "Rocky Reef". Coon's "Franklin Lodge" is still open.

In 1907, the State of Wisconsin purchased 662 acres (268 ha) of land that became the start of Northern Highlands State Forest. Later, in 1912, another 27,000 acres (11,000 ha) were purchased for the park. By 1996, a total of 222,000 acres (89,840 ha) encompassing Vilas, Oneida, and Iron counties made up the now Northern Highland and American Legion State Forests.

=== First DNR field station ===
Formerly called the Wisconsin Conservation Department (WCD), Wisconsin Department of Natural Resources (DNR) built its first headquarters and field station in 1911, at Trout Lake. There were also a number of roads, phone lines, ranger stations, and fire towers. Trout Lake was the sight of the first forest fire patrol by air. Logan Archbold Vilas, nicknamed Jack, was a famous aviator who was part of these historic first flights. He brought his Curtis Hydro Aeroplane to Trout Lake by train from Chicago, IL. During his time at the Trout Lake, he took rangers from the ranger station on several of his flights over Northern Highlands State Forest.

=== First state nursery ===
In 1911, WCD planted the first state pine plantation consisting of Norway Pine, Ponderosa Pine, and Norway Spruce. The trees came from the University of Michigan. In 1916, WCD established the first state tree nursery at Trout Lake, consisting of two one-acre plots. The trees grown at the nursery were used to replant areas within the state park, but some were also sold to the public.

== Human use/cultural significance ==
=== Recreation ===
Trout Lake hosts a variety of both summer and winter activities. In the summer, the lake is a popular fishing location, swimming destinations, has numerous hiking trails, and has several campgrounds. There are websites that monitor fish catches based on species and size across lakes, including Trout Lake, so other anglers are able to find the best fishing locations and times of year. A popular hiking destination is the aforementioned Cathedral Point, located on the narrow passage between the North and South portions of the lake. Surrounded by 130 ft (40 m) pine trees, the slight rise in elevation at Cathedral Point allows for fantastic views of the lake. For winter activities, while there is less activity overall, the lake still has tourists. Winter activities include ice fishing, ice hockey, and ice wind boarding, which is similar to windsurfing, but on ice. There are also several lodges and resorts scattered around the lake. In 2025, Marywood, a retreat center located on the lakeshore, was returned to the Lac du Flambeau Band of Lake Superior Chippewa, in one of the first transfers of land from Catholic sisters to a tribal government.

=== Research ===
Trout Lake is one of seven lakes studied at the North Temperate Lakes Long Term Ecological Research Network (LTER) site. The lake houses a sensor buoy, which feeds data to the Global Lake Ecological Observatory Network (GLEON). Trout Lake is also home to the University of Wisconsin–Madison Trout Lake research station, where research on lakes and streams in the area is carried out. Once, when the research station needed to be moved from its old location to the new location on the other side of the lake, the structure was pulled on the frozen lake and slid across the ice. The former research laboratories were transformed into cabins for student-housing.

== See also ==
- List of lakes of Wisconsin
