= Merle Randall =

American physical chemist

Merle Randall (January 29, 1888 – March 17, 1950) was an American physical chemist famous for his work with Gilbert N. Lewis, over a period of 25 years, in measuring reaction heat of chemical compounds and determining their corresponding free energy. Together, their 1923 textbook "Thermodynamics and the Free Energy of Chemical Substances" became a classic work in the field of chemical thermodynamics.

In 1932, Merle Randall authored two scientific papers with Mikkel Frandsen: "The Standard Electrode Potential of Iron and the Activity Coefficient of Ferrous Chloride," and "Determination of the Free Energy of Ferrous Hydroxide from Measurements of Electromotive Force."

== Education ==
Randall completed his Ph.D. at the Massachusetts Institute of Technology in 1912 with a dissertation on "Studies in Free Energy".

== Related ==
Based on work by J. Willard Gibbs, it was known that chemical reactions proceeded to an equilibrium determined by the free energy of the substances taking part. Using this theory, Gilbert Lewis spent 25 years determining free energies of various substances. In 1923, he and Randall published the results of this study and formalizing chemical thermodynamics.

According to the Belgian thermodynamicist Ilya Prigogine, their influential 1923 textbook led to the replacement of the term "affinity" by the term "free energy" in much of the English-speaking world.

== See also ==
- Ionic strength
