= Mary Galvin (American academic) =

American scientist

Mary Ellen Galvin
- Education: Massachusetts Institute of Technology
- Scientific career
- Thesis: Modification of polyacetylene : blends and block copolymers (1984)
- Doctoral advisor: Gary E. Wnek

Mary E. Galvin is an American scientist and the former Dean of the University of Notre Dame College of Science.

== Education ==
She earned her BA in chemistry at Manhattanville College and her MSc and PhD degrees in polymers and materials science at the Massachusetts Institute of Technology.

== Career and Research ==
Galvin worked at Bell Laboratories following the completion of her doctorate work until 1998, when she joined the faculty at the University of Delaware. In 2005, Galvin entered the private sector as a technical lead in new technology development at Air Products and Chemicals, Inc. In 2013, she became the director of the Materials Science division at the National Science Foundation, and then in 2015 began as the dean of the Notre Dame College of Science.

== Awards ==
- Fellow of the American Physical Society - 1999
- Elected fellow of the Materials Research Society.
- Served on the board of directors for the Materials Research Society. - 2008 to 2009
- Served on the Advisory Council for the Gordon Research Conferences - 2001 to 2003
- Director's Award for Collaborative Integration, National Science Foundation - 2012
