= Mary Galvin (Irish academic) =

Irish academic

Mary Galvin is an Irish academic and mental health advocate.

== Scholarship ==
Galvin received her doctorate at University College Cork, before going on to work at Trinity College and University College Dublin. She is perhaps best known for her interdisciplinary work on the relationship between technology and mental health, focusing on conditions like dementia.

Galvin has published in journals like Leonardo (The MIT Press) and Digital Scholarship in the Humanities (Oxford University Press).

An open source application that Galvin designed to help elicit and share personal narratives, Digital Story Cubes, received some 10,000 installations on Android. The app was selected as a finalist for the Europeana Design Challenge in 2015.

== Advocacy ==
In 2013, Galvin was a finalist in the Higher Education Authority's Making an Impact Competition, in which she discussed the role that consumer technologies can play in supporting individuals suffering from dementia.

She is a member of the board at the Coolmine Therapeutic Community, a registered Irish charity providing treatment for drug and alcohol addictions.

In a 2017 interview, she outlined her belief that research can be used to bring about positive change in public health: "No experience is the same and what is great is that I get the chance to collect these experiences in the hope of bringing about change in healthcare policies and or how healthcare practitioners can improve their interactions with their patients."

== Personal ==
Galvin is originally from Kilmacthomas, Co. Waterford.
