= University of Notre Dame Environmental Research Center =

American research center

- Established: 1936
- Location: United States
- Website: https://underc.nd.edu/

University of Notre Dame Environmental Research Center (UNDERC) has two locations in North America serving as natural laboratories for scientists studying ecology and environmental biology. These locations offer the opportunity to study environmental systems that have experienced little or no degradation from humans and as a baseline for comparison with human disturbed systems.

== UNDERC-East ==
UNDERC-East location.

UNDERC-East encompasses 7,500 acres (30 km^{2}) (land = 6,150 acres (24.9 km^{2}) and lakes/bogs/streams = 1,350 acres (5.5 km^{2})) lying at 46°13′N 89°32′W along the state line of Wisconsin (Vilas County) and Michigan (Gogebic County). It includes a land area of 6150 acres and 30 lakes and bogs.

UNDERC-East hosts a variety of habitats for research including:

- Dystrophic bogs
- Permanent and vernal ponds
- Lakes of various shapes and sizes
- Marshes
- Sluggish headwater streams
- Mixed deciduous and coniferous forest
- Deciduous forest

UNDERC-East also serves as the National Ecological Observatory Network (NEON) site for increasing the understanding of how forest management impacts ecological processes in the Great Lakes Region (Domain #5).

== UNDERC-West ==
UNDERC-West location.

UNDERC-West was founded in 2006 and lies at 47°29′N 114°16′W and is located in the Mission Valley of Montana (Lake County). UNDERC-West encompasses more than 1,000,000 acres (4,000 km^{2}) administered by the Confederated Salish and Kootenai Tribes with whom the University of Notre Dame partners in the UNDERC-West project. The research program at UNDERC-West has closed.

== Notable Researchers ==
- Arthur Hasler
- Edward Birge
- Chancey Juday
- David Lodge
- James Elser
- James Kitchell
- Stephen Carpenter
- Kathryn L. Cottingham
