= Columbus Murals =

Series of twelve murals at the University of Notre Dame

- Sighting of Land, Friday, October 12, 1492, one of the Columbus Murals
- Artist: Luigi Gregori
- Year: 1882 - 1884
- Location: Notre Dame, IN
- Owner: University of Notre Dame
- Website: www.nd.edu/about/history/columbus-murals/

The Columbus Murals are a series of twelve murals depicting Christopher Columbus, painted in the 1880s by Luigi Gregori and displayed in the Main Building at the University of Notre Dame in Indiana, US. The murals have been a source of controversy in recent decades for their romanticized portrayal of Columbus and his relationship with Native Americans.

University founder Edward Sorin commissioned Gregori, an Italian artist who had previously worked for the Vatican, to paint the series, which he completed from 1881 to 1884. Columbus was chosen as the subject because he was seen by Americans as a heroic figure at the time, particularly by Catholics who were facing Anti-Catholic sentiment. As such, Columbus is painted in a saintly manner, while the natives are shown as submissive and filled with awe. In recent decades, however, the murals have faced criticism for their historical inaccuracies and prominent position in Notre Dame's primary administration building, and in September 2020 they were covered with removable prints showing local flora and fauna.

== History ==
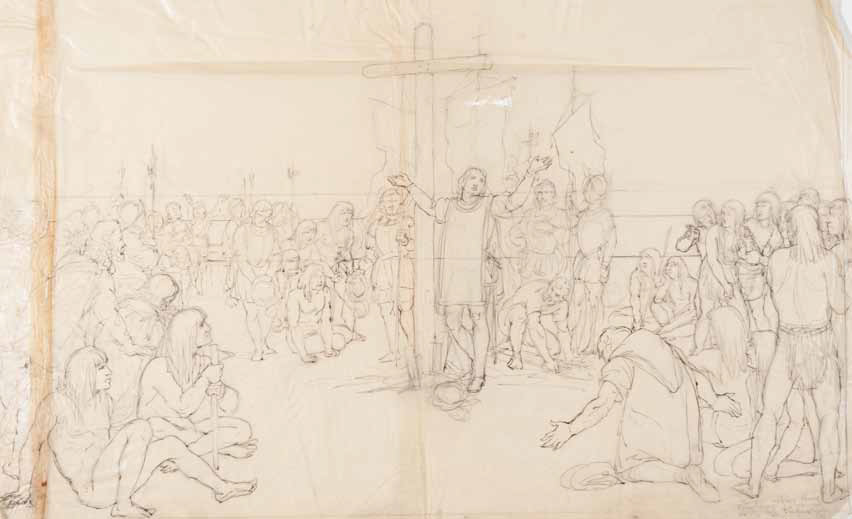
Gregori's sketch of Columbus Coming Ashore, black ink over graphite on tracing paper

In 1874, founder and former university president Edward Sorin visited the Vatican and hired Luigi Gregori, an artist-in-residence there, to be an art professor at Notre Dame. An 1879 fire destroyed the campus's Main Building, but it was rebuilt during that summer; two years later, Sorin commissioned Gregori to create a collection of artwork to decorate the first floor (Note: "First floor" refers to the floor above the ground floor, following the European scheme of floor numbering.) of the new Main Building.

In the nineteenth century, Americans thought of Columbus as a heroic figure and a symbol of independence, progress, and faith, which went along with the manifest destiny movement. Columbus was also an appealing figure to Notre Dame's faithful population, as Catholics had rallied behind him as a rare Catholic contributor to the mostly Protestant history of the US. The figure also helped fight the nineteenth-century nativism movement, particularly against Italian Americans, and anti-Catholic sentiment—stemming from the view that Catholics were loyal to the pope before their country.

Gregori began the first painting, called Christopher Columbus, Explorer, in mid-November 1881 and finished it before the end of the year. He painted the other eleven murals from 1882 to 1884, completing each one as funds were donated by faculty and other private individuals. He used pigment with casein paint to do his work on the plaster walls. However, the plaster was dry, so they are not true frescoes.

At the time, scholars disputed Columbus's physical appearance, and no authoritative portrait existed, so Gregori used then-current president Thomas E. Walsh as the model for Columbus's face in all but one mural and Sorin for Columbus on his deathbed. Notre Dame faculty, Congregation of Holy Cross members, benefactors, and Gregori himself also served as models for other people in the murals.

Contemporary accounts and descriptions of the murals are complimentary and reflect the positive image of Columbus. An account in the New York Freeman's Journal, published in 1886 in the Notre Dame Scholastic, says that "some of [the] students are young and careless; but the pictures are treated with respect, almost with reverence, and no boyish hand has attempted to deface the walls".

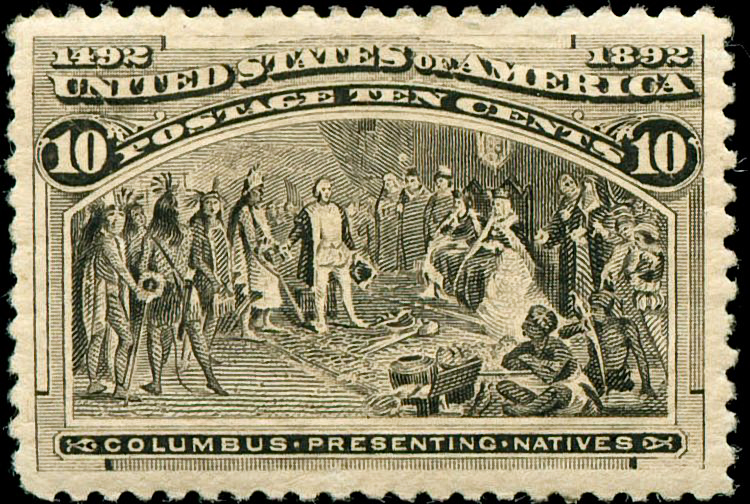
"Columbus Presenting Natives", a Columbian Issue postage stamp based on The Reception at Court

In honor of the 1893 World's Columbian Exposition, the Columbian Issue, a set of sixteen commemorative postage stamps, was created, and the 10¢ stamp was based on The Reception at Court mural.

== Description ==
The murals are each 11 feet (3.4 m) tall, ranging in width from 5.5 to 19 feet (1.7 to 5.8 m). They are all located in a hallway south of the central rotunda of the Main Building. The twelve paintings are:

1. Christopher Columbus, Discoverer or Christopher Columbus, Explorer—It shows Columbus standing tall next to a globe, in an akimbo posture with his hand on his hip, suggesting importance and influence. He points to North America on the globe, although he never recognized that he had landed on the continent.
2. Isabella the Catholic, Protectress of Columbus
3. Columbus at the Gate of the Convent of La Rabida
4. Father Perez Blesses Columbus before He Embarks—It depicts Juan Pérez with Columbus before departure from Palos de la Frontera.
5. The Mutiny at Sea
6. Discovery of Land, Friday, October 12, 1492 or Sighting of Land, Friday, October 12, 1492
7. Taking Possession of the New World or Columbus Coming Ashore
8. Return of Columbus and Reception at Court
9. Bobadilla Betrays Columbus—Francisco de Bobadilla in Columbus' cottage
10. Death of Columbus, Valladolid, May 20, 1506
11. Father Diego de Deza, Protector of Columbus at Salamanca—It depicts Diego de Deza, the son of Ferdinand and Isabella, who helped Columbus gain access to them.
12. Luis de Santangel, Treasurer of Aragon—Luis de Santángel helped Columbus secure funding for his voyage.

The murals portray Columbus in a saintly light, and Gregori painted scenes showing Columbus as doing God's work. The Reception at Court depicts Columbus presenting treasures of the New World to King Ferdinand II and Queen Isabella I of Spain: pineapples, nuts, spices, gold figurines, a parrot, as well as several Taíno people. The presence of a large number of clergy indicates that the natives are to be baptized. A large crowd watches behind them, and in the background is a fleet of ships.

There are numerous historical inaccuracies in the murals. In The Reception at Court, for example, the natives are depicted holding shields which northern Plains Indians would use and wearing Mandan clothes, whereas Columbus actually encountered the Taíno of the Caribbean. The inaccuracies are attributed to a combination of ignorance (at the time, Native Americans were seen as a monolithic group, rather than a diverse group of tribes) and intentional symbolism (Notre Dame's founding Holy Cross missionaries encountered Plains Natives). Furthermore, Gregori may have drawn inspiration from Notre Dame's own collection of artifacts.

== Controversy ==
A group of Indigenous students were the first to campaign for the murals' removal in the 1970s. The 500th anniversary of Columbus's voyage two decades later resurfaced protests against the pieces, and in 1997, a faculty committee created a brochure to offer historical context to the murals, saying that "the University of Notre Dame recognizes that the Columbus murals reflect 19th-century white European views of race, gender and ethnicity which may be offensive to some individuals".

A 2017 letter to the editor of Notre Dame's student newspaper, The Observer, signed by over 300 students, employees, and alumni, called for the murals to be removed. In January 2019, university president John I. Jenkins announced a plan to cover the murals. In September 2020, the paintings were covered with fabric decorated to resemble tapestries of plants and animals, although the coverings can be removed for faculty and other uses.

== Gallery ==
Columbus at the Gate of the Convent of la Rabida

Father Perez blesses Columbus before he embarks

The Mutiny at Sea

Sighting of Land, Friday, October 12, 1492

Columbus Coming Ashore

Return of Columbus and Reception at Court

Bobadilla Betrays Columbus

Death of Columbus, Valladolid, May 20, 1506

Christopher Columbus, Explorer

Father Diego de Deza, Protector of Columbus at Salamanca

Isabella the Catholic, Protectress of Columbus

Luiz de Santangel, Treasurer of Aragon

== See also ==
- List of monuments and memorials to Christopher Columbus
- List of monument and memorial controversies in the United States

== Sources ==
=== Journals and books ===
- Barrenechea, Antonio; Moertl, Heidrun (November 2013). "Hemispheric Indigenous Studies: Introduction". Comparative American Studies. 11 (2): 109–123. doi:10.1179/1477570013Z.00000000041. S2CID 145567907.
- Doss, Erika (June 2009). "Action, Agency, Affect: Thomas Hart Benton's Hoosier History". Indiana Magazine of History. 105 (2). Indiana University Press: 127–139. JSTOR 27792974.
- Doss, Erika (December 2018). "The Elephant in the Room: Prejudicial Public Art and Cultural Vandalism". De Arte. 53 (2–3): 4–30. doi:10.1080/00043389.2018.1481909. S2CID 192826511.
- Lamb, Charles; Hogan, Elizabeth (2017). Notre Dame at 175: A Visual History. Notre Dame, Indiana: University of Notre Dame Press. ISBN 9780268102456. JSTOR j.ctvpj7bj9.
- Lindquist, Sherry C. M. (Spring 2012). "Memorializing Knute Rockne at the University of Notre Dame: Collegiate Gothic Architecture and Institutional Identity". Winterthur Portfolio. 46 (1): 1–24. doi:10.1086/665045. JSTOR 10.1086/665045. S2CID 146612474.
- Meyers, Sophia (2012). Artist in Residence: Working Drawings by Luigi Gregori (1819–1896) (PDF). Notre Dame, Indiana: Snite Museum of Art.
- Schlereth, Thomas J. (1977). The University of Notre Dame: A Portrait of Its History and Campus (2nd ed.). Notre Dame, Indiana: University of Notre Dame Press. ISBN 0-268-01906-1.
- Schlereth, Thomas J. (December 1992). "Columbia, Columbus, and Columbianism". The Journal of American History. 79 (3). Oxford University Press: 937–968. doi:10.2307/2080794. JSTOR 2080794.
- Sullivan, Richard (1951). Notre Dame. New York City: Henry Holt and Company. OCLC 1416056.
- Tucker, Todd (2018). Notre Dame vs. The Klan: How the Fighting Irish Defied the KKK. Notre Dame, Indiana: University of Notre Dame Press. doi:10.2307/j.ctvpj7dt2. ISBN 9780268104368. JSTOR j.ctvpj7dt2. S2CID 240321663.

=== Newspapers and websites ===
- "A thing of beauty is a joy forever" (PDF). Notre Dame Scholastic. Vol. 15, no. 10. November 12, 1881. pp. 140–141.
- "Columbus Murals" (PDF). University of Notre Dame. Archived from the original (PDF) on January 12, 2020.
- Katz, Brigit (January 25, 2019). "Notre Dame University Will Cover Controversial Columbus Murals". Smithsonian.
- "Luigi Gregori—Director of the Art Department in the University of Notre Dame". The Notre Dame Scholastic. Vol. 20, no. 4. September 25, 1886. p. 66.
- Murch, Raymond M. (November 13, 1920). "Luigi Gregori—Notre Dame's Artist" (PDF). The Notre Dame Scholastic. Vol. 54, no. 8. pp. 113–116.
