= Juan Pérez (friar) =

16th-century Spanish friar

- O.F.M.
- Father Perez Blesses Columbus Before He Embarks by Luigi Gregori, c. 1883 (Columbus Murals at the University of Notre Dame)

Personal details
- Died: c. 1513
- Denomination: Roman Catholic

Juan Pérez, OFM, (died before 1513) was a Spanish friar of the OFM and a companion of Christopher Columbus.

== Life ==
Pérez once served as contador (accountant) to the Queen of Spain, ap appointment indicative of his noble birth. He later entered the Franciscan Order and Queen Isabella chose him as her confessor.

Finding court life distracting, he asked permission to retire to his friary. Soon after, he was elected guardian of the friary in La Rábida, near Palos in Andalusia. Father Francisco Gonzaga, Minister General of the Observant branch of the Order (1579–87), declared that La Rábida belonged to the Franciscan Custody of Seville, which, by decree of Pope Alexander VI on 21 September 1500, was raised to the rank of a province.

Here, Christopher Columbus, in 1484 or 1485, made the acquaintance of Pérez. Friar Antonio de Marchena, a cosmographer of some note, also lived there, and in him the navigator discovered a man bent on the project of discovering a new world. The historian Francisco López de Gómara in 1552 seems to have started the blunder, copied by almost every subsequent writer on the subject, of making the two names Perez and Marchena serve to describe one and the same person by speaking of the Father Guardian of La Rábida as Friar Juan Perez de Marchena.

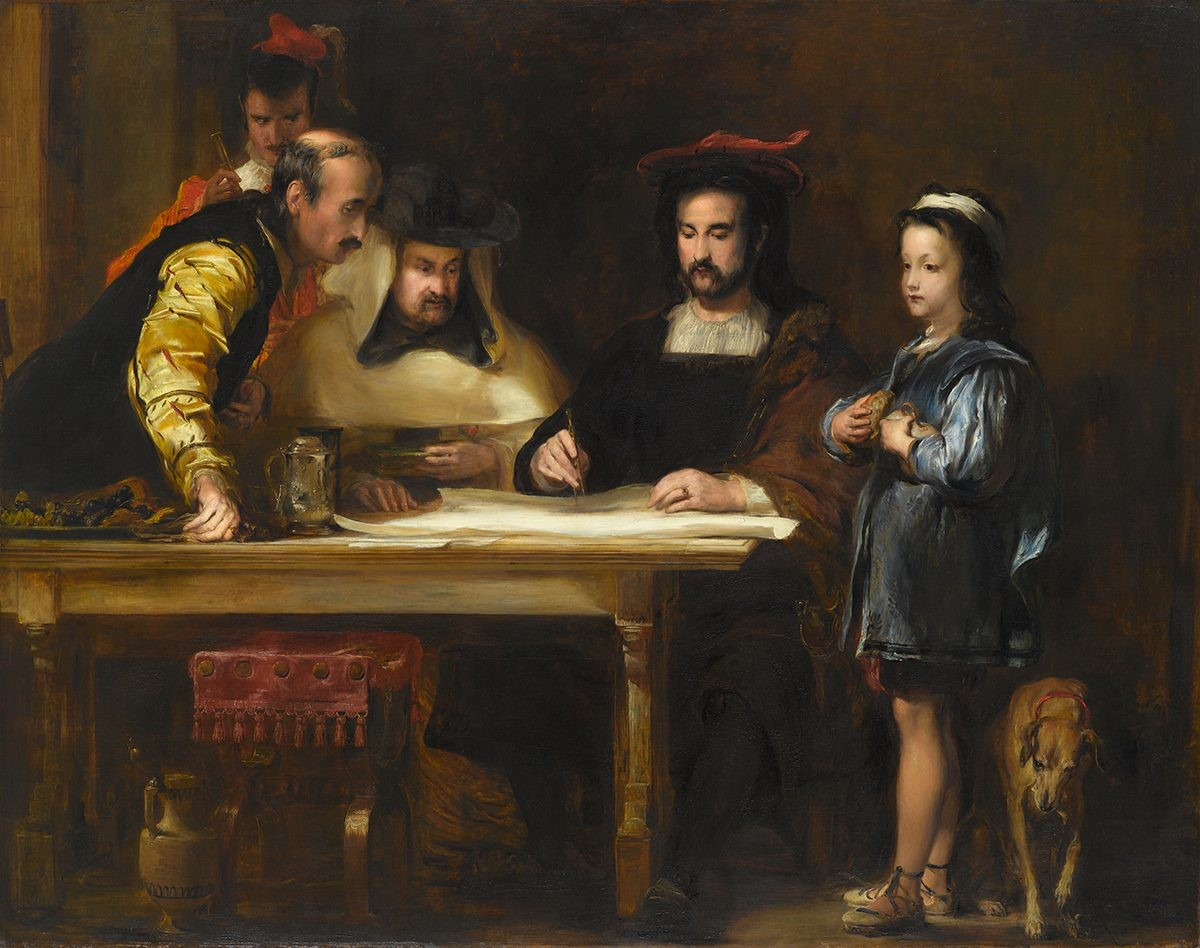
Christopher Columbus Explaining His Intended Voyage by David Wilkie, 1834

Both friars materially assisted Columbus, who acknowledges his obligation in one of his letters to the king and queen. He writes that everybody ridiculed him, save two friars who always remained faithful. Martín Fernández de Navarrete, indeed, claims that Columbus in this passage spoke of Pérez, the Franciscan, and Diego de Deza, the Dominican.

It was Pérez who persuaded the navigator not to leave Spain without consulting Isabella, when, footsore and dispirited, he arrived at La Rábida, determined to submit his plan to the King of France. At the invitation of the queen, Pérez made a journey to Santa Fe for a personal interview with her. As a result, Columbus was recalled, and with the assistance of Cardinal Mendoza and others, his demands were finally granted.

When the navigator at last, on 3 August 1492, set sail in the Santa María, Pérez blessed him and his fleet. Some writers assert that Pérez accompanied Columbus on the first voyage, but the silence of Columbus on this point renders the claim improbable. It appears certain, however, that Pérez joined his friend on the second voyage in 1493. The earliest and best writers also agree that when the second expedition reached Hispaniola, Pérez celebrated the first Mass in the New World at Point Conception on 8 December 1493, in a temporary structure; that this was the first church in America; and that Pérez preserved the Blessed Sacrament there.
