= Neecy Twinem =

American artist, author and toy designer

- Born: Missouri
- Occupations: Author artist Illustrator toy designer professor

Neecy Twinem is an American artist, toy designer, academic professor, and author and illustrator of over 35 children’s books published in several languages.

Her first children’s book was titled Aye-Ayes, Bears, and Condors: An ABC of Endangered Animals and Their Babies, published by Scientific American Books for Young Readers. Neecy’s fine art is found in private and public collections around the country. She has a Masters in Fine Art and instructs and mentors other artists. Twinem developed a brand trademark titled ZombieZoo, including the design, manufacturing, and release of a plush toy line and books. She recently developed and released a plush toy line, ZombieZoo.

She was born in Kansas City, MO, adopted at birth, and raised by Charlene B. and John Robert Twinem. She has one daughter, Tonia Herrero, an artist and educator who is one of many of Twinem's inspirations. Neecy resides in Sandia Park, New Mexico. She is a tribal member of the Sac & Fox Nation.

== Education ==
Neecy spent her early childhood living in Olathe, KS, Denver, CO and in Lincoln, NE where she spent her high school years, graduating from Lincoln Southeast High School with an honors in fine art. She studied fine art at the University of Minnesota, Minneapolis, MN and then transferred to the San Francisco Art Institute, where she graduated with a Bachelors in Fine Arts in Sculpture and Video Performance in 1980.

In 1981, she moved to New York City and worked in visual merchandising and window display design, designing window displays for Bergdorf Goodman, Macy's and Elizabeth Arden in Manhattan. She went back to school to get her master's degree in Fine Art from University of Hartford, Hartford Art School Hartford, CT.

== Publishing ==
In 1994, Neecy wrote her first children's book called Aye-Ayes, Bears and Condors, An ABC of Endangered Animals and Their Babies, published by Scientific American Books for Young Readers. Most of her books are written for young audiences and often focus on nature and animals. Her books have won numerous awards and recommendations from wildlife organizations.

=== Published books ===
- Aye-Ayes, Bears and Condors, An ABC of Endangered Animals and their Babies, 1994, Scientific American Books for Young Readers, NY, NY.
- World's Strangest Animal Facts, 1994, Sterling Publishing Co., NY
- High in the Trees, 1996 Charlesbridge Publishing, Watertown, MA.
- Changing Colors, 1996, Charlesbridge Publishing, Watertown, MA.
- The Seasons at My House, 1996 American Editions Pub., Columbus, OH.
- Welcome to Gullah Gullah Island Paper Doll Book, 1996, Little Simon, Simon & Schuster, NY.
- In the Air, 1997, Charlesbridge Publishing, Watertown, MA.
- Edgar Badger's Fix-it Day, 1997, Mondo Publishing, NY, NY.
- In the Ocean, 1998, Charlesbridge Publishing, Watertown, MA.
- Bug Hunt, 1999, Grosset & Dunlap, (a part of Penguin Putnam USA) NY.
- Peek at a Pond, 1999, Grosset & Dunlap, NY.
- Edgar Badger's Fishing Day, 1999, Mondo Publishing, NY.
- Edgar Badger's Butterfly Day, 1999, Mondo Publishing, NY.
- Baby Alligator, 2000, Grosset & Dunlap, NY.
- Bear Cub, 2001, Grosset & Dunlap, NY.
- Who's Home, 2003, Grosset & Dunlap, NY.
- E is for Enchantment, A New Mexico Alphabet
- Baby Coyote Counts, 2004, Rising Moon, (Northland Pub.) AZ.
- Bebe'Coyote Cuenta, 2004, Luna Rising (Northland Pub.), AZ
- Baby Snake's Shapes, 2004, Rising Moon (Northland Pub.), AZ
- Las Formas de Bebe's Serpiente, 2004, Luna Rising (Northland Pub.), AZ
- Baby Gecko's Colors, 2004, Rising Moon (Northland Pub.), AZ
- Los Colores de Bebe'Geco, 2004, Luna Rising (Northland Pub.), AZ
- Three Hungry Spiders, 2004, SmartInk, Ltd., NY
- I Love Mud, 2005, Creative Teaching Press, Inc.
- Hungry Beasties, 2006 NorthWord Books for Young Readers, MN
- Sleepy Beasties, 2006 NorthWord Books for Young Readers, MN.
- No, No, No, Little Turtles 2006, SmartInk, Ltd, NY.
- Playful Beasties, 2007, NorthWord Books for Young Readers, MN.
- Noisy Beasties, 2007, NorthWord Books for Young Readers, MN.
- Giggly Wiggly Worms A Wiggly Finger Puppet Book, 2007, Smartink Books Ltd., NY.
- Gators on the Go, 2007, SmartInk, Ltd, NY.
- Where’s Boo?, 2012, Boo2Yoo, Inc. NM.
- My Hike in the Forest, 2017, Muddy Boots / Globe Pequot, CT.
- Playful Prairie Dogs, 2020, Muddy Boots / Globe Pequot, CT.

=== Book Awards ===
- New Mexico Book Association, Southwest Book Design and Production Award, WINNER, 2022 for Playful Prairie Dogs, by Neecy Twinem.
- New Mexico Book Association, Southwest Book Design and Production Award, Finalist, 2019 for My Hike in the Forest, by Neecy Twinem.
- Science Books & Films, Best Children's Science Book Award 1995, for Aye-Ayes, Bears and Condors.
- New York Book Association Show, Second place Cover Award, 1994, for Aye-Ayes, Bears and Condors.
- The WILLA Literary Award, Finalist, 2005, for E is for Enchantment, A New Mexico Alphabet.
- Land of Enchantment Book Award, Nominee, 2007, for E is for Enchantment, A New Mexico Alphabet.
- LifeWorks' Real Life Award, 2000, for Bug Hunt.

== Art and Illustration ==
Twinem's illustration has varied over her career in subject matter and medium, but remains deeply rooted in animals and nature whether stylized or realistic. Her illustrations have been commissioned and licensed from companies such as, Innovative Kids, Nickelodeon, Penguin Putnam, Ravensburger, Rocky Mt. Elk Foundation, Scholastic, SunsOut and the U.S.D.A. Twinem developed a unique painting technique that bears inspiration from the native art and textiles of Oaxaca and other traditional Mexican folk art. In this method, paint is layered in a dry brush method to expose the texture and color layers –similar to a dark gesso- with the paint layered up to 2–3 mm deep.

=== Galleries/Exhibitions ===
- Stitching Stories, Solo Exhibition, 437co Gallery, CMU, Grand Junction, CO, 12/2021–1/2022.

The Old Schoolhouse Gallery, San Antonito, NM. Representation/Exhibition 2009–present

- Patrician Design, Albuquerque, NM. "Representation/Exhibition" 2007–present
- POP Gallery, Santa Fe, NM. "Representation/Exhibition" 2008–2009
- “Evolutions & Transitions", "Group exhibition", Framing Concepts Gallery, Albuquerque, NM, 2007
- “Give Us Wings", "Group exhibition", Henderson Fine Arts Center, San Juan College, Farmington, NM, 2002
- “Beginning of Wonder", "Group exhibition", Rockland Center for the Arts, West Nyack, NY, 2001
- B.I.G., group exhibition, Albuquerque, NM 1999
- Santa Fe Festival of the Book, Group exhibition, Santa Fe, 2000 and 2001
- Where Art Thou, Gallery of Fine Art, Columbus, NE, Representation/Exhibition, 2001–2003
- The 1999 Children's Illustration Auction and Exhibition, Joel Harris Children's Book & Art Gallery and the Pacific Book Auction Galleries, Antioch, CA, 1999

== Toy Design /Brand Development ==
In 2011, Twinem launched her first line of toys, ZombieZoo, at the 2011 International Toy Fair expo in New York City. The brand consists of a family of plush animal characters and demonstrates the unique talent and imagination found in Twinem's art and illustration. The art of ZombieZoo bears inspiration from the celebration of Dia de los Muertos, Mexican and American Folk Art as well as artists such as Tim Burton and Jim Henson. Twinem is the creator, developer and owner of the ZombieZoo brand.
