= Columbian Issue =

Set of United States postage stamps

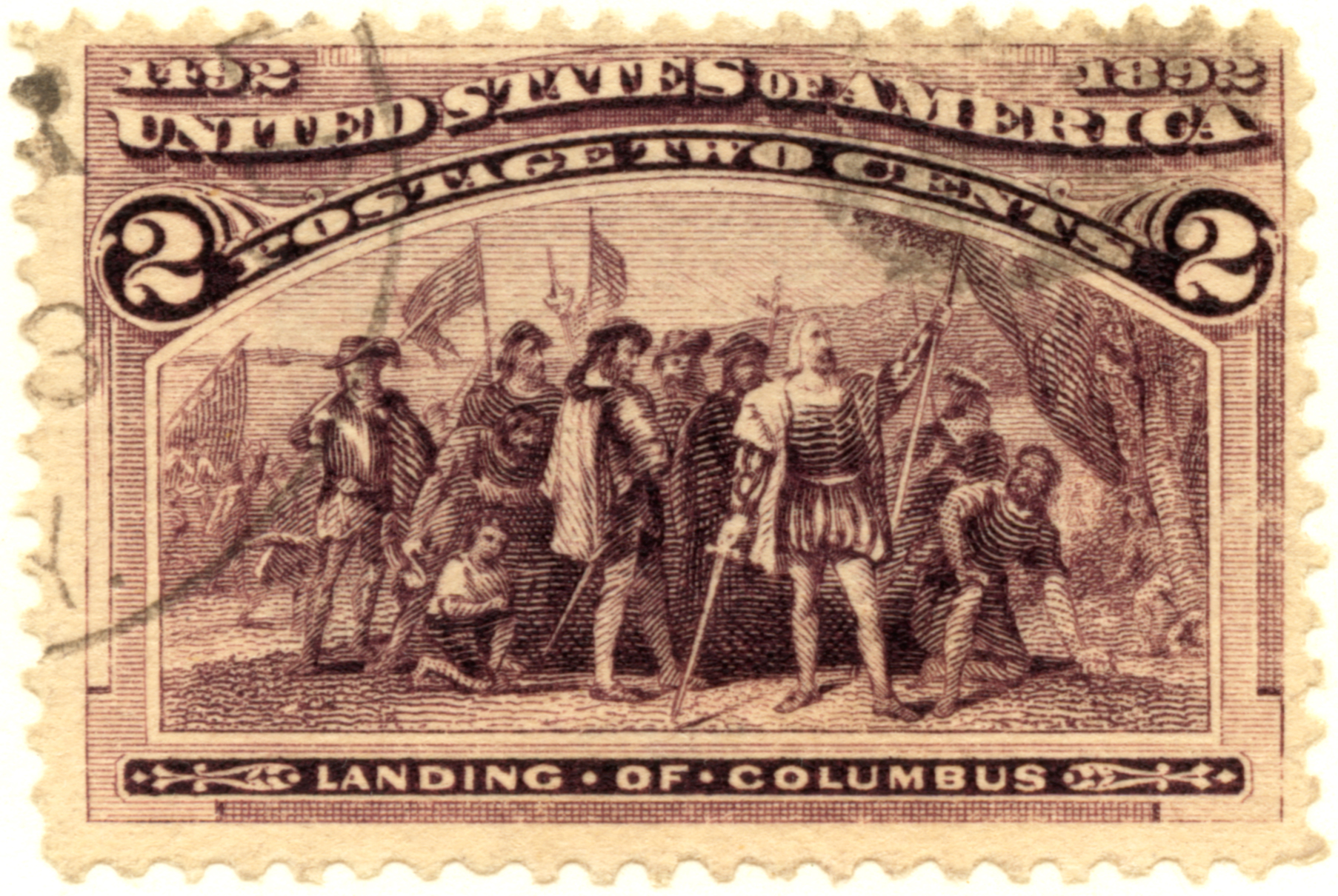
The 2¢ Landing of Columbus is the most common stamp of the Columbian Issue.

The Columbian Issue, also known as the Columbians, is a set of 16 postage stamps issued by the United States to commemorate the World's Columbian Exposition held in Chicago during 1893. The finely-engraved stamps were the first commemorative stamps issued by the United States, depicting various events during the career of Christopher Columbus and are presently much valued by collectors.

== History ==
The Columbian stamps were supplied by the American Banknote Company, which had a four-year contract for the production of United States postage stamps beginning December 1, 1889. However, where previous contracts had required printing companies to provide designs and plates at their own expense for any new stamps required by the Post Office, the 1889 contract specified that the Post Office would pay those costs. Indeed, Postmaster John Wanamaker (of department store fame) executed a new contract with American Banknote specifically for the Columbian stamps without any competitive bidding process, which allowed the company to charge 17¢ per thousand stamps, in contrast to the 7.45¢ per thousand it had been collecting for stamps of the 1890 definitive series. This arrangement prompted considerable public criticism—not allayed by American Banknote's argument that the Columbians’ size (double that of normal stamps) warranted a higher price—and Wilson Bissel, who became Postmaster General after Grover Cleveland reassumed the Presidency during March 1893, attempted to renegotiate the stamp contract on terms more favorable to the Post Office.

Fifteen denominations of the series were placed on sale by post offices on Monday, January 2, 1893. They were available nationwide, and were not restricted to the Exposition in any way. This was a larger number of stamps than the United States Post Office had ever offered in a definite series, thanks to the unprecedented inclusion of stamps denominated $1, $2, $3, $4 and $5: no U. S. postage stamp previously issued had cost more than 90¢. A sixteenth stamp—8 cents, to provide for the newly lowered registered letter fee—was added during March. As a result, the face value of the complete set was $16.34, a substantial sum of money during 1893. In approximate 2009 dollars, the set would cost almost $390. As a result, of the most expensive stamps, especially the dollar values, only a small number were sold. Unsold stamps were destroyed after the Columbian Issue was removed from sale on April 12, 1894. In all, the American Banknote Company printed more than 2 billion Columbian stamps with a total face value exceeding $40 million.

Opinion regarding the Columbian Issue at the time was mixed. The set sold well and did not have the sort of criticism that resulted in the withdrawal of the 1869 Pictorial Issue. However, approval was not universal. An organization known as the Society for the Suppression of Speculative Stamps (sometimes called the Society for the Suppression of Spurious Stamps) was created in protest of the creation of this set, deeming the Exposition in Chicago insufficiently important to be honored by postage, while some collectors balked at the Post Office Department's willingness to profit from the growing hobby of philately. Ridiculing the $5 stamp, the Chicago Tribune stated that it could be used for only one purpose: mailing a 62½-pound package of books at the book rate. The Columbians did not immediately increase in value after being removed from sale, due partly to substantial speculation resulting in a glut of stamps on the secondary stamp market for resale. However, as of 2006, depending on condition, a full set might be valued at $100,000 or more.

It was not only in design and commemorative purpose that this issue proved a watershed in U. S. stamp history. The Columbians, like all previous U. S. stamps, had been produced by private security printers on limited-term contracts periodically presented for bidding. They proved, however, to be the last U. S. stamps printed by a private company for many years. For during early 1894, the American Bank Note Company failed to secure a renewal of its stamp contract because the U. S. Bureau of Engraving and Printing submitted a lower bid; and the Bureau then enjoyed a monopoly on U. S. stamp production for decades thereafter. Not until 1944 would a private company again produce U. S. stamps (the Overrun Countries series, which required special multicolor printing) and the Bureau subsequently resumed its exclusive role in production, only gradually relinquishing it over the next sixty years (U. S. stamp operations at the Bureau ceased entirely during 2005). Scholars believe that the Bureau's first task during 1894 was to finish some Columbian sheets printed by American Banknote; what makes this theory plausible is that, while many Columbian stamps are perfectly perforated, others are distinctly substandard in this regard, with partially punched chads and/or holes that are missing, ragged or misplaced—flaws that would also mar the stamps of the first Bureau definitive issue, released later during 1894.

== 1¢ stamp ==
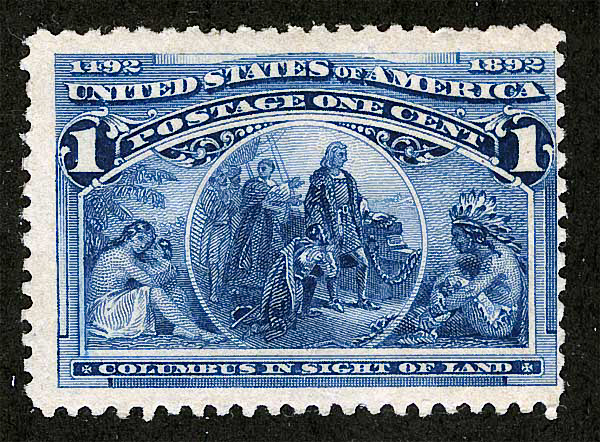
The 1¢ Columbian

Entitled "Columbus in Sight of Land", this lowest value in the set was based on a painting by William Henry Powell and was one of several to be engraved by Alfred Jones. This stamp was used primarily to pay postage on third-class mail.

Because the images in the series were not based on the works of a single artist, Columbus's appearance changes dramatically between this stamp, where he is clean-shaven, and the 2-cent value, where he sports a full beard, despite the depicted events occurring only a day apart.

== 2¢ stamp ==
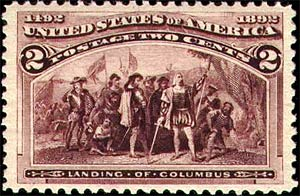
The 2¢ Columbian

John Vanderlyn's painting The Landing of Columbus, originally commissioned by Congress, and already used on $5 banknotes and the 15-cent stamp from the 1869 Pictorial Issue, was again pressed into service. By a substantial margin, this is the most common stamp of the Columbian Issue. More than a billion copies were printed, more than 70 percent of the total number of Columbian Issue stamps, in part because it paid the first-class rate for domestic mail.

Damage to one transfer roll resulted in a chevron-shaped notch in the hat of the third man on Columbus' right on some copies of this stamp. This variety, known as the "broken hat", is no longer considered significant enough for the Scott catalogue to provide it with its own minor number listing, although the catalogue still tracks separate, slightly greater, prices for the variant, which is popular with collectors.

== 3¢ stamp ==
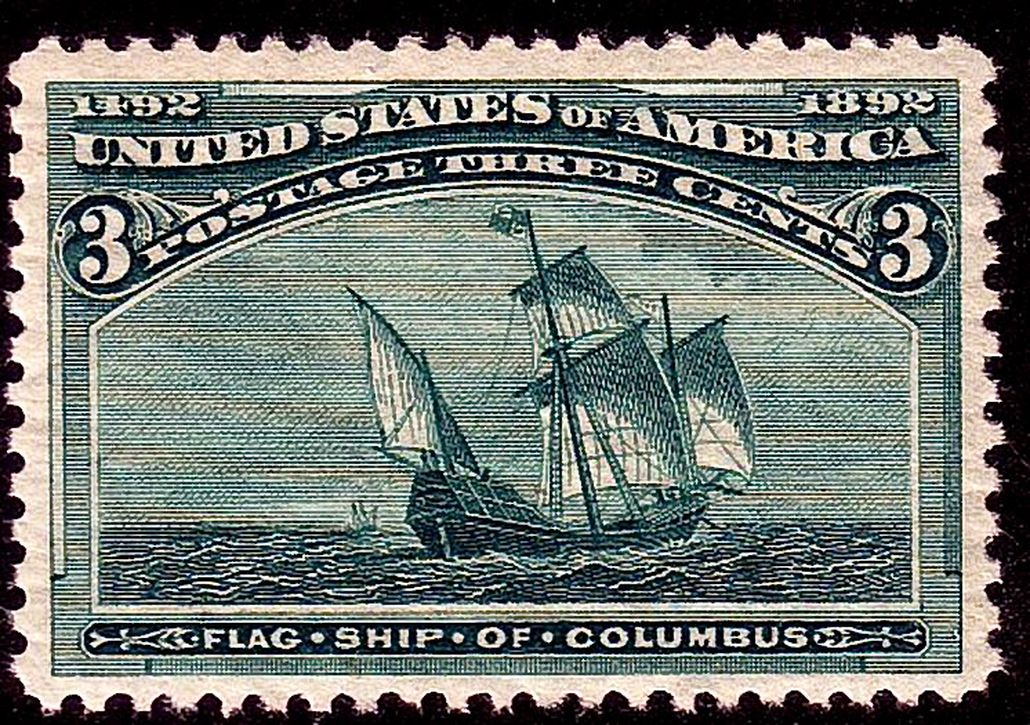
The 3¢ Columbian

Entitled "Flag Ship of Columbus", this value depicts the ship Santa Maria. It is generally believed that a Spanish engraving was the model for this stamp, but the source remains unknown. Regardless of its original source, Robert Savage performed the engraving used. Although more than 11 million were printed, this stamp also did not pay any standard postal rate during 1893. Instead it was considered a "make-up" stamp, meant to be used in combination with other small denomination stamps to pay higher rates.

== 4¢ stamp ==
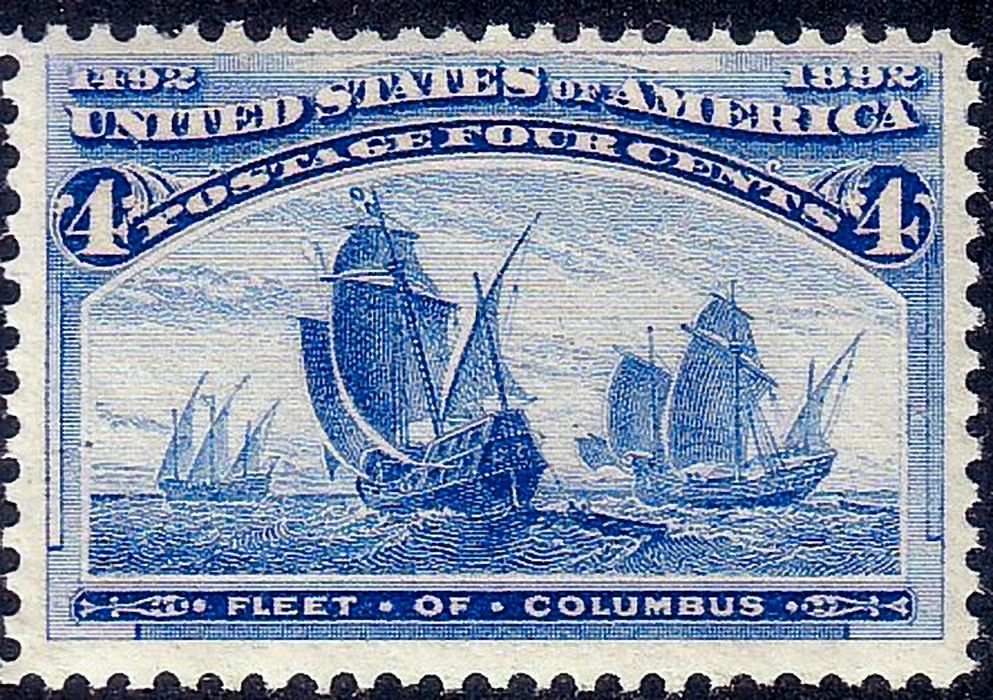
The 4¢ Columbian, ultramarine

There is some dispute regarding the origin of the design of "Fleet of Columbus". Like the previous value, it is widely attributed to an unknown Spanish engraving. However, a similar image also appeared in an American book some six months before the Exposition. There are significant differences, however, and philatelic authors researching the issue have stated that it is not possible to conclusively determine the origins of the design with the information known. The stamp itself paid the first-class rate for double-weight mail.

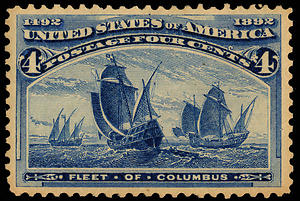
The 4c Columbian, blue, error of color

The most significant collectible variety of the set also occurs on this value. The normal color of this stamp is a shade known as ultramarine. A very small number of 4-cent stamps were printed erroneously using the wrong color ink, a significantly darker shade that more closely resembles the blue of the 1-cent stamp. At least two error sheets, totaling 200 stamps, are thought to have been produced, although significantly fewer copies are known to have survived. The "4-cent blue" is thus considered a great rarity, selling for thousands of dollars; $15,750 in 2003 but only $9,000 in 2010.

== 5¢ stamp ==
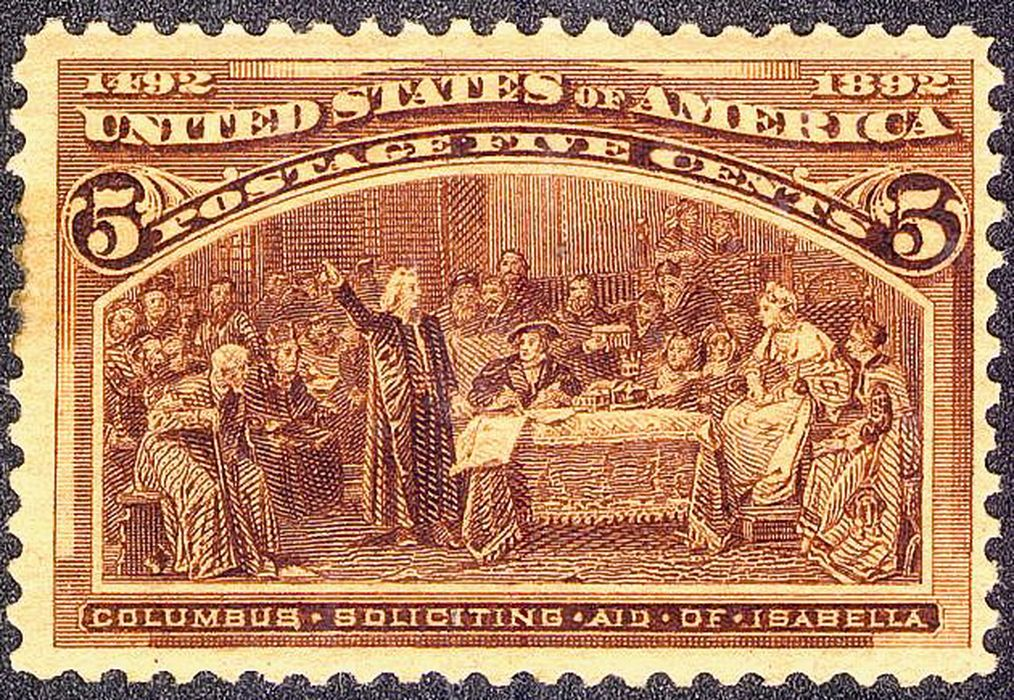
The 5¢ Columbian

Alfred Major created the design for this stamp, entitled "Columbus Soliciting Aid of Isabella", basing it off an 1884 painting by Václav Brožík called Columbus at the Court of Ferdinand and Isabella. This value was primarily used to pay the half-ounce Universal Postal Union international rate.

== 6¢ stamp ==
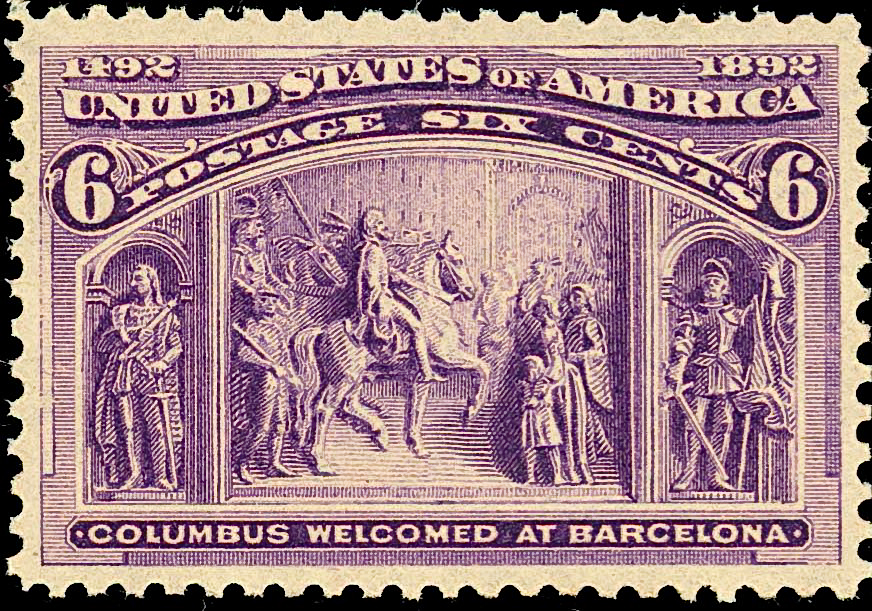
The 6¢ Columbian, purple

During 1857, Randolph Rogers was commissioned to produce a number of door panels depicting Columbus's voyages, to be hung at the United States Capitol building. The 6-cent value in the Columbian Issue, "Columbus Welcomed at Barcelona", was taken from one of those door panels, the seventh of Rogers's chronology. The framing figure on the left is King Ferdinand of Spain. The one on the right is Vasco Núñez de Balboa, a Spanish explorer inspired by Columbus's return. Robert Savage was the engraver for the printed design.

Slight variations are known in the purple color of this stamp. The most dramatic, a color called red violet, is considered significant enough to be given a minor number listing by Scott. However, this variation is not considered to be an error like the 4-cent blue and so does not command substantial premiums.

== 8¢ stamp ==
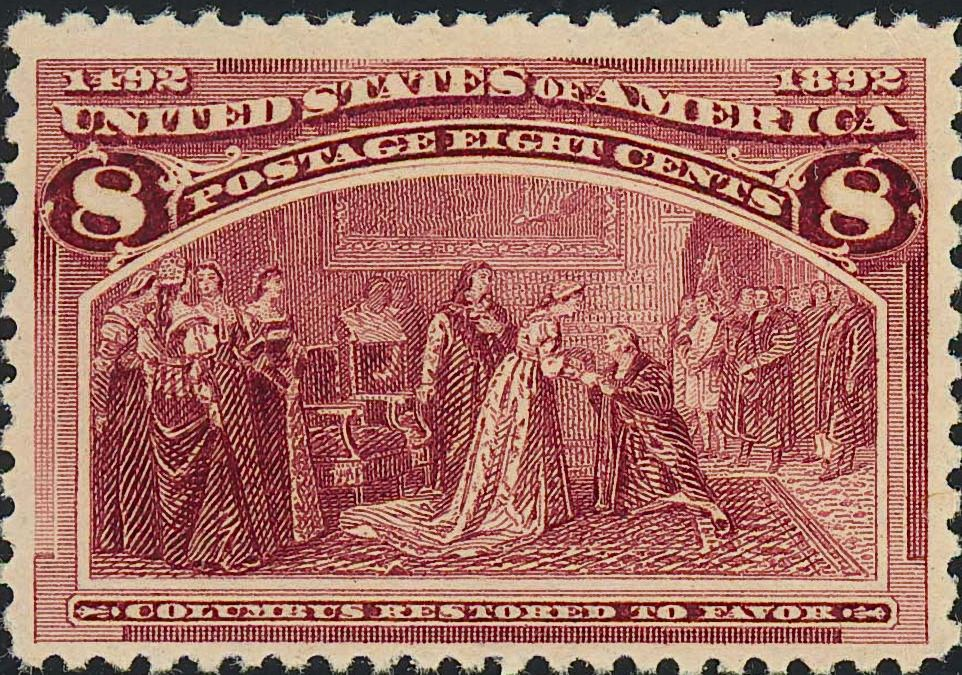
The 8¢ Columbian

When originally issued, there were only 15 stamps in the Columbian Issue. However, when the fee for registered mail was lowered on January 1, 1893, it necessitated the introduction of 8-cent stamps. A design was prepared based on a painting by Francisco Jover y Casanova, and this stamp, titled "Columbus Restored to Favor", was added to the Columbian Issue in March.

== 10¢ stamp ==
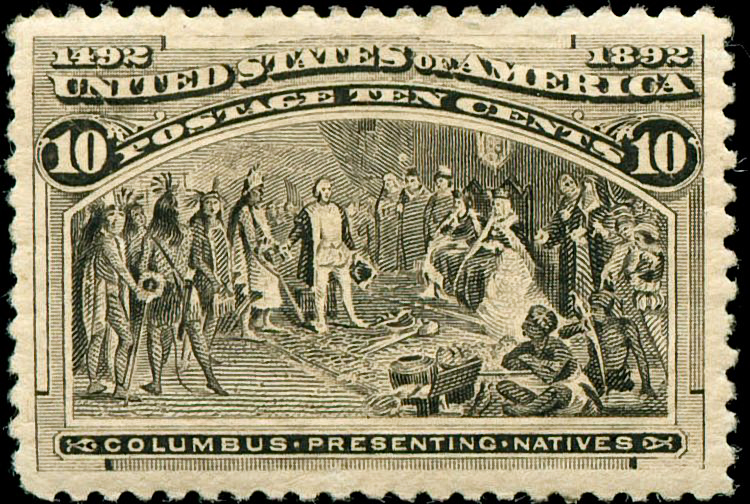
The 10¢ Columbian

The design for this stamp, "Columbus Presenting Natives", was modeled after one of the Columbus murals created by Luigi Gregori for the Main Building at the University of Notre Dame after it was rebuilt after an 1879 fire, and was one of five designs engraved by Robert Savage. This denomination was originally intended to pay the fee for registered mail. However, the change in registered mail fees that necessitated the introduction of the 8-cent Columbian also changed the most common purpose of this value; it instead paid the full postage for registered first-class mail, rather than just the additional fee.

== 15¢ stamp ==
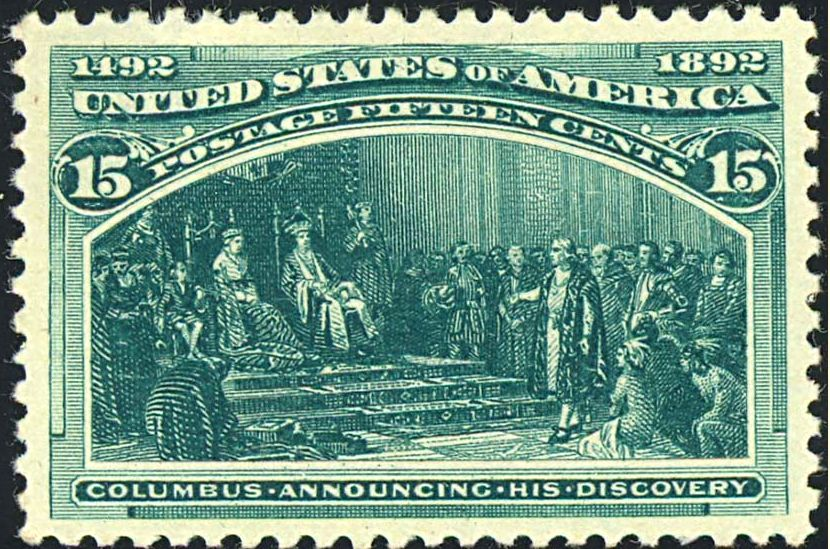
The 15¢ Columbian

"Columbus Announcing His Discovery" depicts his return to court from his first voyage. The original painting by Ricardo Baloca y Cancico is lost and is believed to have been destroyed during the Spanish Civil War. Originally intended to pay postage for international registered letters, the change in the registered mail fee left this stamp with fewer direct uses. Although it would pay the cost for a triple-rate international letter, it was most commonly used in combination with other stamps to meet more expensive heavyweight charges.

== 30¢ stamp ==
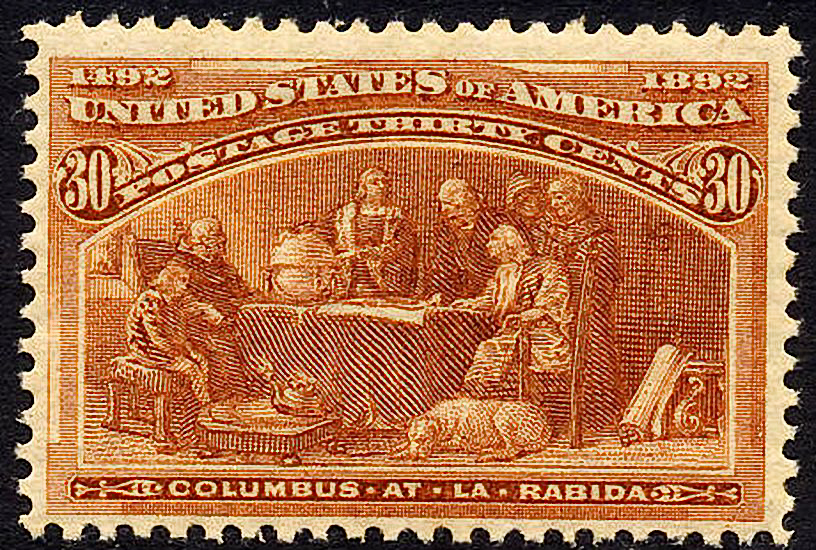
The 30¢ Columbian

The title of painter Felipe Maso's work, Columbus before the Franciscans at La Rabida was shortened to "Columbus at La Rabida" when it was adapted for use in the Columbian Issue. This value was most commonly used to pay for mail to expensive foreign destinations.

== 50¢ stamp ==
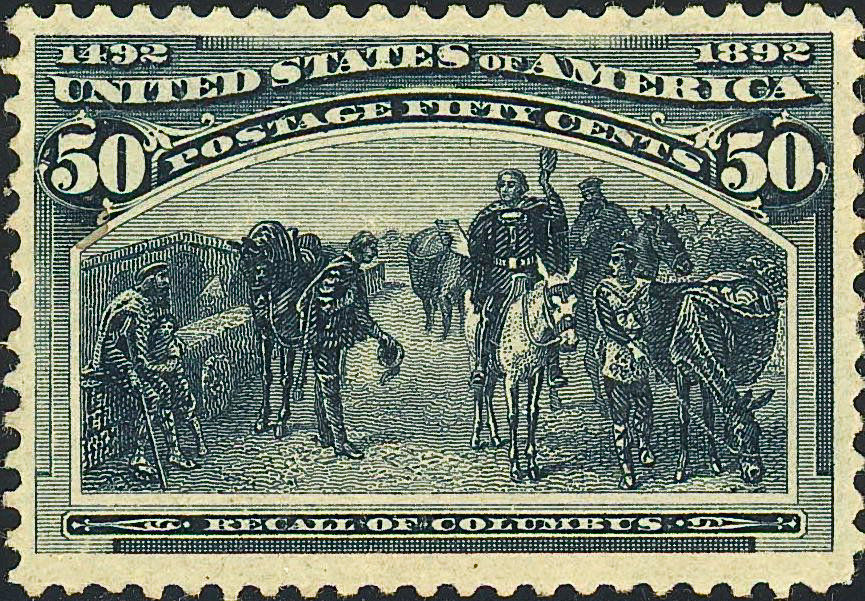
The 50¢ Columbian

A painting by A. G. Heaton was the basis for "Recall of Columbus", the first 50-cent stamp issued by the United States. Like all high-value Columbians, it was primarily used in combination to meet the needs of heavyweight or international shipments.

== $1 stamp ==
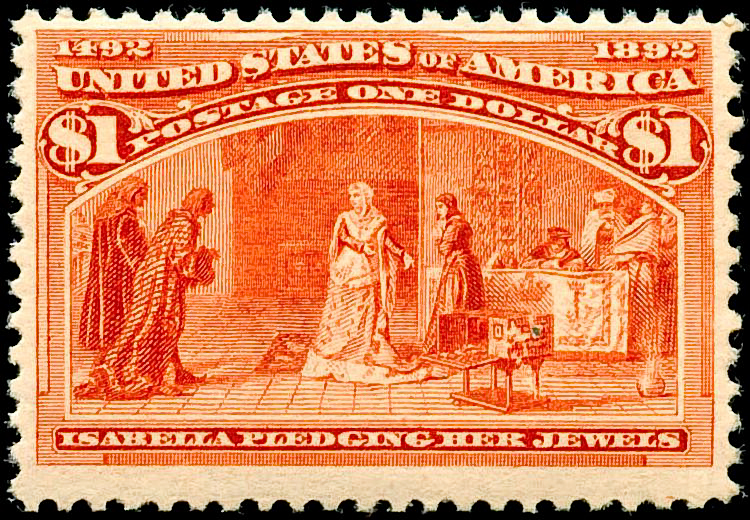
The $1 Columbian

This design was based on a painting by Antonio Muñoz Degrain, and, like many others in the Columbian Issue, engraving for this design was done by Robert Savage. Prior to the printing of "Isabella Pledging Her Jewels", no United States postage stamp, as aforesaid, had been issued with a value above 90 cents. This stamp, like all stamps equal to or greater than a dollar in value in the set, paid no specific rate at all. Although all five are known to have been used for heavy international shipments, there is speculation that they were intended primarily as Exposition advertising and as revenue for the Post Office Department. Most uses of the dollar-value Columbians were on philatelic covers.

== $2 stamp ==
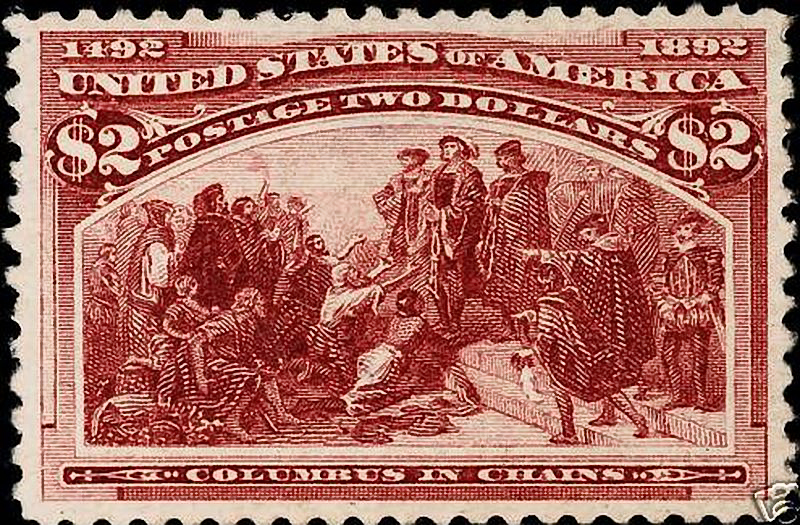
The $2 Columbian

"Columbus in Chains", its image derived from a painting by Emanuel Leutze, is one of only two stamps in the series to depict Columbus on land in the New World (along with the 2-cent). Here, he is shown facing charges of administrative misconduct after his arrest in Santo Domingo by Francisco de Bobadilla.

== $3 stamp ==
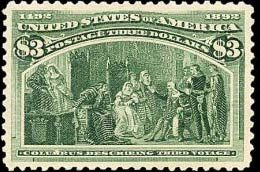
The $3 Columbian, yellow green

"Columbus Describing Third Voyage" was one of five designs engraved by Robert Savage. All of these were his sole work, engraved without collaboration with either of the other two engravers working on the Columbian Issue. Engraving was based on a painting by Francisco Jover Casanova, the same artist whose work was adapted for the 8-cent stamp's design. The three highest value Columbians were printed in much smaller quantities than less expensive members of the set, 27,650 in the case of the 3-dollar value.

As with the 6-cent Columbian, a color variety exists that is awarded minor number status. While this stamp is normally described as yellow green, the variant is considered to be olive green.

== $4 stamp ==
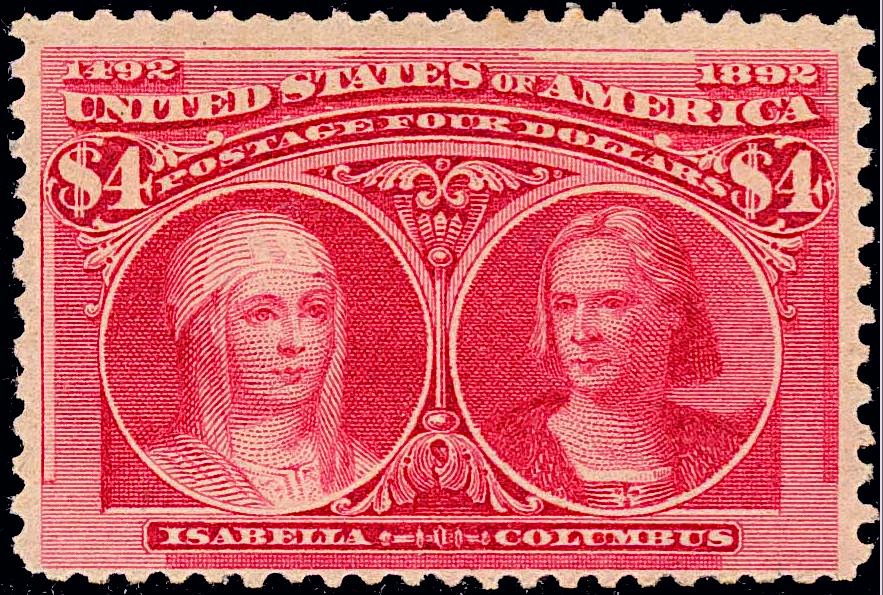
The $4 Columbian, crimson lake

"Isabella and Columbus" was the first United States stamp to bear the portrait of a woman. Queen Isabella's place on U.S. postage in that regard would not be equalled until Martha Washington was depicted on a 1902 definitive. The portrait of Columbus on the right was adapted from one by Lorenzo Lotto. Only 26,350 were printed, the least of any of the Columbians.

As with the 6-cent Columbian, a color variant exists that is awarded minor number status. While this stamp is normally described as crimson lake, the variety is considered to be rose carmine.

== $5 stamp ==
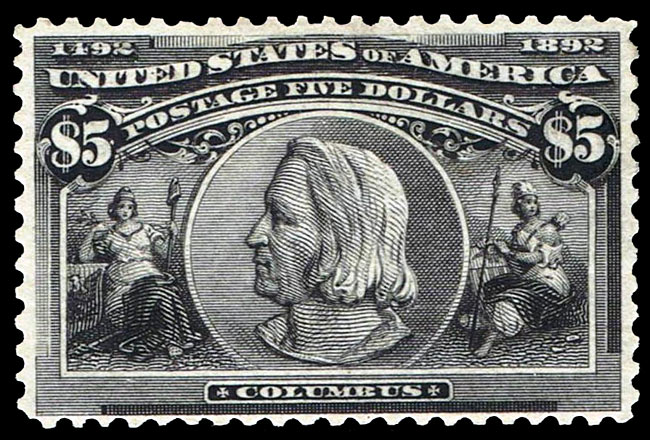
The $5 Columbian

Alfred Jones engraved the "Columbus" portrait, which faced the opposite direction from his similar engraving work on the Columbian Exposition half dollar. The two framing figures were engraved by Charles Skinner. Some 27,350 were printed, of which 21,844 sold.

== Related releases ==
=== Envelopes ===
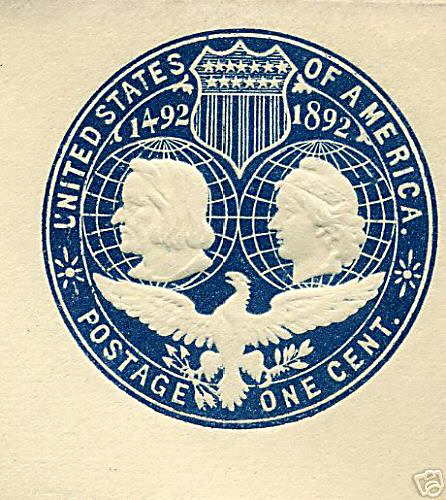
Close-up of design from 1¢ Columbian envelope

A series of four envelopes, or preprinted postal stationery, was issued along with the stamp set. This series included 1-cent, 2-cent, 5-cent, and 10-cent values depicting the heads of Columbus and Liberty.

=== Postal cards ===
A postal card was also issued to commemorate the Exposition. There were 10 different designs related to the Exposition. The cards were sold individually or as a set in a paper wrapper. One, depicting the Women's Building, is known in two slightly different versions. The preprinted stamp was not specifically designed for the Exposition, and was the same on all versions.

=== Special delivery stamp of 1893 ===
The stamps used to pay the 10-cent special delivery fee were printed in blue. There were concerns that the 1-cent Columbian, also printed in blue, might be too similar for post office employees to distinguish quickly, resulting in confusion or underpayment for services. It is not clear if this problem ever actually occurred; no covers are known using a 1-cent Columbian to pay for the special delivery charge. However, the Post Office Department issued a new special delivery stamp, colored orange, to remedy the potential problem. Although not officially part of the Columbian Issue, this stamp is sometimes referred to as the "Orange Columbian" by collectors due to its origin.

== Commemoratives commemorated ==
During 1992, in an international postal endeavor of unprecedented scope, the United States, Italy, Spain and Portugal (the four nations most closely associated with Columbus) each issued a set of six souvenir sheets on which all sixteen of the 1893 U.S. Columbian stamps were replicated. The sets of all four countries had been designed jointly and proved largely identical, differing only in details relating to language and national postal usage. The American issues reproduced the original stamps almost exactly but altered the date in the upper-right corner from 1892 to 1992.

Three stamp-images appeared on each of the sheets except for the sixth, which was devoted entirely to the original $5 Columbian. The American and Italian sets each offered sixteen perforated stamps, denominated in sixteen values. The Spanish and Portuguese sets, by contrast, included many imperforate images, for only one stamp on each sheet was perforated, and in each of these two sets, all the perforated stamps bore the same denomination: respectively, 60 Spanish pesetas and 260 Portuguese escudos (no denominations appeared on the imperforate images).

On each of the first five sheets, the overall title "The Voyages of Columbus" is followed by an individual subtitle that ostensibly characterizes the sheet's background art and the trio of the stamp-subjects included on it:

1. First sighting of Land (U.S. 1¢, 4¢, $1)
2. Claiming a New World (2¢, 3¢, $4)
3. Seeking Royal Support (5¢, 30¢, 50¢)
4. Royal Favor Restored (6¢, 8¢, $3)
5. Reporting Discoveries (10¢, 15¢, $2)

(It can not be said every stamp-image is consonant with its sheet's subtitle). The final sheet is titled simply "Christopher Columbus" and its single stamp is accompanied by text that cites the 500th anniversary of Columbus's first voyage and the upcoming 100th anniversary of the first commemorative United States Stamps.

In all four countries, these sheets were offered for sale only between May 22 and September 27, 1992.
