= Scholastic magazine =

Scholastic magazine may refer to:

- Scholastic (Notre Dame publication), student publication of the University of Notre Dame
- Scholastic Corporation, American multinational publishing, education, and media company
