= Luis de Santángel =

Spanish finance minister (d. 1498)

- Luis de Santángel, Treasurer of Aragon by Luigi Gregori, c. 1882-1884
- Born: c. 1435; Valencia, Spain
- Died: 1498; Alcalá de Henares, Spain
- Occupation: Finance Minister

Luis de Santángel (died 1498) was a third-generation converso in Spain during the late fifteenth century. Santángel worked as escribano de ración to King Ferdinand II and Queen Isabella I of Spain which left him in charge of the Royal finance. Santángel played an instrumental role in Christopher Columbus's voyage in 1492, for he managed to convince the Catholic monarchs to fund Columbus's expedition and provided a large sum of the money himself.

== Professional activity ==
In his professional life, in 1453, King John II of Aragon allowed Santángel to dedicate himself to the importation of cereals to Valencia, a product that fetched high prices during times of scarcity. Likewise, in 1475, King John II appointed him receiver of the rents and funds of the Royal Heritage in Valencia. Three years later, he began working as a courtier, a position he held until his death, being succeeded by his brother Jaime. Then, in 1479, Ferdinand II of Aragon granted him a position as an alderman at the Royal Mint of Valencia. On September 13, 1481, he was appointed escribano de ración (similar to a public notary) by King Ferdinand. Luis de Santángel was a trusted man, treasurer, and financer of Ferdinand the Catholic.

In 1476, upon the death of his father, Luis de Santángel assumed the family leadership, continuing and expanding the traditional family business activity. He is especially known for his commercial activity in salt, where he continued to lease the saltworks of La Mata (property of the Crown) and exported salt via sea routes, and sugar, a booming industry with product sourced from Valencian sugar mills (trapiches). His main partners were high-ranking merchant Genoese families or other converso families of Jewish origin. His business activities were primarily carried out in two major centers: Valencia and Seville. These merchants traded their products following the Italy-Flanders route. Additionally, he was a lessee of numerous customs duties in the Kingdom of Valencia.

Luis de Santángel also undertook numerous tasks for the Spanish Crown in Castile, where he acted as a financier for the high society. Luis de Santángel managed the funds of the ‘’Santa Hermandad’’ in Castile, alongside the Genoese Francisco Pinelo (Santángel's partner and a resident of Valencia as an agent for Genoese Bank of Saint George until 1478), which gave him extensive knowledge of the administration of the Crown of Castile. He also maintained close relations with Alfonso Sánchez and Gabriel Sánchez, treasurer of King Ferdinand and Santángel’s friend; both brothers came from a converso family of Aragonese Jewish origin. Furthermore, Santángel was part of the financial team of Friar Hernando de Talavera, confessor and personal advisor to Queen Isabella, and established an excellent personal relationship with the religious leader. In 1496, Santángel was responsible for overseeing and certifying the marriage between the king’s daughter Joanna and Philip the Handsome.

== Columbus's voyage ==
=== Funding ===
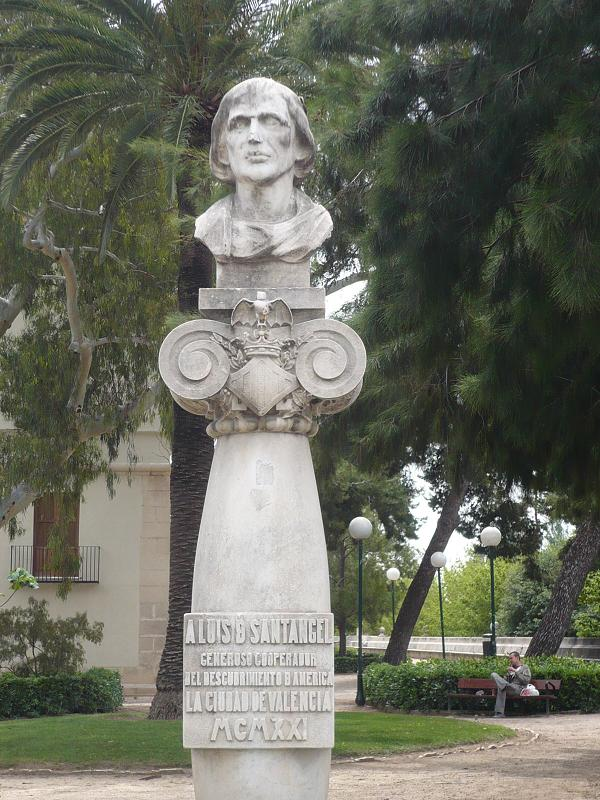
A bust of Luis de Santángel in the Alameda garden of Valencia.

In 1486, Columbus met with Ferdinand II and Isabella I to propose his plan of finding a passage to India by sailing west rather than east. While the Spanish monarchs were interested in his plans, they turned him down on the basis that they were financially tied up with fighting the Moors. To prevent Columbus from seeking out competing monarchs and nations, Ferdinand II and Isabella provided Columbus with a retainer of 12,000 maravedis (about USD $840 in modern currency) per year (a typical, respectable salary for a sailor at the time). In 1489, they provided him with documentation to obtain food and lodging in any Spanish municipality at royal expense.

Following the Spanish victory against the Moors, Columbus was called to meet with the Spanish Monarchs again on January 12, 1492, to discuss funding his voyage. Isabella was still not convinced, and Columbus left the meeting upset, confiding in Santángel that he planned to seek financial funding from France or England—whichever nation agreed first. Using his position as a royal treasurer, Santángel met with Isabella and convinced her to accept Columbus's proposal by alluding to the fame and glory that would come with Columbus's success in finding a new sea-route to the Indies. This is how his son and biographer, Ferdinand Columbus, described the meeting:

By the time January of 1492 had already begun, on the same day the Admiral departed from Santa Fe, much to the displeasure of many, including Luis de Santángel, whom we have previously mentioned, he, longing for a remedy, presented himself before the Queen. With words inspired by his desire to persuade her, and at the same time to admonish her, he said that he was greatly amazed to see that, although Her Highness had always been prompt in spirit for every grave and important matter, she now lacked the same resolve to undertake another endeavor in which little was risked, yet from which so much service to God and the exaltation of His Church could result —not to mention the immense increase and glory it could bring to her kingdoms and states. Moreover, if some other prince were to achieve what the Admiral offered, the damage to her state would be clear. In such a case, her friends and servants would rightly reprimand her, while her enemies would harshly criticize her. They would all later say that such misfortune was well deserved, causing her regret and leaving her successors to feel just sorrow.

The Queen followed his advice, she ordered Columbus to be brought back, and the Monarchs accepted his terms in the Capitulations of Santa Fe. Going a step further, Santángel arranged for the majority of the expedition's funding (without interest) by contributing much from his own pocket and additional money he had borrowed. Later, the Kings paid him back the money borrowed.

=== Columbus's first letter ===
Columbus's letter on the first voyage was addressed to Santángel.

== Jewish heritage ==
Santángel's grandfather, the Jewish Azarías Chinillo (Ginillo) converted to Christianity during the fifteenth century and changed his name to Luis de Santángel. Later, he moved from Aragon and settled in the booming city of Valencia. After this conversion, the Santángel family began to prosper economically and in status; all three Santángels served the Royal crown and possessed a large sum of wealth.

=== Spanish Inquisition ===
While the Spanish Inquisition targeted and persecuted Jews, including conversos believed to be practicing Judaism privately, Santángel and his immediate family were protected from the persecution. However, one of his relatives was burned at the stake in Saragossa. On May 30, 1497, Ferdinand II issued a royal decree that exempted Santángel, his family, and his future successors, from the Inquisition.

Despite this protection and high status, Santángel was believed to have wanted to help Jews escape their persecution by funding Columbus's journey, which would potentially offer a safer place for them to reside. After his expeditions, Columbus was granted the island of Jamaica, which became a place of refuge for many Sephardi Jews after their expulsion from Spain and Portugal. In 1525, descendants of Luis Santangel, Antonio de La Cadena Maluenda and his sister Catalina, settled in New Spain (Mexico). Antonio, born around 1490, was the royal treasurer of New Spain.

== Inspiration for By Fire, By Water ==
In April 2010, author Mitchell James Kaplan published a book titled By Fire, By Water that explored a fictitious retelling of Luis de Santángel's life during the 15th century. The novel, while not necessarily accurate, incorporated prominent events and situations such as Santángel's position in the Royal court, the Spanish Inquisition, and Columbus's journey. It discusses the impact of the Spanish Inquisition on conversos who were often still suspected when it came to religion and explores Santángel's desperate intervention towards Columbus's meetings with the Spanish Monarchs in attempt to discover a place that offers acceptance rather than terror and violence for Jews and conversos at the time.
