= Luigi Gregori =

Italian artist (1819–1896)

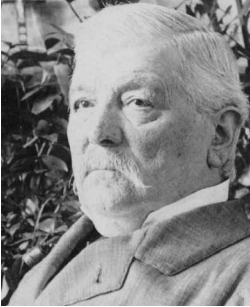
- Born: November 4, 1819; Bologna
- Died: November 4, 1896 (aged 77); Florence
- Education: Giovanni Battista Frulli, Tommaso Minardi
- Known for: Painting
- Notable work: Columbus murals (1881–1884)
- Movement: Purismo

Luigi Gregori (1819–1896) was an Italian artist who worked at the Vatican and served as artist in residence and professor at the University of Notre Dame.

== Biography ==
He was born in Bologna, Italy, in 1819, where at the age of fourteen he became apprentice of the Bolognese artist Giovanni Battista Frulli. There, he studied art of the antiquity as well as local artists, including the Carracci and Guido Reni. Frulli died in 1837, and Gregori then worked for Prince Pignatelli of Monteleone, and he traveled throughout Italy, including studying in Milan and Naples. In 1840, he moved to Rome and enrolled at the Accademia di San Luca and studied under Tommaso Minardi. Minardi was a major proponent of the Purismo movement, which rejected the popular neoclassicism and aimed to emulate Quattrocento artists such as Fra Angelico and Pietro Perugino. Minardi and Purismo as a whole influenced Gregori greatly, and he intensely studied the fifteenth-century masters. Gregori was also inspired by Purismo's focus on a return to religious and devotional imagery, in contrast to increasingly secular trends.

After his training at the academy, he was hired as artist in residence at the Vatican, where he was commissioned a portrait of Pope Pius IX. However, he may have been frustrated by Pius's focus on restoring old Vatican artwork rather than creating new pieces.

In 1874 he was invited by Rev. Edward Sorin, who was visiting the papal court, to be artist in residence at the University of Notre Dame, where he stayed for seventeen years. There he produced most of his works, and decorated the Basilica of the Sacred Heart, the Main building, St. Edward's Hall and others. In 1890 he returned to Italy, where he won a golden medal for the arts. He died in Florence in 1896.

== Works ==
From 1868 to 1892 he worked in the Church of the Sacred Heart (now Basilica of the Sacred Heart) at Notre Dame, painting the nave, the transept, the ceilings and the apse with religious figures featuring mainly Jesus, Mary, Joseph, and the Saints and Doctors of the Church. From 1874 to 1877 he painted the stations of the Cross.

In late 1875, Sorin and other passengers were stranded for three weeks on the steamship L'Amerique after its shaft broke. The next January, Sorin commissioned Gregori to make a painting in gratitude for his rescue; Gregori painted a mural depicting Jesus walking on water on the back wall of the church. The artwork was painted over during renovations between 1951 and 1977, however.

In 1880 he was commissioned by Rev. Sorin to create the Columbus murals, a series of twelve murals depicting the life and voyages of the Genoese explorer Christopher Columbus inside the Main Building. The decoration of the Main Building continued in 1890 with the interior of the dome depicting Religion surrounded by Philosophy, History, Science, Fame, Music and Poetry.

Columbus Coming Ashore mural, by Luigi Gregori

His twelve murals, such as Columbus Coming Ashore, were covered in January 2019, following an announcement by the president of the Notre Dame that the action was being taken because the artworks "depict Native Americans in stereotypical submissive poses before white European explorers... ."

His painting Return of Columbus and Reception at Court from the Columbus murals was featured in the 10¢ stamp of the Columbian Issue.

Assumption Catholic Church, Chicago's first Italian-speaking church, was dedicated in 1886, and Gregori was hired to paint the altarpiece and ceiling. He also painted frescoes at St. Raphael's Cathedral in Dubuque, Iowa, the oldest Christian congregation in the state. Gregori also helped decorate the Cathedral of Saints Peter and Paul in Philadelphia, Pennsylvania, by painting Saint Francis de Sales, Saint Patrick, and Saint Vincent de Paul.

== Gallery ==
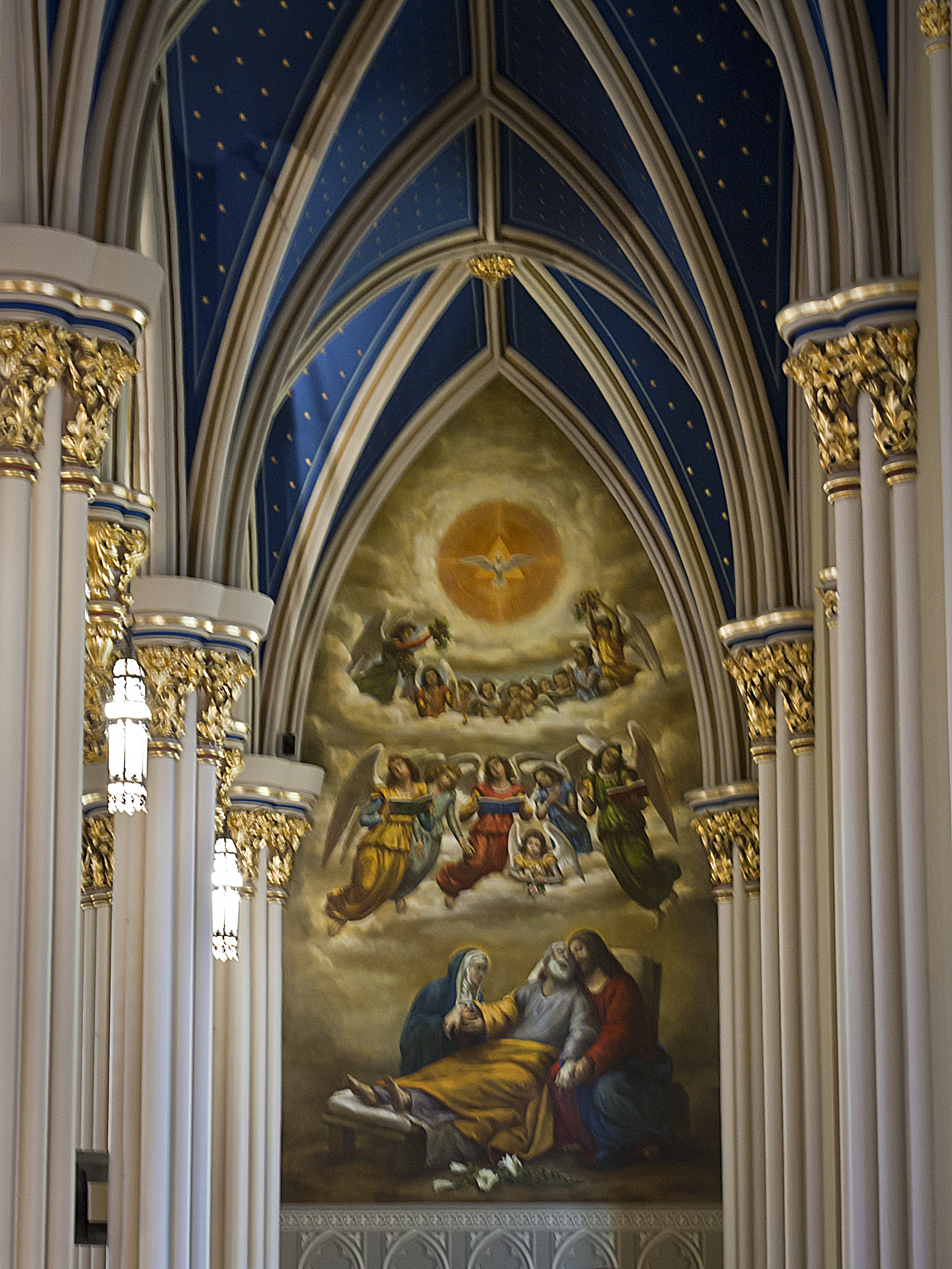
The Death of Saint Joseph, interior of the Basilica of the Sacred Heart, Notre Dame, IN.

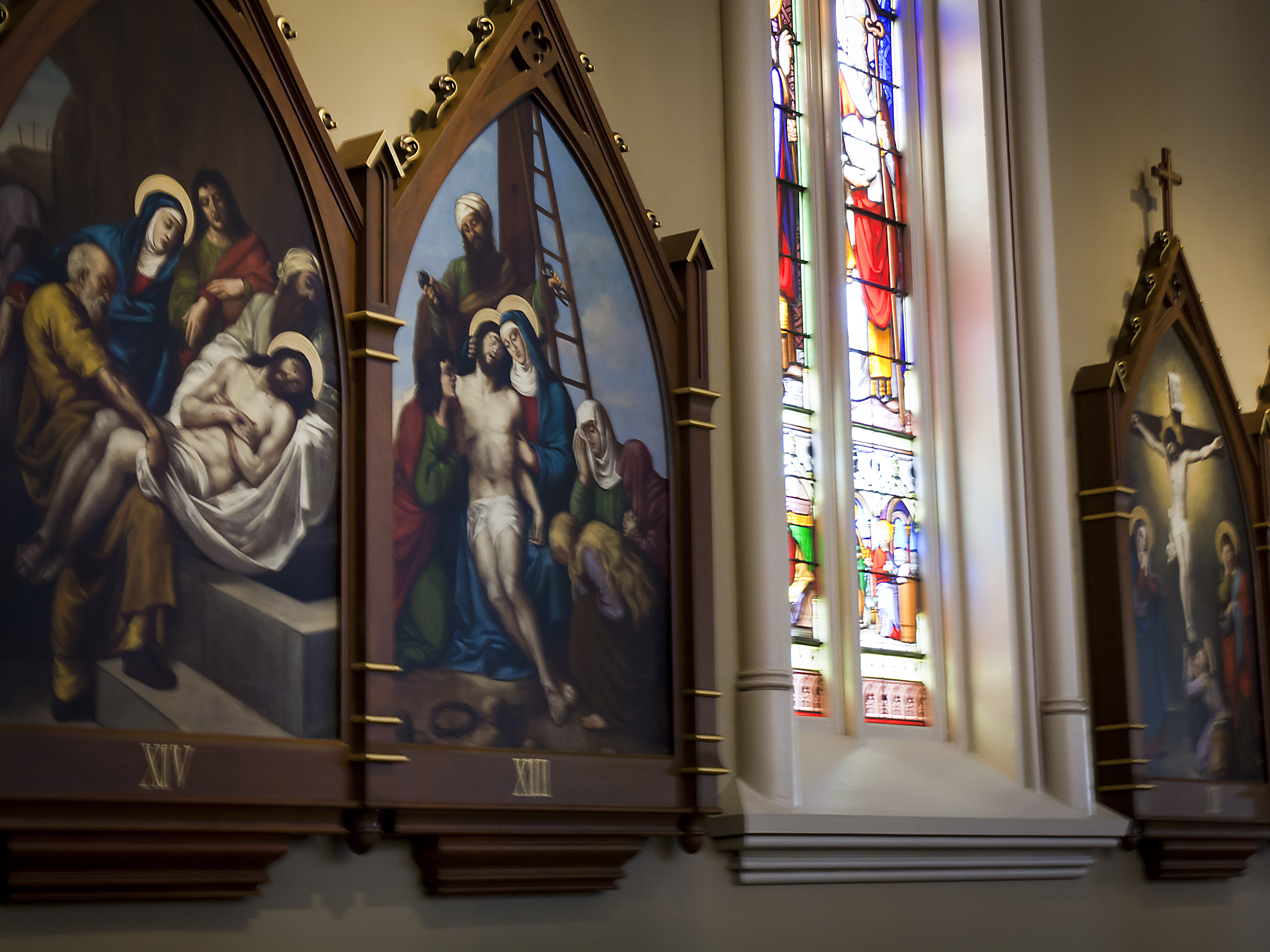
Stations of the Cross, interior of the Basilica of the Sacred Heart, Notre Dame, IN.

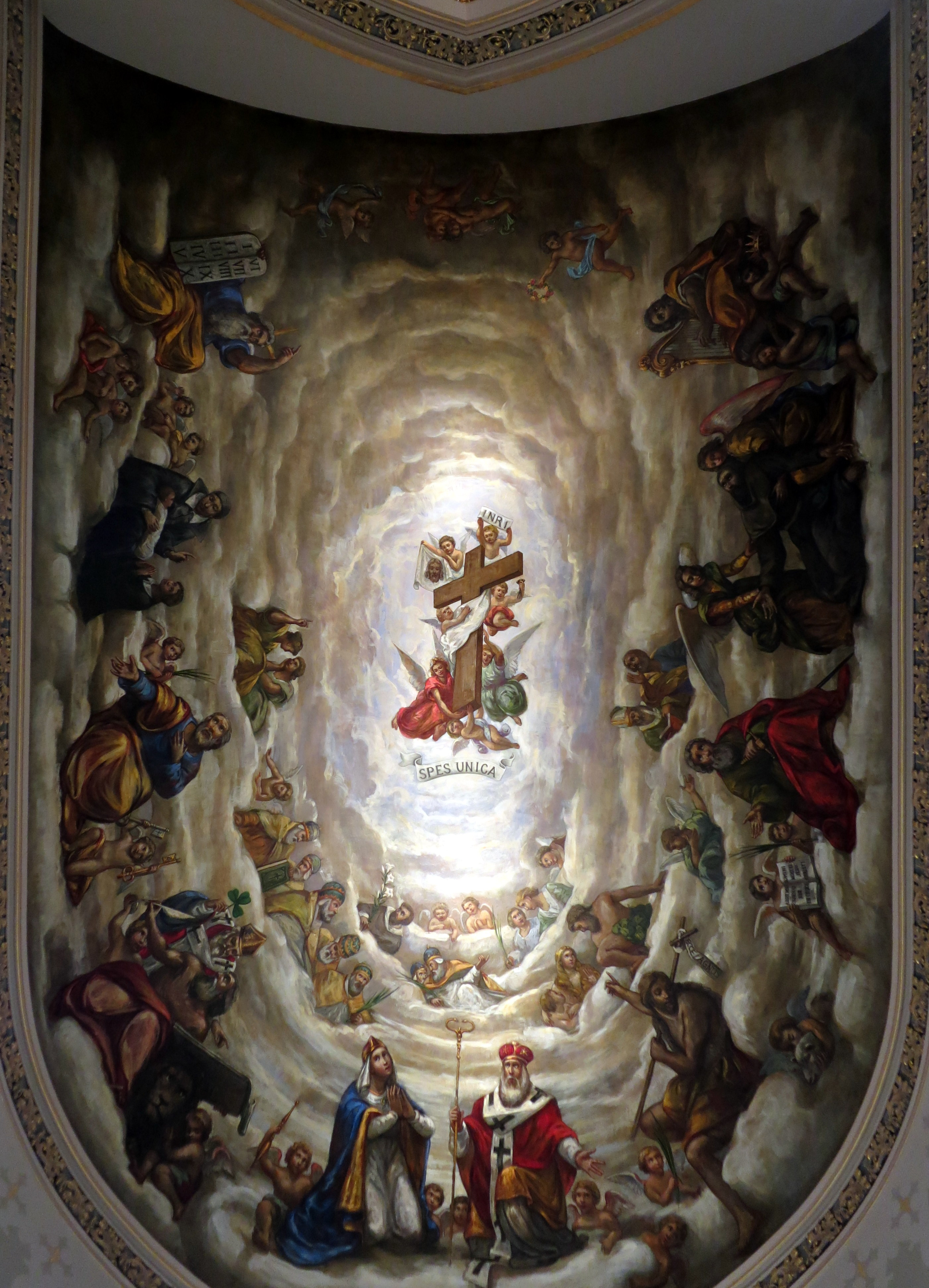
Exaltation of the Holy Cross, interior of the Basilica of the Sacred Heart, Notre Dame, IN.

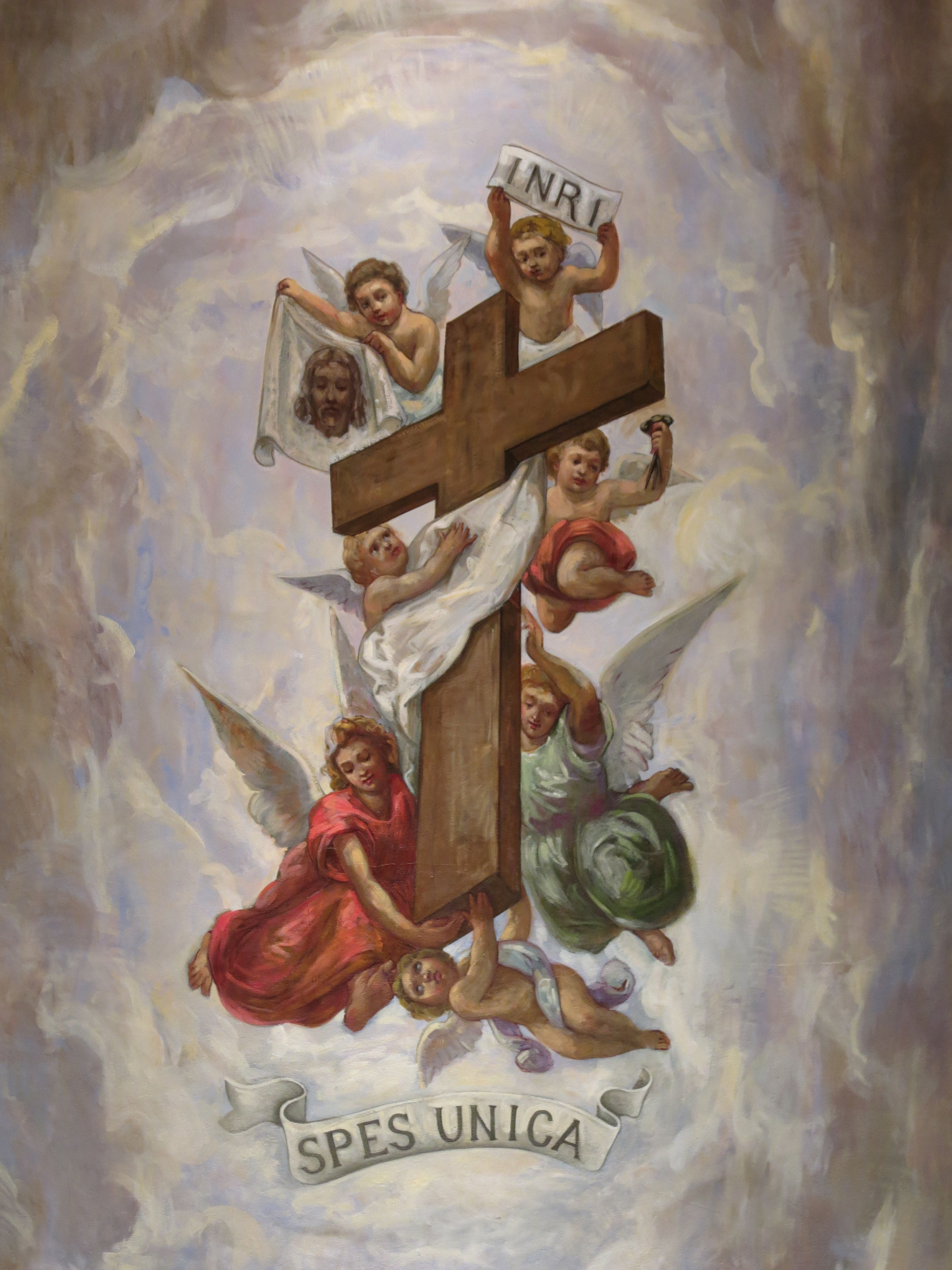
Exaltation of the Holy Cross (detail), interior of the Basilica of the Sacred Heart, Notre Dame, IN.

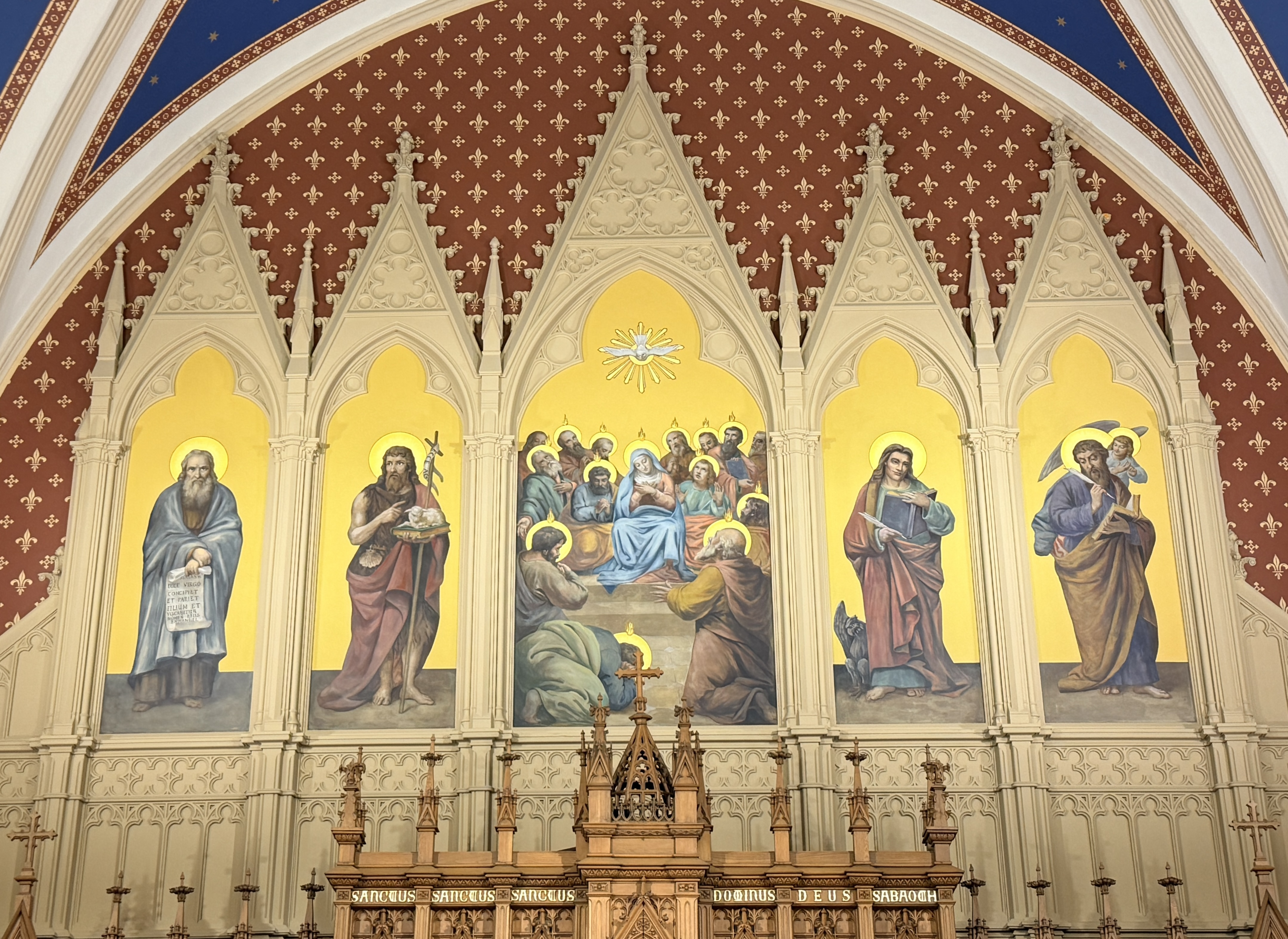
High Altar frescos, interior of St. Raphael's Cathedral, Dubuque, IA.

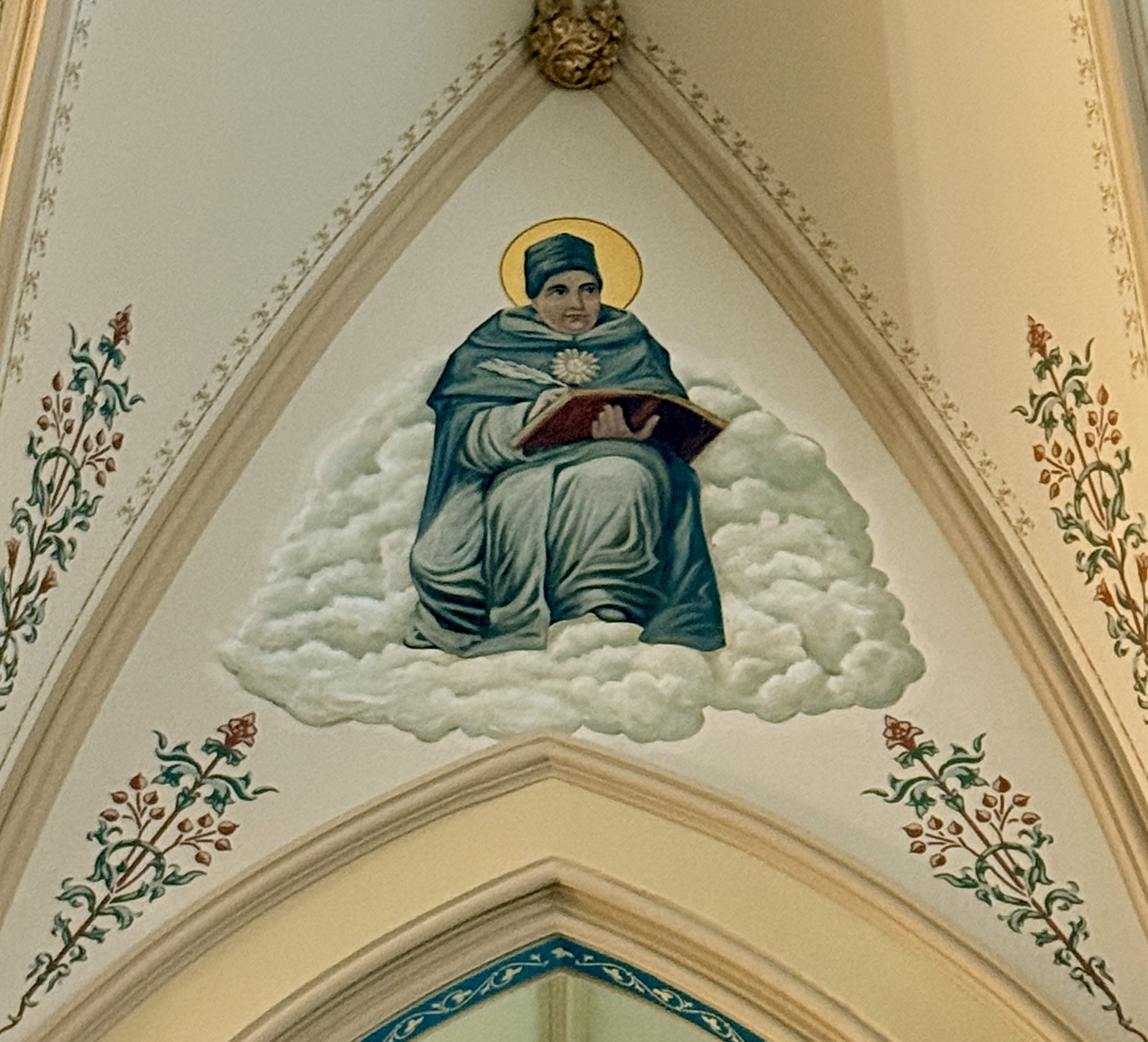
St. Thomas Aquinas, interior of St. Raphael's Cathedral, Dubuque, IA.

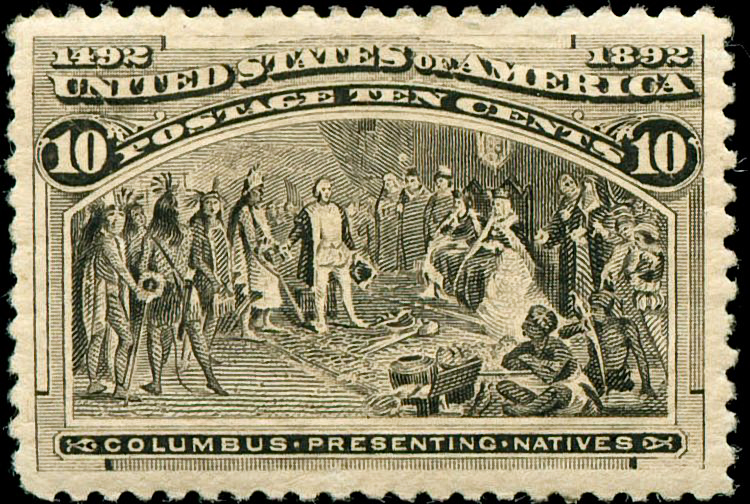
Columbus presenting Natives, from Gregori's Columbus Murals

== References and sources ==
Sources

- "Behind the Dome - home". columbusmurals.wikispaces.com.
- The Columbus Murals
