= Scholastic (Notre Dame publication) =

Notre Dame publication

Scholastic /skɒˈlæstɪk/ is the official student publication of the University of Notre Dame. Founded in 1867, it is the United States' oldest continuous college publication. Scholastic has been both Notre Dame's weekly student newspaper and now a monthly news magazine. Originally, its motto was Disce Quasi Semper Victurus, Vive Quasi Cras Moriturus ("Learn As if You Were Going to Live Forever; Live As if You Were Going to Die Tomorrow").

The transition from newspaper to magazine occurred after the inception of The Observer, an independent daily newspaper published by Notre Dame and Saint Mary's students. Scholastic is best known for its collector's edition annual Football Review, printed every February. This issue recaps the Notre Dame Football season with game summaries and in-depth commentary.

Scholastic was named "News Magazine of the Year" in Indiana for 2007 by the Indiana Collegiate Press Association (ICPA), its fifth win in seven years. In 1996 and 1997, Scholastic was the recipient of the Associated Collegiate Press' Pacemaker Award, given to the best college publication in the US.

Robert Franken, a 1969 graduate of Notre Dame, has been the staff advisor for Scholastic since 2000. He is also the advisor for Notre Dame's yearbook, the Dome, and Notre Dame's literary magazine, the Juggler.
