= Campus of the University of Notre Dame =

College campus in Notre Dame, Indiana, US

Coordinates: 41°41′59″N 86°14′13″W

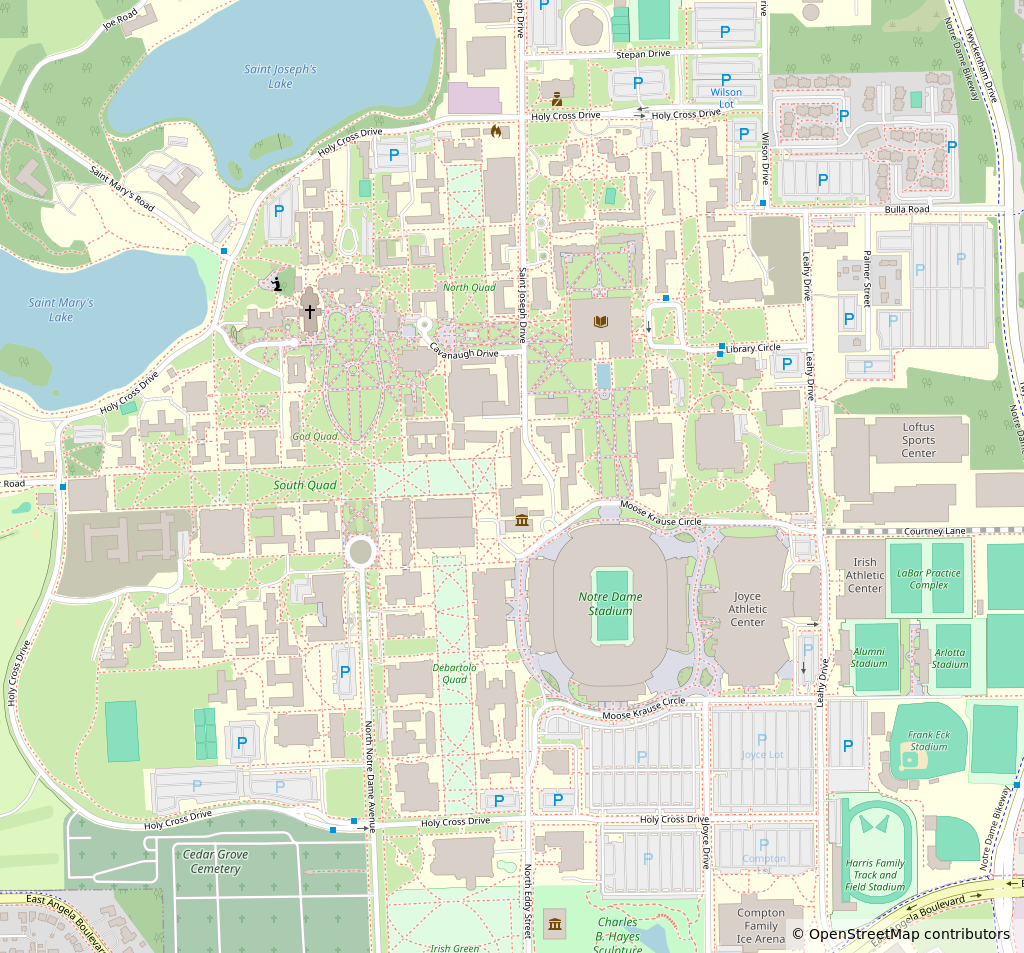
Map of the campus

The campus of the University of Notre Dame is located in Notre Dame, Indiana, and spans 1,250 acres (510 ha) comprising around 190 buildings. It is particularly noted for the Golden Dome, the Basilica and its stained glass windows, the quads and the greenery, the Grotto, Touchdown Jesus, its collegiate Gothic architecture, and its statues and museums. Notre Dame is a major tourist attraction in northern Indiana; in the 2015–2016 academic year, more than 1.8 million visitors, almost half of whom were from outside of St. Joseph County, visited the campus.

When the university was founded in 1842, the only building on site was the Log Chapel, which had been built in 1831. Under the guidance of the founder and first president Edward Sorin, Old College and the first church and main building were built. The second main building, which constituted almost the entirety of the university facilities, burnt down in 1879, and was followed by the current Main Building. The campus has continued to grow ever since. The architectural style of the first building was an eclectic mix of 19th French and Victorian architecture, with collegiate gothic taking over at the beginning of the 20th century with architects such as Kervick and Fagan and Maginnis & Walsh. The latter half of the 20th century saw the use of modernist designs, but since the mid-1990s, the university recommitted to the gothic architecture keeping the specific materials and forms of the older parts of campus. Many of the older structures were placed in 1973 on the National Register of Historic Places.

The center of campus is the Main Quad, often called the God Quad, which hosts the Main Building and the Basilica, and other important buildings and residence halls. The North-West area of campus is mainly dedicated to residential buildings, the Central-East portion of campus is dedicated to academic spaces, while the South-East is dedicated to athletics. Apart from the Main Quad, there are seven additional quadrangles: North Quad, Mod Quad, and West Quad (mainly residential), South Quad, East Quad, and Bond Quad (mixed residential and academic), and DeBartolo Quad (only academic).

== Surroundings ==
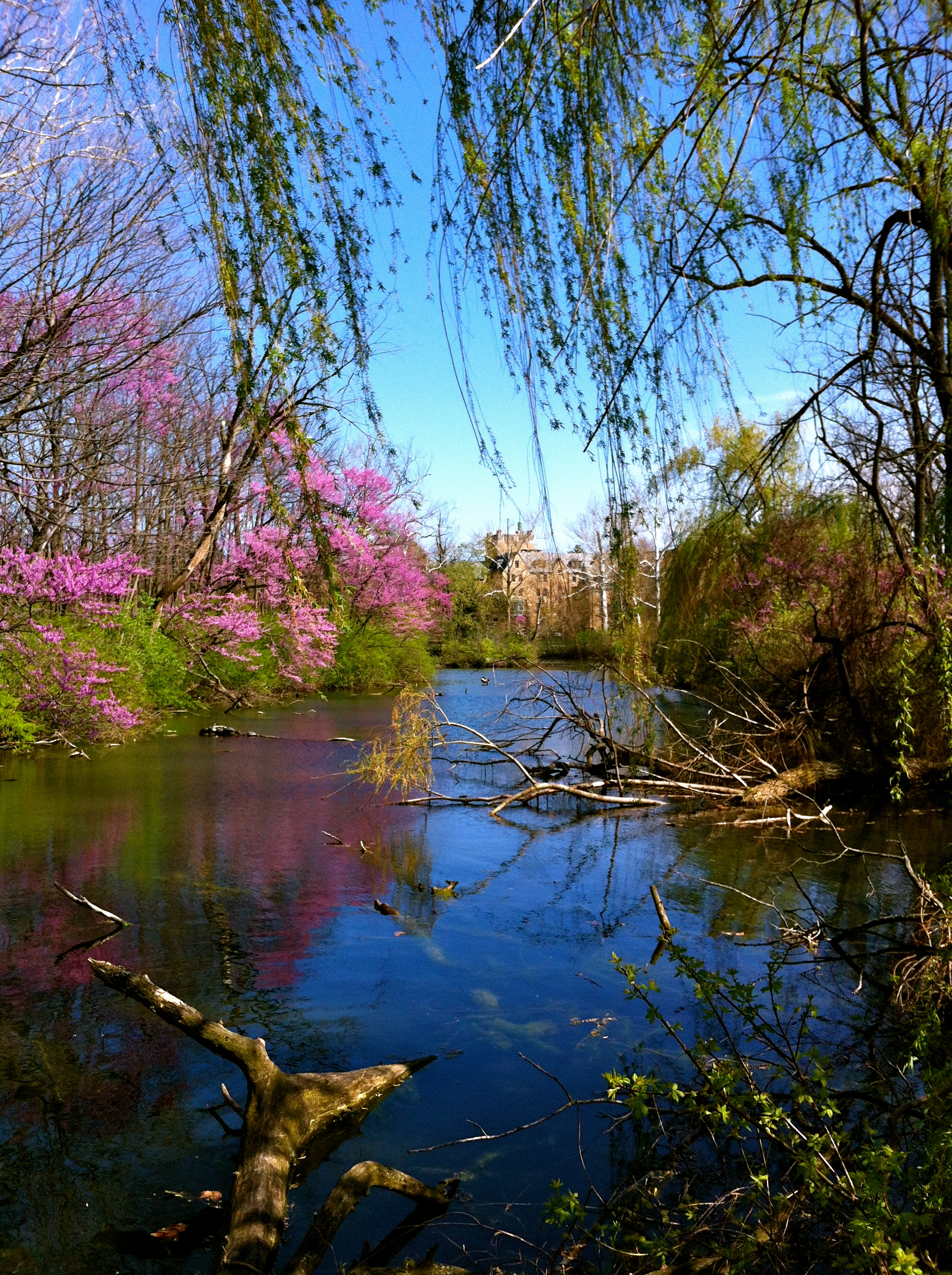
St. Mary's lake in the spring

The University of Notre Dame is mostly located in Notre Dame, Indiana, a census designated place in St. Joseph County, near South Bend and Mishawaka, in the Michiana region. Pieces of the university property are in the South Bend city limits. The university is 5 miles (8.0 km) south of the Indiana-Michigan border, and it is served by exit 77 of the Indiana Toll Road, which is concurrent with Interstate 90 and Interstate 80.

The campus has two lakes, which provide its name (Notre Dame du lac meaning "Our Lady of the Lake"): St. Mary's Lake and St. Joseph's Lake. St. Joseph's Lake has a small beach and pier for swimming and a boating facility for student use. There have been speculations regarding the fact that the name of the university references a single lake instead of two.

=== Eddy Street Commons ===
Eddy Street Commons is a mixed-use development that opened in the summer of 2009. It hosts venues, businesses, services, and apartment complexes that make it a small college town for the university. Phase 2 of construction, a $150 million development, will include more than 400 apartments, 8,500 sq ft (790 m^{2}) of retail, a new Robinson Community Learning Center, and a new Embassy Suites hotel.

=== Cemeteries ===
The university campus is home to two cemeteries, one reserved for members of the Congregation of Holy Cross, and the other open to the general public. Cedar Grove Cemetery was established in 1843 by Rev. Edward Sorin, soon after he founded the university. Notable burials include Dave Duerson, Arthur Erich Haas, Leon Hart, Joe Kernan, Moose Krause, Ray Lemek, Ralph McInerny, Ara Parseghian, Regis Philbin, Jim Seymour, Timothy E. Howard and Lucius G. Tong

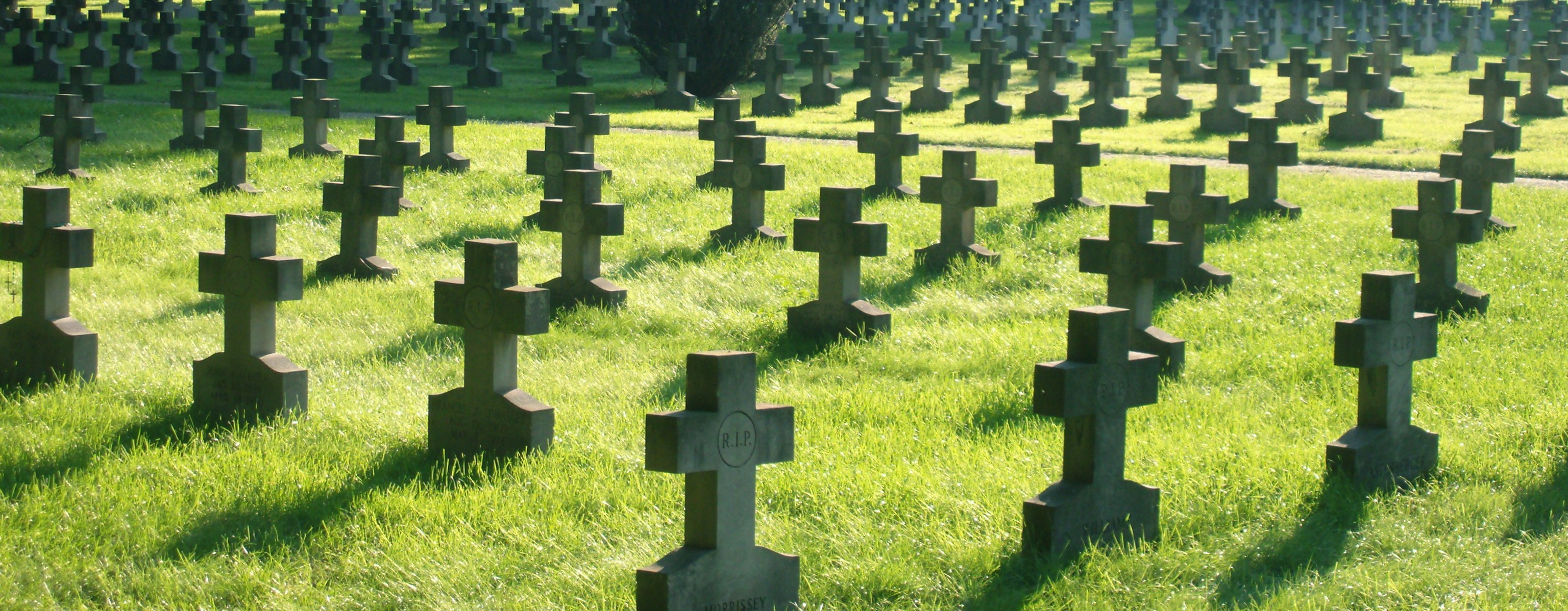
Rows of identical tombstones in the Holy Cross Cemetery

Holy Cross Cemetery is reserved for members of the Congregation of Holy Cross, which founded the university. All burials are identical and composed by a simple stone cross with the name of the deceased and dates of birth and death. Burials include Rev. Edward Sorin, Rev. William Corby, Fr. John Zahm, and Rev. Theodore Hesburgh. All but one of Notre Dame's fourteen deceased presidents are buried in the community cemetery. The exception is Cardinal John O'Hara, CSC, the order's first cardinal, who is entombed inside the Basilica of the Sacred Heart on campus. Professor Joseph Lyons, namesake of Lyons Hall, was the first case of a layman being buried there. In 1892, a monument was erected on his tomb, consisting of a granite obelisk with the words "Erected to his memory as a tribute of the affection of the old students." and "He was always the same-kind and gentle, sincere and self-sacrificing." A statue of Our Lady of Sorrows by Robert Graham is found in the mausoleum.

== Buildings ==
The Notre Dame campus is composed of around 190 buildings, divided into Quads. Main Quad is at the center, North Quad and Mod Quad are at the north, while South, West and DeBartolo Quads are in the south.

=== Administration ===
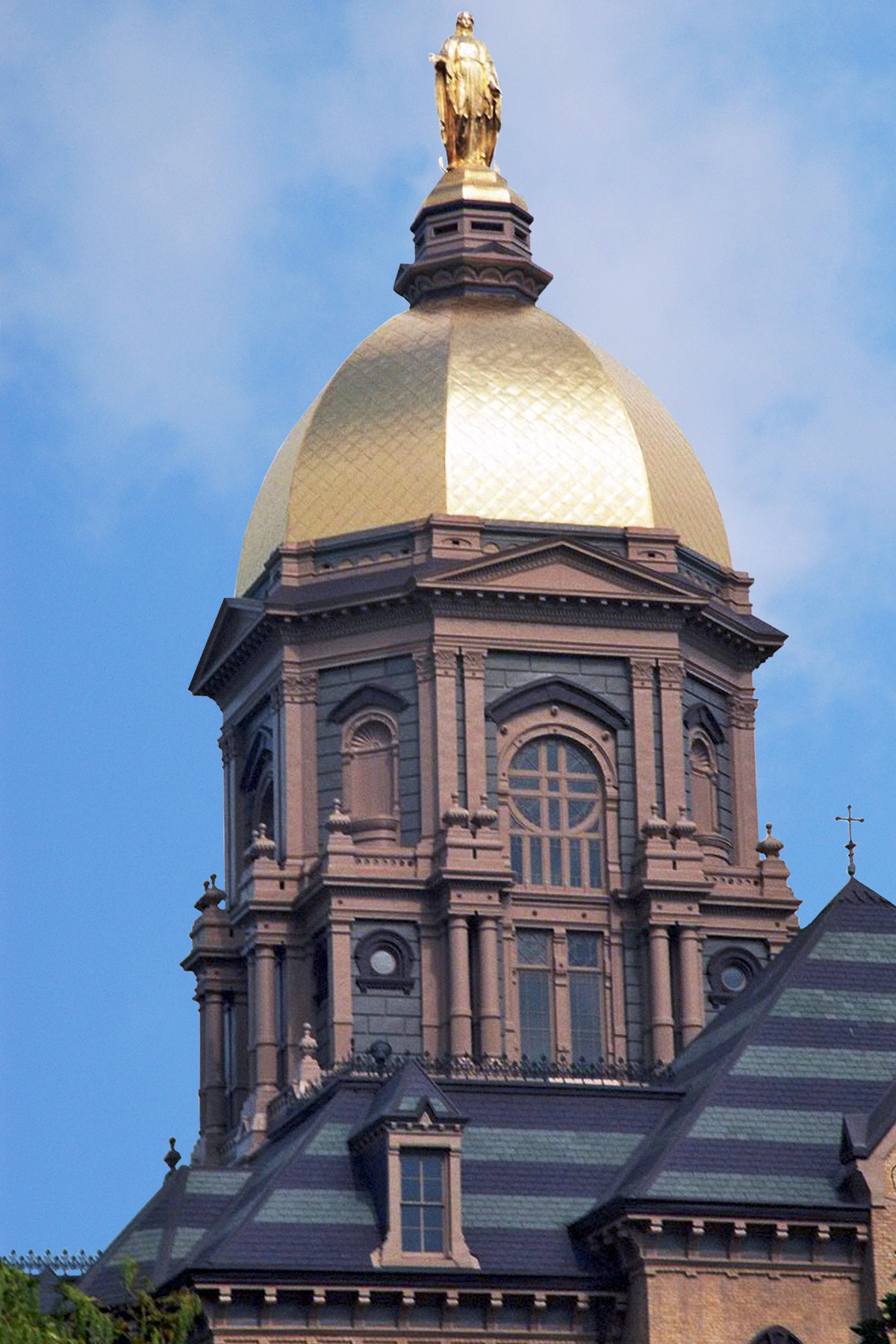
The Golden Dome atop the Main Building

The Main Building houses various offices, including the Office of the President and admissions. It was built in 1879, after the previous main building, built in 1865, was destroyed by a fire. Construction started May 17 and was finished by the start of the following academic year. The architect was the American Willoughby J. Edbrooke, principally devoted to the Romanesque style, that is reflected in the design of the building itself. Fifty-six bricklayers and 4.35 million bricks were necessary to complete it, and once finished it stood 187 feet (57 m) tall. The building also houses the Columbus murals, a group of large paintings by Italian painter and Notre Dame professor Luigi Gregori, depicting the discovery of the New World by Christopher Columbus. Gregori also painted with figures representing Religion, Philosophy, Science, History, Fame, Poetry and Music the interior of the Golden Dome, the university's most recognizable landmark. It was gilded in gold in 1886 and crowned with a 19-foot (5.8 m) tall statue of "Our Mother", the namesake of the university. The statue was designed and furnished by the female students of the nearby St. Mary's College, and it is a replica of the statue of Mary in Piazza di Spagna in Rome, erected by Pius IX.

Flanner Hall and Grace Hall are two 11-story-high buildings that were initially part of a planned complex of five high-rise buildings, yet were the only two to be actually constructed. They were male residence halls until 1997, when the residents of Grace were moved to newly created Keough and O'Neill Halls, and 1998, when the residents of Flanner were moved to Siegfried and Knott Halls. The offices housed in these two buildings include the Career Center and Card services, and many other offices of administration. Flanner Hall also houses a chapel dedicated to Saint Andre Bessette, CSC, the first saint of the Congregation of the Holy Cross. A "#1" neon sign is placed atop of Grace Hall, and lit whenever a Fighting Irish team is ranked No. 1.

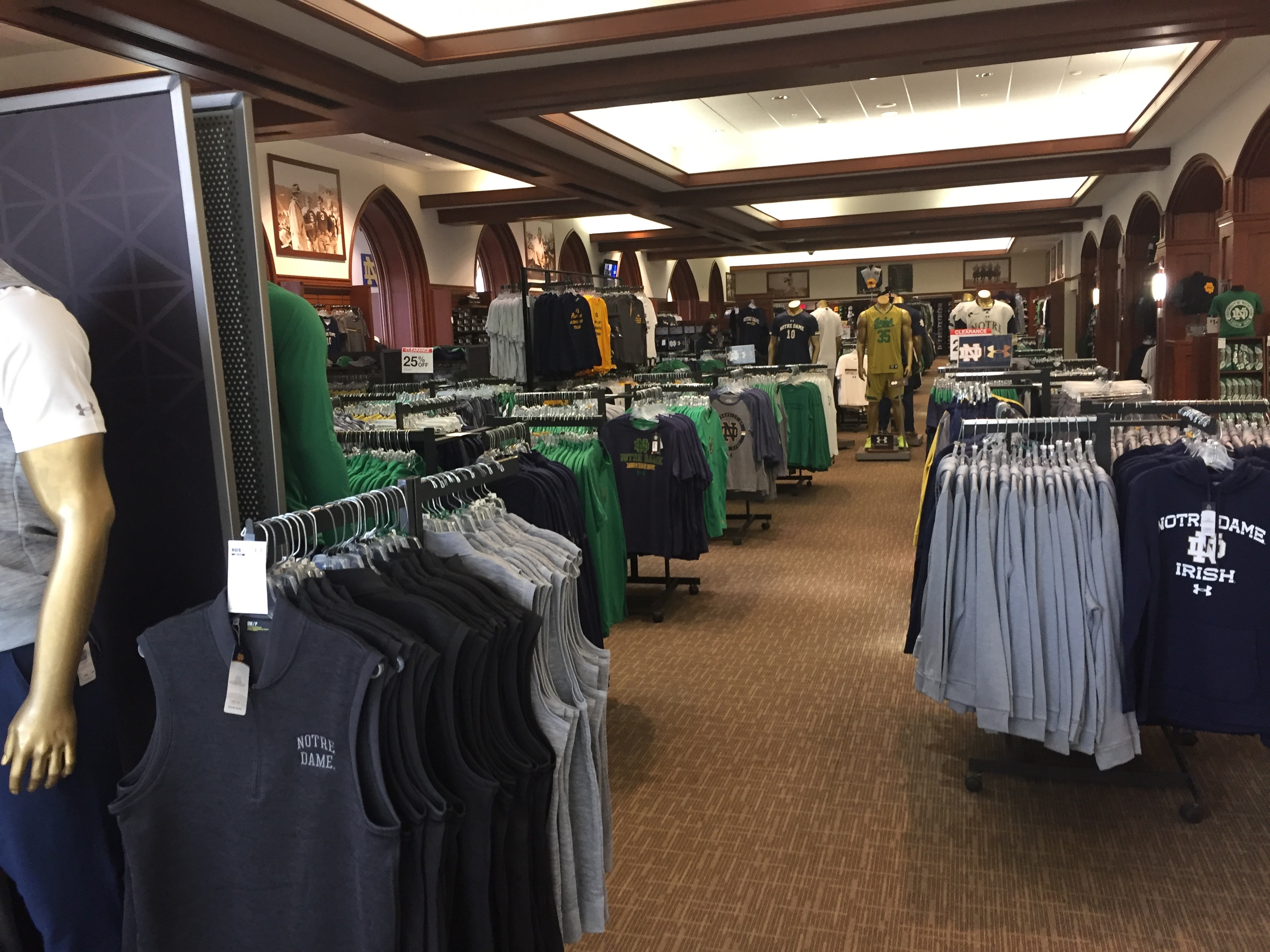
Inside of Hammes Bookstore on the campus

Located on the South Quad across from the dining hall, the Coleman-Morse Center was built in 2001 and serves mainly administrative purposes, although there are seven classrooms and prayer spaces. It includes the offices of Campus Ministry, the University Writing Program, the Center for Student Support and Care, and Academic Services for Student-Athletes. The main hall features a Kugel Fountain, which contains a 13,000 pound granite ball. It was built on the previous site of the Hammes Notre Dame Bookstore.

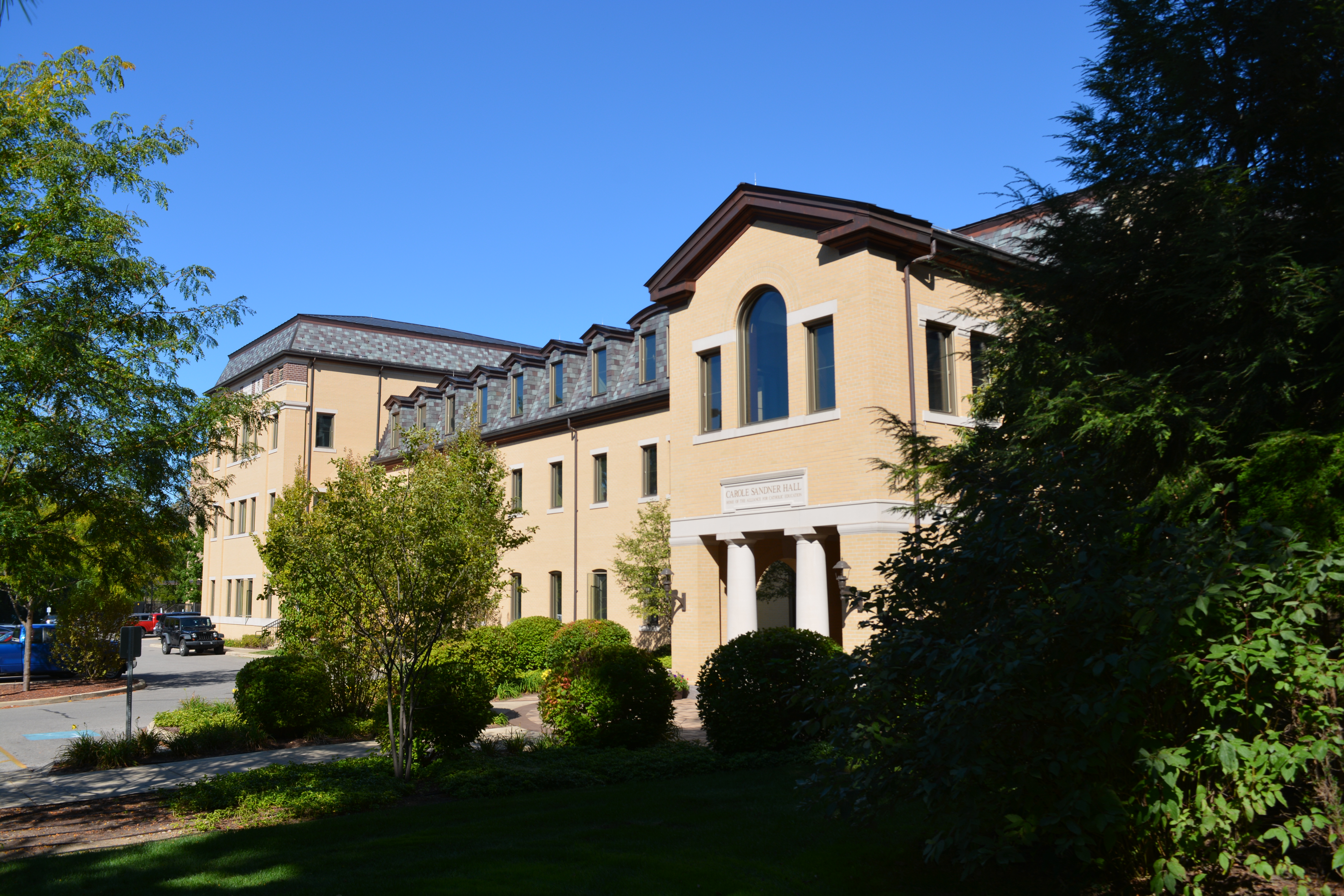
Carole Sandner Hall

Carole Sandner Hall was named after Carole Sandner, mother of seven foster children, from Lake Bluff, Illinois, after being donated as a gift from her husband. It replaces the previous convent of the Sisters of the Holy Cross. The building cost $11.5 million, and houses the Alliance for Catholic Education, a two-year service program that prepares college students to teach in under-resourced Catholic K-12 schools. The program was founded in 1993 by Fathers Timothy Scully and Sean McGraw and serves dioceses in need all over the country by providing education to lower income families. The building is environmentally friendly and was awarded the LEED Gold certification. It encloses a cloister garden that recalls the former convent of the Holy Cross novitiate.

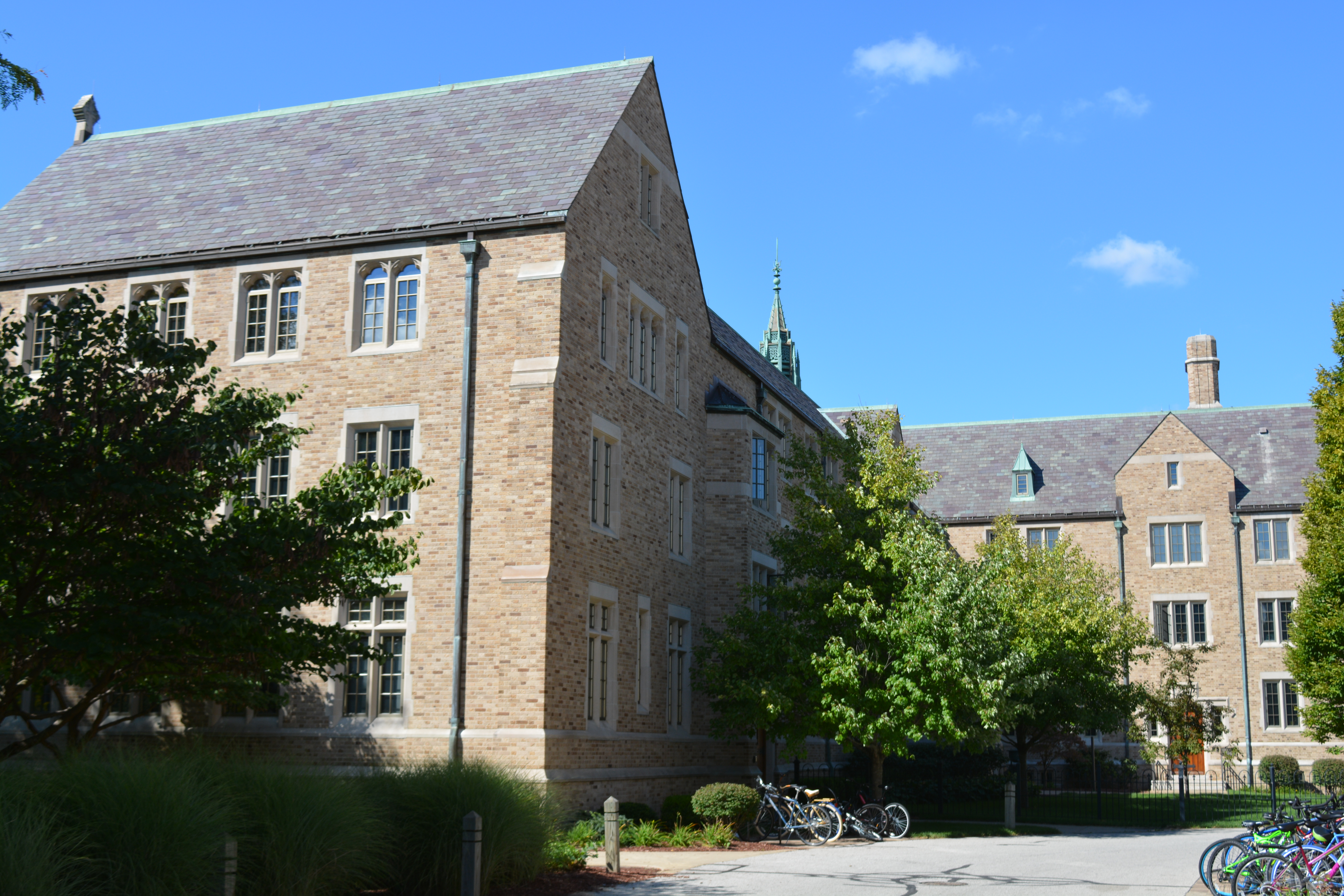
Saint Liam Hall, the University Health Services

University Health Services is hosted in Saint Liam Hall. The first University infirmary was destroyed in the great fire of 1879, and rebuilt the same year in the same spot behind Main Building. This structure survived until 1936, when it was razed to build the current structure. The present hall was built as the Notre Dame Student Infirmary in the spring of 1936, and designed by the Boston architecture firm of Maginnis and Walsh in the Collegiate-Gothic style structure. Construction started 27 May 1935 and the building was finished 14 April 1936. The infirmary, the largest of its kind in the country, contained 100 rooms, including five wards and twenty-four private rooms that could accommodate 125 patients. The Sisters of the Holy Cross and two physicians staffed the infirmary. In 2007, Mr and Mrs William K. Warren, Jr. donated $8 million to the university for the refurbishment of the health center, which was renamed Saint Liam Hall. The Warrens are prominent donors to the University of Notre Dame; the Notre Dame golf course is called the Warren Golf Course. The university stated that the building was named in honor of Mr. Warren's father, William K. Warren, Sr., (Liam is Irish for William) and his namesake Saint William of York.

=== Academic ===
DeBartolo Hall, located on the DeBartolo Quad, is an all-purpose classroom building that is so large it could fit half of the student body at one time. It doubled the university's classroom space when it was built in 1992. Its 73 rooms (consisting of 75% of the university's classroom space) range from Notre Dame's largest lecture hall, which seats 465, to small 20-seat seminar rooms and computer clusters, all equipped with interactive digital learning. It was built thanks to a donation from the DeBartolo family.

Libraries

The Hesburgh Library is the primary building of the library system of the university. The building opened on September 18, 1963, as the Memorial Library. It was named after Father Theodore Hesburgh in 1987. The library has 3.39 million volumes, the 61st largest collection among all U.S. research universities. The finished structure, which is 210 feet (64 m) tall, has a 429,780-square-foot (39,928 m^{2}) interior, which also hosts study spaces, digital learning infrastructure, rare manuscripts, library administration and several academic centers. In 2015, the university began major renovations to the library that will modernize its interior design. The library system also includes branch libraries for Architecture, Chemistry and Physics, Engineering, Law, and Mathematics, as well as information centers in the Mendoza College of Business, the Kellogg Institute for International Studies, the Joan B. Kroc Institute for International Peace Studies, and a slide library in O'Shaughnessy Hall.

Law School

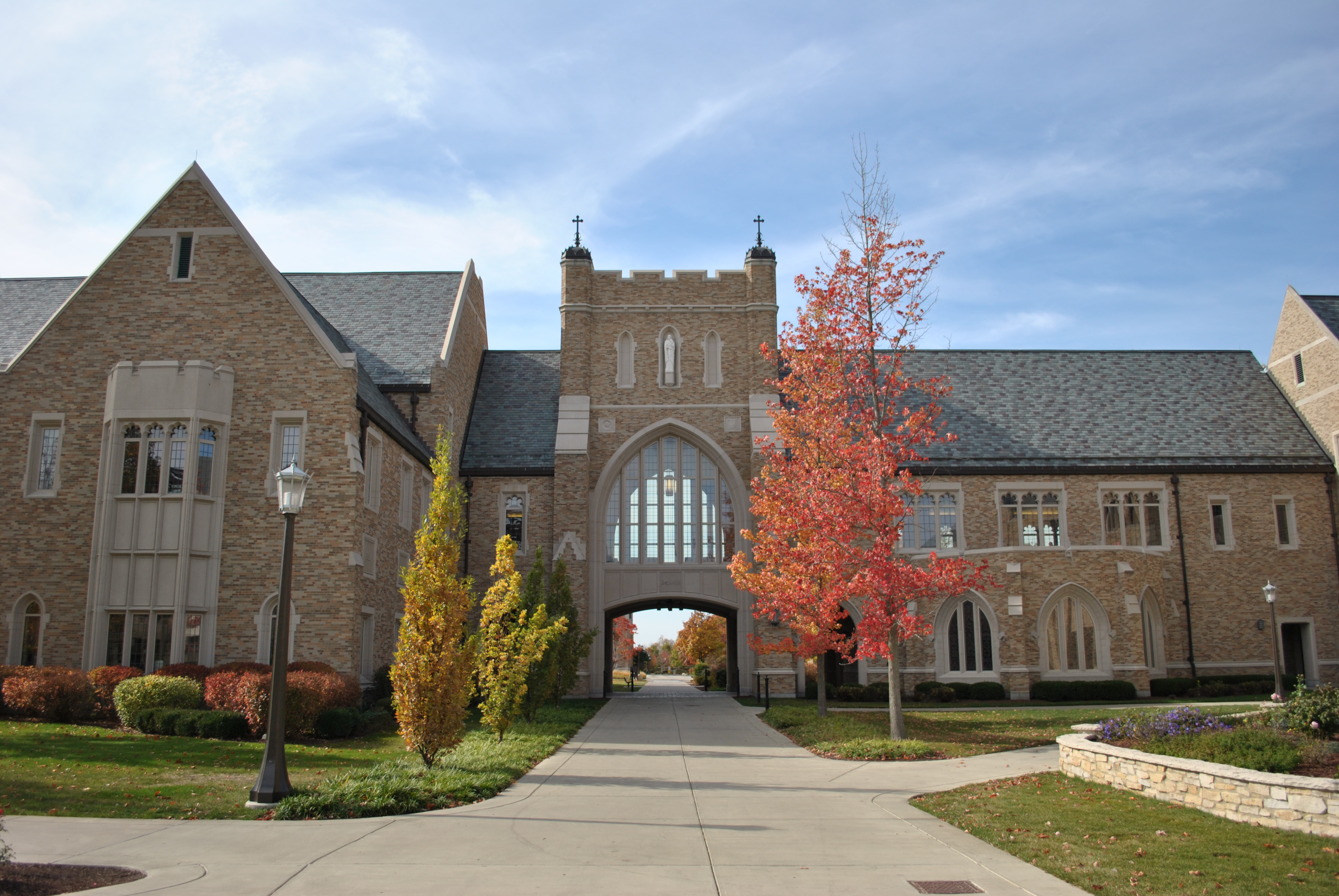
The Arch connecting Eck (on the left) and Biolchini (on the right) Halls

The first Law School building was built in 1930. In 2004, the Kresge Law Library became one of the few academic law libraries to own more than 600,000 volumes. This was accomplished mainly under the tenure of the fifth law librarian, Roger Jacobs, who also served as head librarian of the Library of the United States Supreme Court.

Between 2007 and 2008, a major expansion was added as the Eck Hall of Law, with 85,000 square feet of surface. In 2010, Robert Biolchini, an alumnus, funded the renovation of the Kresge Law Library, that was renamed Biolchini Hall of Law. The renovated Biolchini Hall has a surface of 106,500 square feet (for a total of 192,500 with Eck Hall of Law), two 50-seat classrooms, a seminar room, 29 group study rooms, and hosts 300,000 book volumes and more than 300,000 volumes in microfilm. The total cost of renovations and expansions was approximately $58 million.

Mendoza College of Business

The Mendoza College of Business main building, located on DeBartolo Quad, was built in 1996 and designed by Ellerbe Becket. Its 196,986 square feet of space includes the 300-seat Jordan Auditorium, classrooms, offices, administration, and digital spaces. The Potenziani Family Atrium features an original and refurbished NYSE trading post from 1929 that was in use until 1981.

The Stayer Center for Executive Education, built between 2011 and 2013 and located immediately south of the main Mendoza building, hosts both degree and non-degree programs aimed at executive-level MBA students and corporate clients. It is built in collegiate architecture style and was designed by Robert A.M. Stern Architects, and features stained glass windows.

College of Arts and Letters

Built in 1953, O'Shaughnessy Hall is the main center of the Notre Dame College of Arts and Letters, hosting classrooms, art galleries, a coffee shop, and administrative offices. It was built in 1953 by Ellerbe Associates in collegiate Gothic style. Its Great Hall features a crucifix by Croatian sculptor Ivan Meštrović, a bust of Dean Charles E. Sheedy, and 7 stained glass windows, representing the seven liberal arts. The Great Hall also hosts two tapestries that were rediscovered and restored in 2014 when the Hall was restored to its original appearance. One tapestry is of German or Belgian production from the 17th century, while the other one is from 18th century France. It was featured in the movie Rudy.

The Department of Art, Art History, and Design is housed in the Leo and Edna Riley Hall of Art & Design. The building, which built in 1917 as a chemistry hall, was renovated in 1982 thanks to a donation from Allan Riley, a real estate investor and 1957 graduate. The department also houses its graphic and industrial design programs in the recently renovated West Lake Hall.

The Departments of Philosophy and Theology are housed in Malloy Hall.

College of Engineering

Cushing Hall was built in 1933 thanks to a donation from John F. Cushing, president of the Great Lakes Dredge and Dock Company. Cushing graduated in 1906 with an engineering degree, but had almost dropped out due to financial reasons. President Andrew Morrissey forgave his tuition and in recognition for his kindness, Cushing later donated the $300,000 needed for the new building. The hall was designed by Kervick and Fagan in collegiate Gothic style, and its exterior is decorated with the names of great scientists and engineers on the outside, and with engineering themed mosaics and frescoes on the inside.

In 1977, Fitzpatrick Hall was built directly south of Cushing. Built by Ellerbe Associates, it was financed thanks to Edward B. Fitzpatrick, a New York construction executive and 1954 civil engineering graduate. Fitzpatrick's 184,960 square-feet were added to Cushing Hall's 104,898 square feet, more than doubling the school's space. Today, with its high-tech laboratories, Fitzpatrick Hall is the primary research, teaching, and computer center for the college, while Cushing is primarily used for office space.

Stinson-Remick Hall of Engineering, built in 2009, is a $70 million and 160,000-square-foot building that hosts some of the most advanced facilities of the college. These include a nanotechnology research center, which include an 8,500-square-foot semiconductor processing and device fabrication cleanroom, which features industry-grade tools for production of integrated circuits and medical devices with nanometer-sized features.

The Hessert Laboratory for Aerospace Research and Hessert Laboratory at White Field offer a combined 84,000-square-feet of research space for aerospace research. Combined, they house 19 major high-speed wind tunnels to provide near-flight conditions for research related to innovations in flight and flight speed, jet engines fuel-efficiency, and other projects for commercial use, national defense, and space exploration. Hessert houses the facilities of the Institute for Flow Physics and Control (FlowPAC), one of the world's largest research projects focused on fluid mechanics. Other facilities are also dedicated to aero-acoustics, aero-optics, multiphase flow, fluid-structure interaction, general flow control, hypersonics, gas-turbine propulsion, wind energy, and sensor and flow actuator development.

Bond Hall

Originally built in 1917 as the University Library, Bond Hall is the home of the Notre Dame School of Architecture. It is the only building built in Renaissance style, and one of the two building in stone.

=== Religious ===
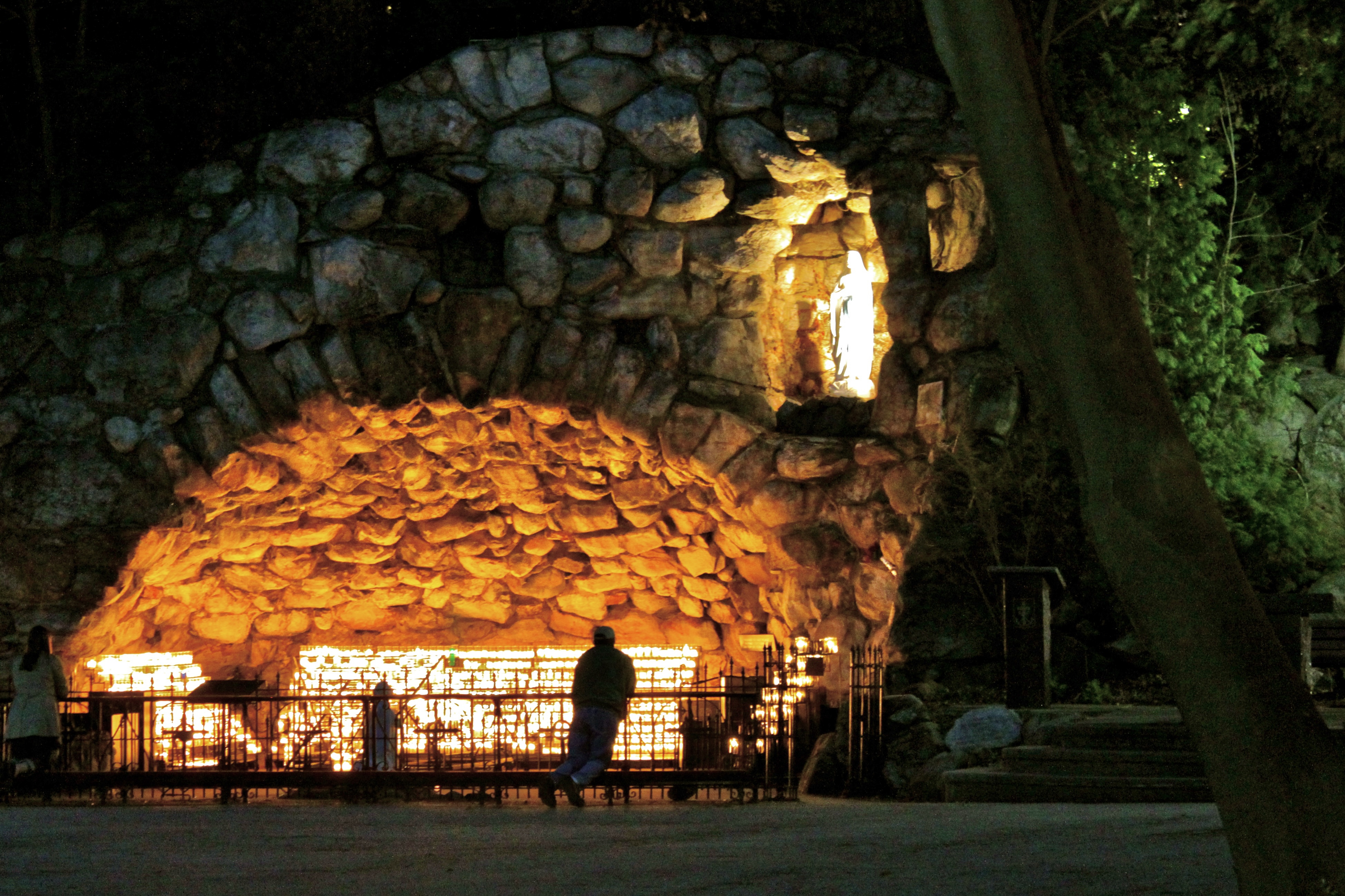
The Grotto

At Notre Dame, chapels are found in a number of academic buildings and in every residence hall. There are 57 chapels on campus, including the Basilica of the Sacred Heart.

Originally known as Sacred Heart Parish, the Basilica of the Sacred Heart also serves as the mother church for the Congregation of Holy Cross in the United States. The neo-Gothic church has 44 large stained glass windows and murals completed over a 17-year period by the Vatican painter Luigi Gregori. The Basilica bell tower is 218 feet (66 m) high, making it the tallest university chapel in America.

Built in 1896, the Grotto is the reproduction of the Grotto of Our Lady of Lourdes. It includes a section of rock directly from the Grotto in France.

=== Residential halls ===
There are currently 33 undergraduate residence halls at the University of Notre Dame. Each residence hall is single sex, with 17 all-male residence halls, 15 all-female residence halls, and one used while other dorms are being refurbished. All first-year students are not only guaranteed on-campus housing, but are required to reside on-campus for three years. Many of the halls were inserted in 1973 on the National Register of Historic Places. Notre Dame has a unique undergraduate hall system, where students rarely switch dorms and each dorms builds its own spirit, tradition, mascot, sport teams, events, dances and reputation. Approximately 80% of undergraduate students live on-campus, and generally, a student usually resides in the same dorm for the entirety of their undergraduate career. A huge segment of student life happens though residence halls and students develop a particular attachment to their undergraduate hall. Each residence hall is directed by one Rector with the assistance of two Assistant Rectors and a variable number of Resident Assistants (from 4 to 9). Every residence hall has a chapel where Mass is held, fields a variety of intramural sports teams, elects one senator to represent the dorm in Student Government, and elects co-presidents which work through the Hall Presidents Council (HPC) student organization.

=== Museums ===
The Snite Museum of Art was a fine art museum on the University of Notre Dame campus. It owned over 23,000 works which represent many principal world cultures and periods, with a focus on Western art history. The museum was home to the Kress collection of Italian renaissance and baroque art, as well as an extensive Mesoamerican collection. According to the website, ..."the museum now exhibits the most important collection of Olmec art in any art museum in the United States. The Unruh purchase reinforces the Museum's position as one of the most important general pre-Columbian collections in this country."

The Raclin Murphy Museum of Art opened in December 2023 and now houses the collection that previously resided at Snite, which closed in 2023.

=== Recreational facilities ===
==== Washington Hall ====
LaFortune Student Center

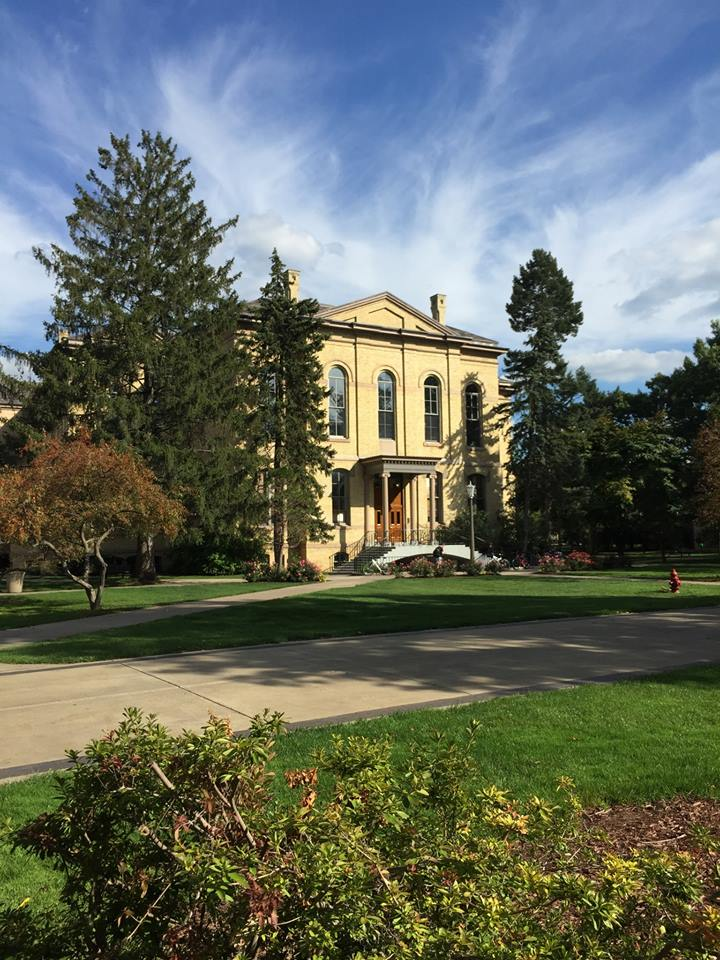
LaFortune Student Center

A Science Hall was built in 1883 under the direction of Fr. Zahm, but in 1950, it was converted to a student union building and named LaFortune Center, after Joseph Aloysius LaFortune, an oil executive from Tulsa, Oklahoma. Commonly known as "LaFortune" or "LaFun," it is a 4-story building of 83,000 square feet that provides the Notre Dame community with a meeting place for social, recreational, cultural, and educational activities. LaFortune employs 35 part-time student staff and 29 full-time non-student staff and has an annual budget of $1.2 million. Many businesses, services, and divisions of The Office of Student Affairs are found within. The building also houses restaurants from national restaurant chains.

==== Legends of Notre Dame ====
Legends of Notre Dame

Legends of Notre Dame, commonly referred to as Legends, is a music venue, public house, and restaurant located on the campus of the University of Notre Dame, just 100 yards south of Notre Dame Stadium. The former Alumni Senior Club opened its doors the first weekend in September 2003, after a $3.5 million renovation and transformed into the all-ages student hang-out that currently exists. The building's renovation increased its size by nearly 50%. This transformation was made possible largely by a gift from current Chairman of the Board of Trustees, Richard Notebart. The project was directed by Assistant Vice President for Student Activities, M. Brian Coughlin, and Vice President for Student Affairs, Rev. Mark Poorman CSC.

The Legends of Notre Dame Restaurant and Alehouse Pub is a full-service, casual dining operation which is open to the public for lunch and dinner Monday through Sunday, along with being open for breakfast on football Saturdays in the fall. All proceeds from the restaurant and alehouse pub are used to support social programming for Notre Dame students at Legends. The restaurant features 23 draught beer lines, 70 bottle beer options, a large selection of craft and micro-brews, wine and spirits, a diverse menu, a timeline of Notre Dame sports history, and 14 High-Definition plasma TVs. Executive chef Giuseppe Macerata was featured multiple times on South Bend's WSJV Fox 28 news cooking segment "Wake Up!".

The nightclub at Legends of Notre Dame is only open to Notre Dame, Saint Mary's College and Holy Cross College students and their guests. Every Thursday, Friday, and Saturday night during the academic year, the club offers free live entertainment in the form of concerts, comedy shows, nightclubs and beyond. There are six events per weekend at Legends featuring live entertainment at 10:00 pm and a nightclub at midnight, which can stay open until as late as 4:00 am. On Thursday nights, Legends hosts low-key events such as "Brew and View" midnight movies, dart tournaments, open pool play, club jazz, karaoke, speed dating, or guitar hero competitions. On Friday and Saturday nights, a danceclub begins with a DJ, intelligent lighting, and a party atmosphere. Most every nightclub is attached to a theme, or more specifically to a style of music (salsa, reggaeton, hip hop, bhangra, swing, country, etc.) Notable acts that have performed at Legends include Young Dubliners, Chicago's Plain White T's (2007), Tim Reynolds, Stroke 9, Ryan Cabrera, Sara Bareilles, Gavin DeGraw, Matt and Kim, Who's Bad Michael Jackson tribute, South Bend's Umphrey's McGee (2003), Blue October (2005), Scott Weiland (2006), Flogging Molly (2007), Gym Class Heroes (2009), Hawthorne Heights (2011), South Bend's Ted Leo and the Pharmacists (2011), Indiana's The Ataris (2013), Chicago's Jeremih (2013), Red Jumpsuit Apparatus (2013), and Michigan's BØRNS (2016).

Legends was recognized as one of the top 12 nightclub music venues in the country on February 7, 2008, at the Pollstar Music Industry Awards at the Nokia Theater in Los Angeles, California, but did not make it as a finalist. The 9:30 Club in Washington, DC took first place.

== Athletic facilities ==
The Notre Dame Stadium is an outdoor football stadium, home field of the University of Notre Dame Fighting Irish. Opened 96 years ago in 1930, the stadium seating capacity was nearly 60,000 for decades. More than 21,000 seats were added for the 1997 season, which increased the capacity to over 80,000. The playing surface was changed to FieldTurf in 2014, after 84 seasons on natural grass. The stadium is undergoing a 400 million dollars expansion project.

The Edmund P. Joyce Athletic & Convocation Center, often called the Joyce Center, is a 9,149-seat multi-purpose arena. The arena opened in 1968. It is home to the University of Notre Dame Fighting Irish basketball and volleyball teams. The main arena, Phillip J. Purcell Pavilion, is located in the southern portion of the facility. The northern portion housed a hockey rink until October 2011. It also houses the Rolfs Aquatic Center (which was added on in 1985) in the rear of the building.

The Compton Family Ice Arena is a 5,022-seat, two-rink ice facility. The arena saw its first game on October 21, 2011. The ice arena replaced the 2,857-seat rink in the north dome of the Edmund P. Joyce Center.

The Guglielmino Athletics Complex, also known as The Gug, is a recruitment, fitness, training, and athletics administration center. It was built in 2005 by McShane Construction and it 96,049 gross square feet and built with a gift from the Don F. and Flora Guglielmino. It hosts the practice locker-rooms and facilities for the football team, weight-training equipment for all student athletes, athletics administration and coach offices, meeting rooms, the Isban auditorium, and the Loftus Sports Medicine and Rehabilitation Center facilities. The Alumni Soccer Stadium is used for practice and competition for the soccer teams.

== Art and monuments ==
A statue of Knute Rockne is installed outside Notre Dame Stadium. The side of the library facing the stadium is covered a 134 feet high and 68 feet wide mural called Word of Life, and commonly known as "Touchdown Jesus". Main Quad hosts a statue of Fr. Sorin, the founder of the university. Sculpted by Ernesto Biondi in 1906. it is over 20 feet tall. it includes a Latin inscription.

The Sacred Heart of Jesus statue was sculpted by Robert Cassiani and dedicated during the 1893 commencement exercises. A statue of President Corby stands in front of Corby Hall. Corby served as chaplain of the Irish Brigade during the battle of Gettysburg. Hence, an identical statue is present at Gettysburgh. The statue is attributed the football nickname "Fair Catch Corby".

Clarke Memorial Fountain

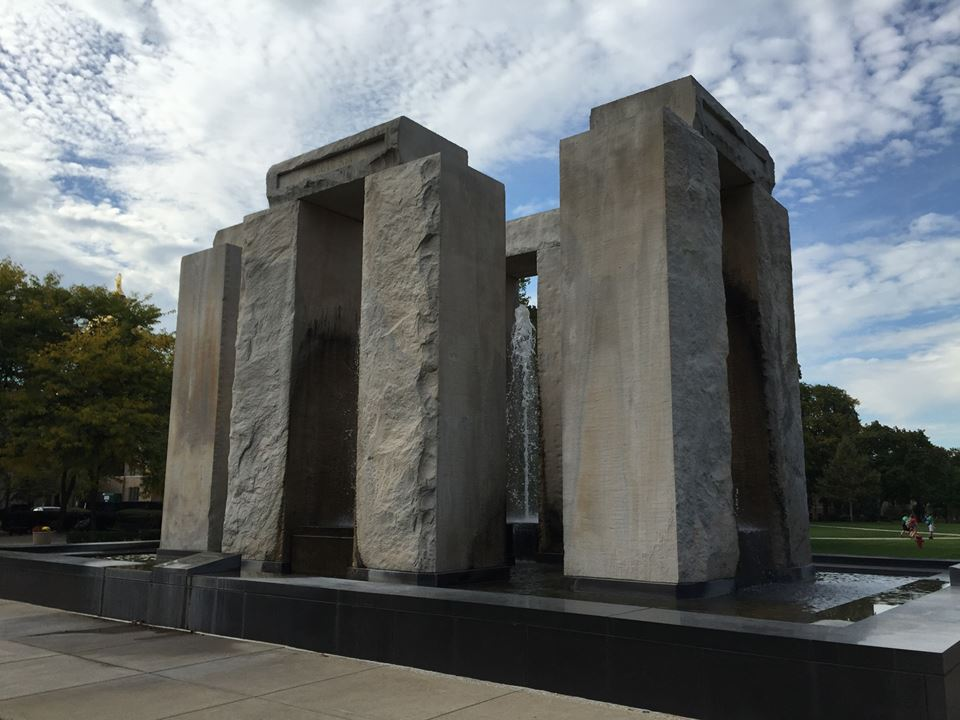
Clarke Memorial Fountain

Modeled after Stonehenge, it is a peace monument commemorating around 500 Notre Dame alumni who died in World War II, the Korean War, and Vietnam War. The names of those wars are carved in three of its arches, and the fourth arch bears the Latin inscription Pro Patria et Pace, "For Country and Peace." It was designed in 1983 by architects John Burgee (alumnus of the university) and Philip Johnson. It was dedicated in 1986, the fountain was underwritten by Notre Dame alumnus Thomas Shuff and by its principal benefactor, Maude Clarke of Chicago. Mrs. Clarke's donation was made in memory of her husband John, an investment banker who once served on the business college's advisory council. Both of the Clarkes had also been Army officers in World War II.

The Fountain is the centerpiece of Fieldhouse Mall, a park-like area with benches and formal gardens that graces the southern end of the quad. The mall serves as a crossway between Hesburgh Library and the Main Quad, but is also a popular place for festivals, social activities, and marching band rehearsals. The site was created when the Old Fieldhouse was torn down in 1983, and consistent with Notre Dame's steadfast sense of tradition, there now stands a buff brick monument to that long-gone gymnasium.

Saint Edward the Confessor

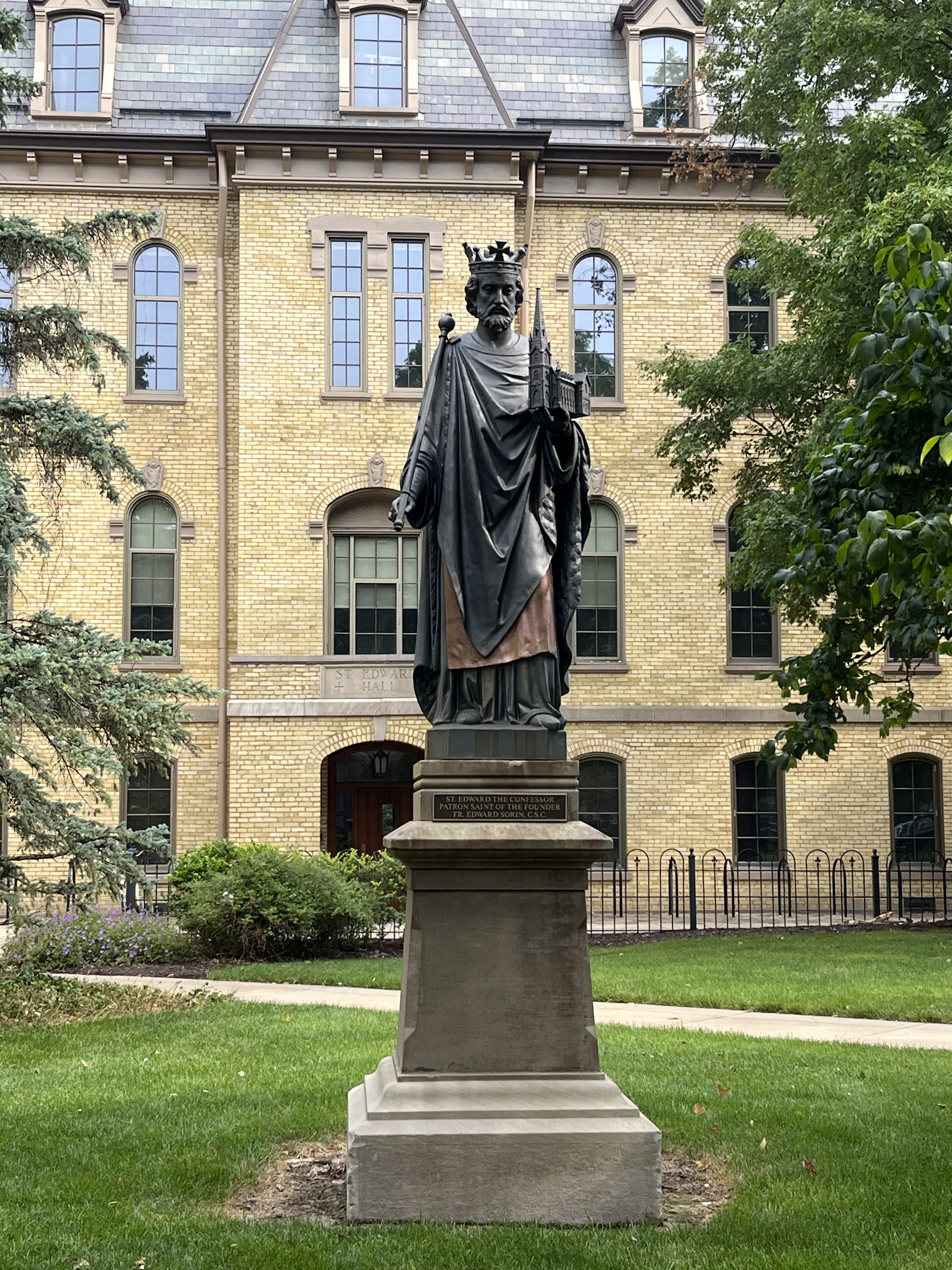
Saint Edward's Hall with statue, 2023

It was created by Froc-Robert & Sons in 1880. It was installed in 1883, gift of the Sorin association. St. Edward was the patron saint of Father Sorin. The statue is made of bronze and is tall approximately 7 feet tall. The statue holds a scepter and a small church, reminiscent of the campus basilica.

Moses

Located outside the west entrance of Hesburgh Library, it was created by Joseph Turkalji in 1962. His foot stands on the neck of a calf, and his right hand index finger points to the sky. It represents a passage from Exodus. As many Notre Dame statues, Moses has a double meaning regarding American football. He is either known as "First Down Moses" or "Number #1 Moses". The horns of the head of Moses are a common theme in art history (for example, Moses is depicted with horns also by Michelangelo) and is due to a common misreading of a quote from Exodus.

Christ and the Samaritan Woman

The sculpture featured is found gracing the western entrance of O'Shaughnessy Hall, the home of the College of Arts and Letters. It was executed in 1957 by the Croatian sculptor Ivan Meštrović, who was in residence at Notre Dame from 1955 until his death in 1962, on the model of a sculpture he had completed in wood relief thirty years earlier for a chapel in his native town of Split, Croatia. The Notre Dame sculpture, which depicts the Samaritan woman's gradual recognition of Jesus as the Savior as narrated in John 4:1–42, is full of expressive gesture that conveys the drama and subtle nuances of their communication. The statue is part of a memorial that includes benches, trees, and the statues of St. John and the prophet Isaiah.
