= Lucius G. Tong =

American politician, lawyer and academic (1842–1908)

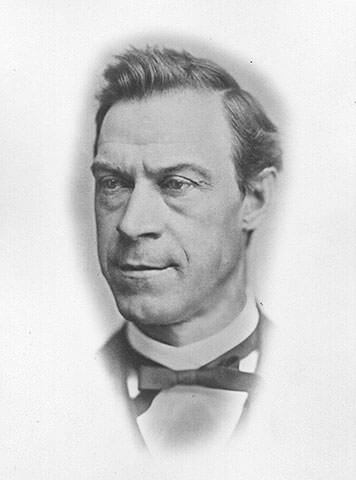

5th Mayor of South Bend, Indiana
- In office 1878–1880
- Preceded by: Alexander N. Thomas
- Succeeded by: Levi J. Ham

Personal details
- Born: Lucius Gillespie Tong; August 1, 1842 Carroll, Ohio, U.S.
- Died: April 12, 1908 (aged 65) South Bend, Indiana, U.S.
- Resting place: Cedar Grove Cemetery; Notre Dame, Indiana, U.S.
- Party: Republican
- Spouse: Bridget Cecilia Ball (m. 1873)
- Education: University of Notre Dame (LLB)

Lucius Gillespie Tong (August 1, 1842 – April 12, 1908) was a lawyer, professor at the University of Notre Dame, bank executive, and the fifth mayor of South Bend, Indiana.

== Early life and education ==
Tong was born in Carroll, Fairfield County, Ohio, on August 1, 1842, to Eleanor (née Poorman) and Oliver P. Tong. His father was a civil engineer.

In 1858 Tong began studies at Kenyon College, and in 1859 he entered the University of Notre Dame. He received a diploma in the Commercial Department at Notre Dame in 1861 and a Bachelor of Laws from Notre Dame in 1871.

== Career ==
Tong began teaching at Notre Dame in 1863 as Professor of Bookkeeping. Immediately after receiving his law degree in 1871, he also served as Professor of Commercial Civil Law. The following year he was identified as Dean of the Commercial Faculty, Professor of Bookkeeping and of Commercial and Civil Laws. By 1877 he was Director of the Law Department as well as Professor of Bookkeeping. He remained on the faculty of Notre Dame as Professor of Law and Bookkeeping until 1882, when he was appointed secretary of the St. Joseph County Savings Bank.

Tong and attorney John Hagerty established a practice as attorneys and real estate agents in South Bend in August 1873. In May 1874, Hagerty qualified as City Judge in South Bend and in 1875 Tong established a law practice of his own.

=== Political career ===
Tong was elected mayor of South Bend, Indiana, in 1878 on the Republican Party ticket, succeeding Republican Alexander N. Thomas. Tong defeated Democratic Party candidate Dwight Deming by a tally of 1262 to 1140 votes. While mayor, he had the opportunity to meet U.S. president Rutherford B. Hayes during a brief stop of the president in South Bend. Tong served one term as mayor, losing his bid for re-election in 1880 to Democrat Levi J. Ham by a tally of 1317 to 1076 votes. Although he was mentioned as a possible candidate for mayor in 1888, he never held any other political office. A newspaper history written more than 25 years after his term as mayor noted that Tong's "administration was noted for the great amount of routine business disposed of in a given time," and that Tong "wasted no time with talk that was not directly to the point ... being of methodical habits he wanted to see the budget cleaned up at each session." Mayor Tong was largely responsible for securing for the city "Heck's addition," the tract of land now known as Howard Park (used at the time for dumping purposes). Notable legislation that was considered by the city council during Tong's service as mayor involved the paving of several streets in South Bend with cedar blocks, rather than clay bricks.

=== Banking ===
Tong was elected a trustee of the St. Joseph County Savings Bank in 1878, was appointed Vice President in 1880, secretary (also known as “cashier”) in May 1882, and treasurer in 1904. He was appointed secretary-treasurer of the St. Joseph Loan and Trust Co. when it was organized in 1900.

In 1904 he was elected president of the newly formed South Bend Clearing House Association, organized to facilitate business between the city's financial institutions.

In late 1907 Tong suffered a nervous breakdown which was attributed to the nationwide financial crisis known as the Panic of 1907. He died on April 12, 1908, at his home at 207 South Scott Street in South Bend. He was buried at Cedar Grove Cemetery in Notre Dame, Indiana.

== Personal life ==
Tong was a founding member of the St. Joseph Total Abstinence Society (a temperance group organized in 1874 for young Catholic men), the South Bend branch of the Land League (organized to provide support to the “oppressed tenantry of Ireland”), and the local chapter of the League of American Wheelmen (established in 1890 to promote cycling). He also served as the first president of the Municipal Voters' League of South Bend (intended to promote good government).

Tong married Bridget Cecilia Ball, daughter of James Ball, of Lafayette, Indiana, on September 8, 1873. She was a native of Ireland and the daughter of a prominent wholesale grocer in Lafayette. They were the parents of eight children, six of whom survived to adulthood.
