= Grotto of Our Lady of Lourdes, Notre Dame =

Religious site in Indiana, United States

Grotto of Our Lady of Lourdes
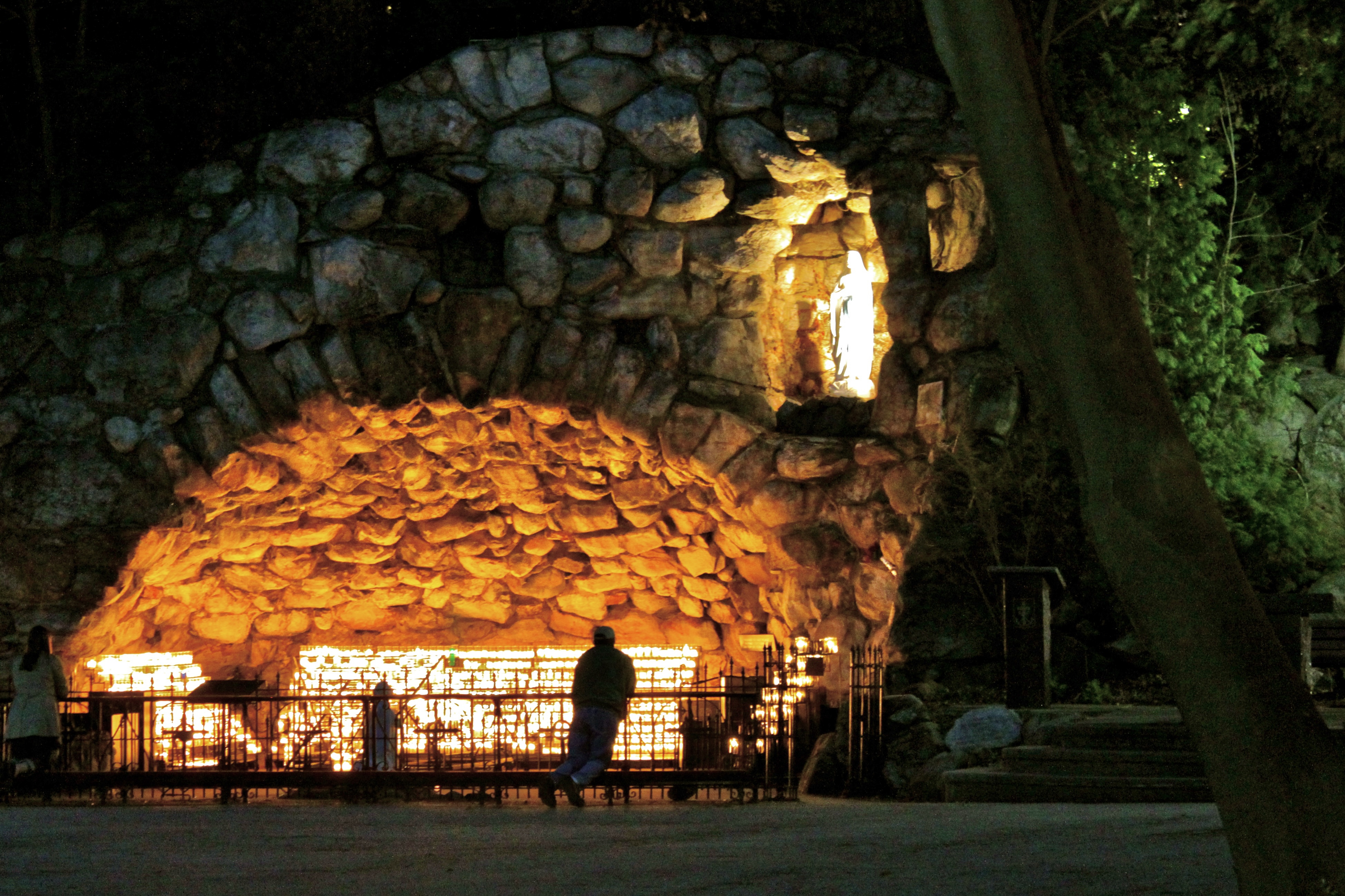
- The grotto in 2011
- Interactive map of Grotto of Our Lady of Lourdes
- Location: University of Notre Dame, Notre Dame, Indiana, U.S.
- Coordinates: 41°42′11″N 86°14′25″W
- Type: Lourdes grotto
- Material: Stone
- Beginning date: Spring 1896
- Opening date: August 5, 1896
- Dedicated to: Our Lady of Lourdes

The Grotto of Our Lady of Lourdes is located at the University of Notre Dame in Notre Dame, Indiana, United States, and is a reproduction of the Grotto of Our Lady of Lourdes in Lourdes, France. The Grotto was built in 1896, replacing a wooden grotto built on August 22, 1878. An artificial rock cave, the Grotto is used by its visitors as a sacred space for prayer, meditation, and outdoor Mass.

Rev. Edward Sorin, C.S.C., the French Holy Cross priest who founded the University of Notre Dame in 1842 on a tract of land in Northern Indiana, had a lifelong devotion to Mary. He named several structures on the nascent campus after the Blessed Virgin Mary, and, seeking to attract Catholic pilgrims to Notre Dame, he constructed a replica of the Portiuncula—a Marian chapel located in the Papal Basilica of Saint Mary of the Angels in Assisi. After a trip to the Sanctuary of Our Lady of Lourdes in 1873, Sorin sought to create a replica of the Lourdes Grotto at the university's campus; the replica of the Grotto was constructed beginning in the spring of 1878 and was completed by the end of summertime. The replica was a wooden structure that sat atop a small rock wall, complete with several religious statues, and adjacent to the Church of the Sacred Heart. Less than three years after Sorin's death in 1893, a replacement for this first Grotto was announced.

The construction of the replacement Grotto began in the spring of 1896. Unlike the first replica, it's replacement took the form of a rock cave, located downhill from the church rather than adjacent to it. Thomas Carroll, a Catholic priest, funded the construction, and the construction was overseen by local contractor John Gill. A natural spring was discovered during the construction of the Grotto, and the Grotto collapsed during construction. Construction was completed on August 5, and the Grotto was dedicated on Our Lady of Snows. Subsequent renovations have taken place, including one to fix a leak in the Grotto's ceiling and remediation following a large fire in 1985 that had caused damage to the rocks composing the Grotto. A more recent renovation, in 2019, substantially re-landscaped the Grotto and involved restoration work on the statues at the Grotto.

== History ==
=== Edward Sorin and his Marian devotion ===
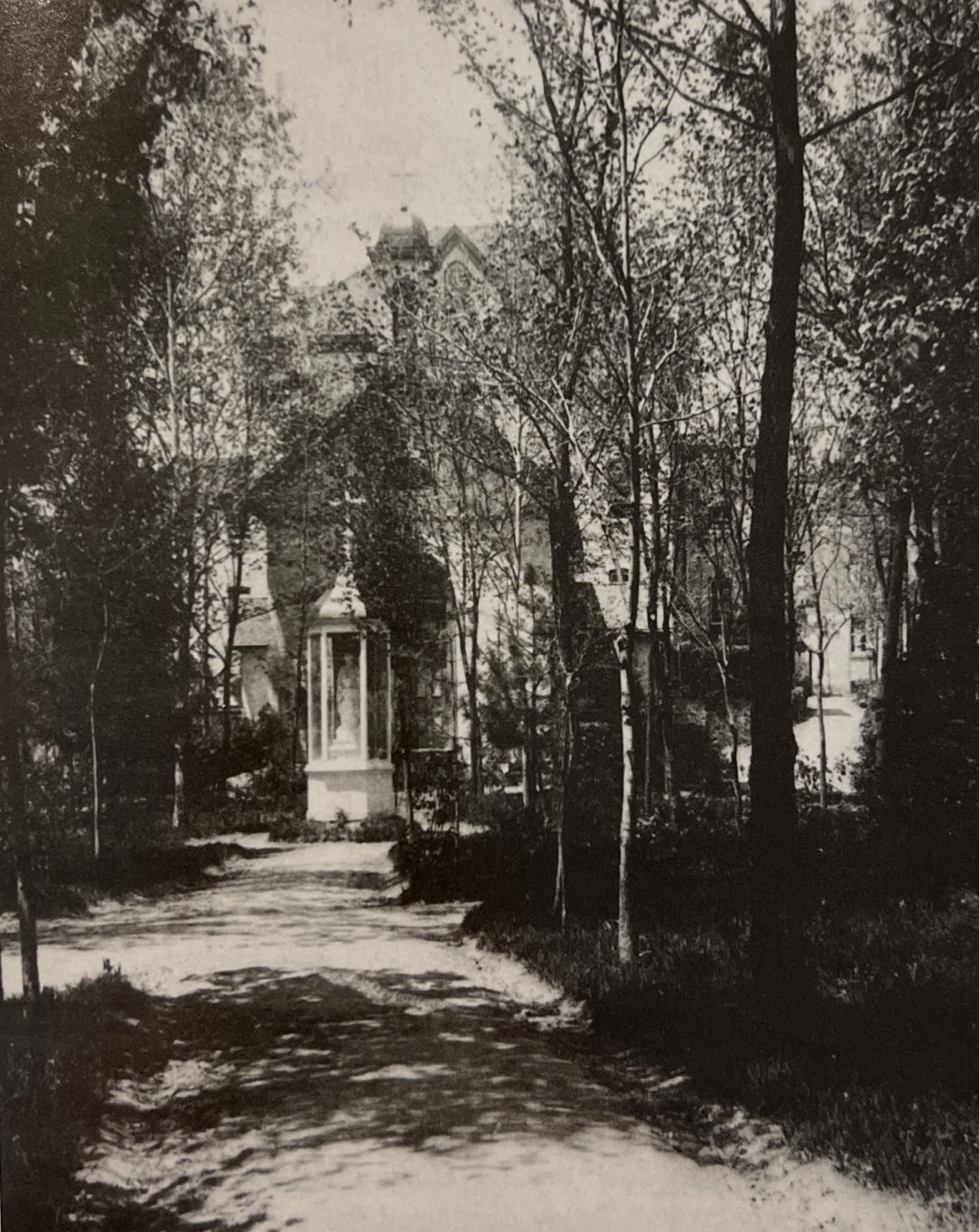
Notre Dame's replica of the Portiuncula Chapel was constructed in 1861. It was demolished in 1898.

Rev. Edward Sorin, C.S.C., the French Holy Cross priest who founded the University of Notre Dame, had a lifelong devotion to the Blessed Virgin Mary and named several institutions he created after her. In 1842, he founded the university in the midst of what was then wilderness in northern Indiana at a former Jesuit mission site that was then-named Sainte-Marie-des-Lacs (lit. "Saint Mary of the Lakes"), giving the site the French name of Notre Dame du Lac (lit. "Our Lady of the Lake") after the Mother of God. He and several Holy Cross Brothers, with whom he had traveled to the New World, began to construct a chapel by Saint Mary's Lake, which they completed in 1844. On December 8, 1844, Sorin dedicated the newly built chapel to Our Lady of the Lake, naming the building the "Chapel of the Most Holy and Immaculate Heart of Mary". Several years later, in 1855, he granted the Sisters of the Holy Cross a parcel of land along the St. Joseph River, where they would build the Academy of St. Mary's of the Immaculate Conception—an educational institution that would later become Saint Mary's College. Sorin would also see through the construction of the Church of the Sacred Heart, named after Our Lady of the Sacred Heart.

Sorin sought to encourage Catholic pilgrims to make trips to Notre Dame. To do so, he first ordered the construction of a replica of the Portiuncula Chapel, a chapel dedicated to Mary within the Church of Saint Mary of the Angels in Assisi, on a thin strip of land by Saint Mary's Lake. This replica chapel, which replaced the Chapel of the Most Holy and Immaculate Heart of Mary that had been destroyed in 1858, was the first religious site at Notre Dame to be composed as a copy of a European Catholic site, but it would not be the last.

==== Sorin and Our Lady of Lourdes ====
In the 1870s, Sorin and Mother Angela Gillespie, a Holy Cross Sister, who had become in charge of Saint Mary's, began to take a particular interest in Our Lady of Lourdes, an 1858 Marian apparition that occurred in Lourdes, France. Lourdes water was shipped across the Atlantic to Notre Dame, and an office was established to handle requests related to obtaining the water that Catholics had begun to consider holy. In 1873, Sorin and Mother Angela both made a pilgrimage to the Sanctuary of Our Lady of Lourdes; the two later described their experiences on the pilgrimage positively, and each brought back religious statues from Europe that depicted individuals involved in the Lourdes apparition. Following their return from Europe, Lourdes-related imagery and replicas began to proliferate on the campuses of Notre Dame and Saint Mary's; a replica of the Grotto at which Bernadette Soubirous is said to have seen apparitions in Lourdes was constructed inside of a building at Saint Mary's in 1874, while the sanctuary lamp in Notre Dame's Church of the Sacred Heart was replaced in 1875 with a newly ordered exact replica of the sanctuary lamp present in the Sanctuary of Our Lady of Lourdes.

=== The first grotto at Notre Dame ===
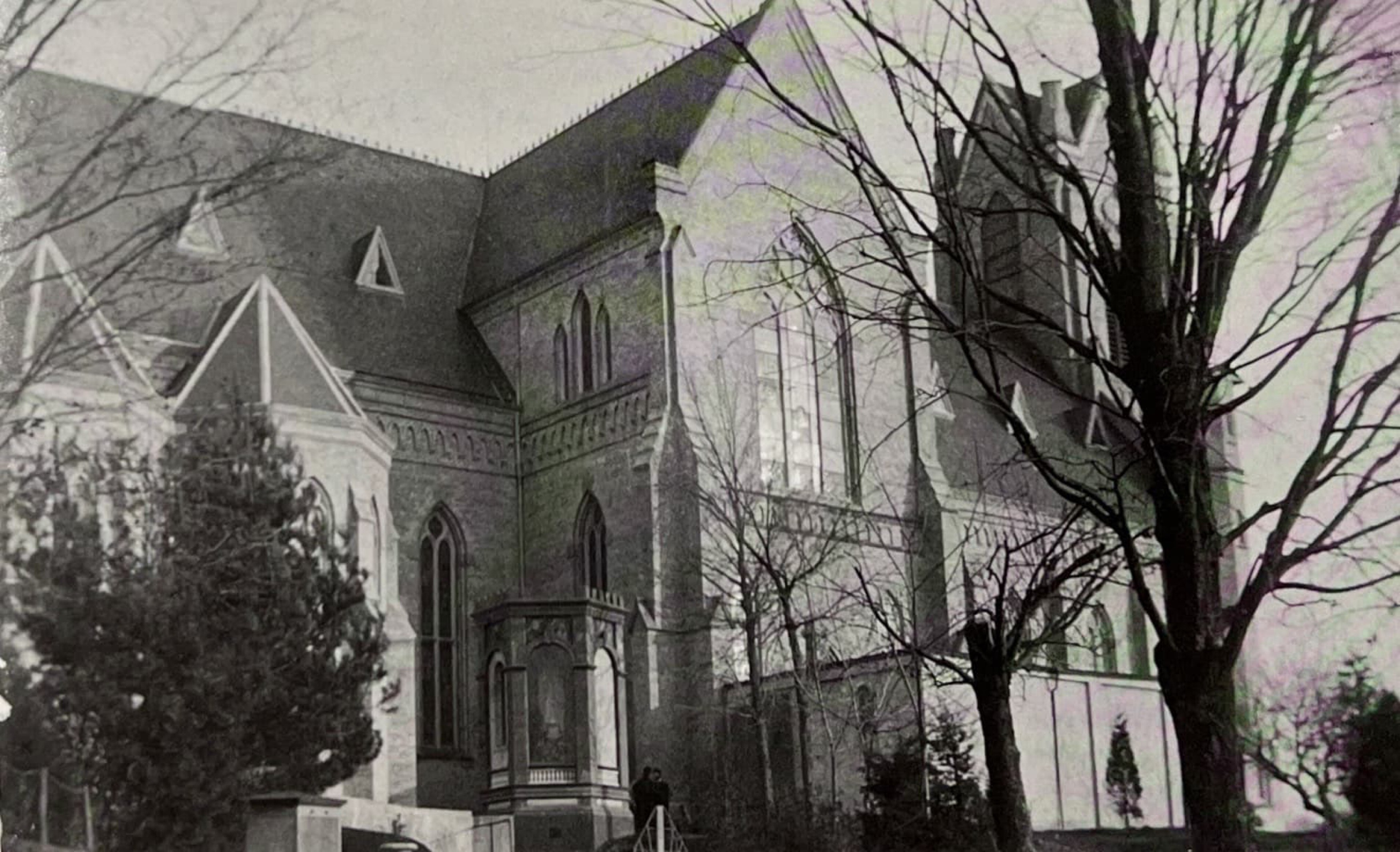
A photograph of the top portion of the front of the octagonal first grotto, taken in 1886. No photographs of the bottom portion of the first grotto are known to exist.

In September 1877, Sorin stated that he would make a replica shrine at Notre Dame in every respect a facsimile of the original, with the exception of not having a copy of the 200-foot (61 m) high wall of rock that is present at the Lourdes Grotto. Work on the Grotto began by April in the following springtime, and it was dedicated on the Feast of the Assumption that summer in a ceremony that involved over 200 Holy Cross brothers and 400 Holy Cross sisters. Rather than being a large rock cave, however, Sorin's Grotto was a wooden octagonal structure with glass panes, fifteen feet (4.6 m) in height by seven feet (2.1 m) in diameter with a three-foot (0.91 m) pedestal, and located at the northwest of the church, between the sacristy and the apse chapels. It featured a statue of Mary and stood atop a small rock wall with a fountain and garden, and a statue of Bernadette Soubirous. Sorin's Grotto would remain in place throughout his life; he died on Halloween in 1893 and Rev. William Corby, C.S.C. succeeded him in leading Notre Dame's priests. Sorin's Grotto did not persist long after his death; two-and-a-half years after Sorin's death, Corby announced that Sorin's Grotto would be replaced.

=== Construction and dedication of the current Grotto ===
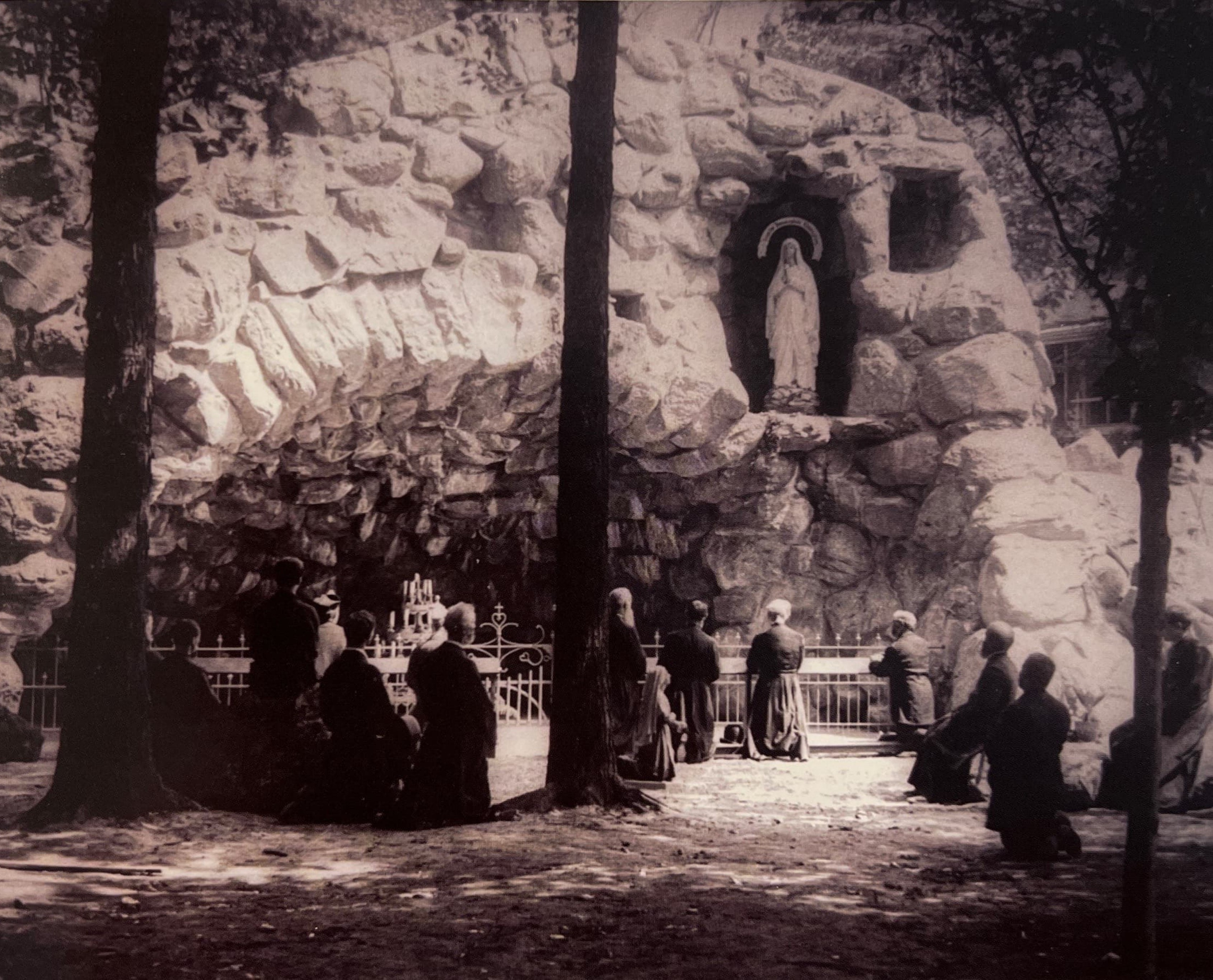
The Grotto of Our Lady of Lourdes in 1896. This is the oldest known photograph of the current Grotto.

In 1896, Corby sought to build a larger Grotto that more accurately copied the Grotto in Lourdes. Construction on the new Grotto began in the spring of that year after an Irish-American priest by the name of Thomas Carroll donated a sum of $2,500 (equivalent to $67,899 in 2020) to fund its construction. Rather than building the new Grotto between the sacristy and the apse chapels of the Church of the Sacred Heart, the new Grotto was constructed down the hill from the church closer to Saint Mary's Lake; it was built atop the location that the charred remains of the main building had been spread after it had burned down in 1879, which itself had been built atop to hold a garden of Sorin's.

The Grotto was built that spring and summer from boulders and stones collected from local farms. The construction was performed by contractor John Gill, who provided stone for the construction of the Grotto alongside a farmer by the name of O. P. Stuckey. Brickmasons who worked on the Grotto included Charles McCoy, Boleslaus Luznay, Nick Kowalski, Laislaf Kowalski, and Victor Callicrate. During construction, the Grotto collapsed and Robert Braunsdorf, an architect, was brought in to solve engineering issues with the Grotto's stonework. The work continued on thereafter. Also during construction, a natural spring beneath the Grotto was discovered; the spring's location relative to the Grotto at Notre Dame was similar to the relative position of the spring from which Lourdes water is drawn to the Grotto at Lourdes. However, the spring at Notre Dame was covered up and replaced with a hand water pump shortly after its discovery.

The group completed the construction of the Grotto by August of that year, and the Grotto was blessed on August 5, 1896, ten days ahead of schedule—and the 55th anniversary of the beginning of Sorin's voyage from France to the New World. The dedication ceremony was described by contemporaneous sources as extremely ornate; The Annals of Our Lady of Lourdes described the dedication as containing "a simple grandeur that is not usually seen outside of Catholic countries" and stated that over five hundred priests, brothers, and sisters were in attendance. Minor renovations and repairs, such as to fix a leak in the roof of the Grotto left during construction, would continue in the years after the Grotto's creation.

=== The Grotto's early years ===
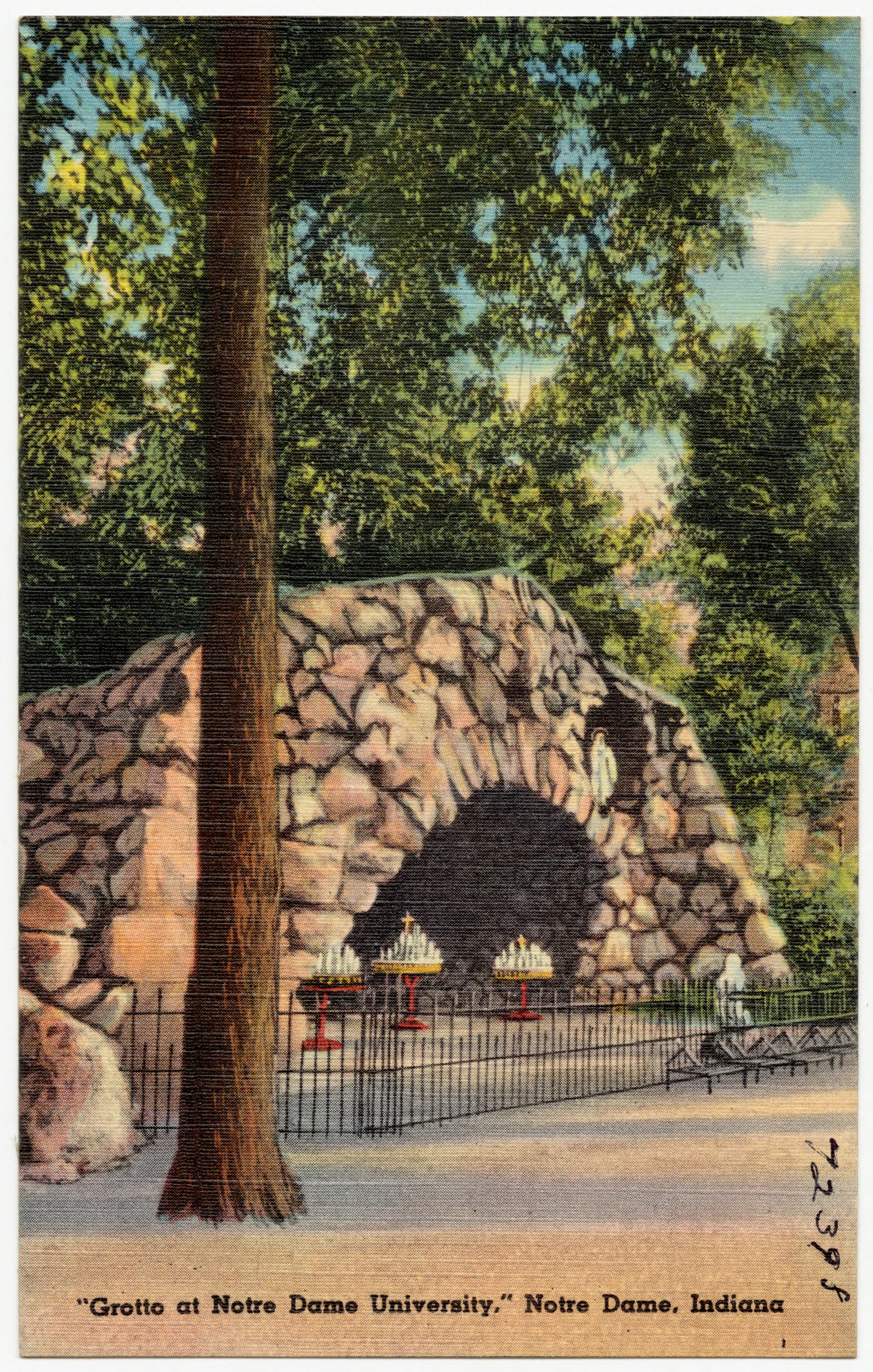
A postcard depicting the grotto at Notre Dame, c. 1930 – c. 1945

After the completion of the new Grotto in 1896, the Grotto quickly became a pilgrimage site for American Catholics. The design of the Grotto allowed for pilgrims to sit and attend religious services in an area in front of the Grotto, and many of those who were on pilgrimage fetched water from the Grotto's installed water pump. Early pilgrims to the Grotto took interest in the spring water, with some even attributing miracles to the water at Notre Dame—just as miracles are attributed to the water at Lourdes—though the interest in the Grotto's spring water by pilgrims died down in the Grotto's early years.

The Grotto soon became a site frequented by students at Notre Dame, with organized evening song and prayer at the Grotto becoming a tradition in the late 1920s. Two black stones once part of the Grotto of Our Lady of Lourdes in France would arrive at Notre Dame in the mid-twentieth century; the smaller of the two stones first arrived in 1939, while the large stone arrived in 1958.

=== 1985 fire ===
Following a football game between the Notre Dame Fighting Irish and the Michigan State Spartans, visitors began to leave burning candles on the ground after the iron racks typically used to hold the candles were completely filled up; the total number of candles placed at the Grotto that weekend numbered about fifteen hundred. On the morning of Monday, September 23, 1985, the Grotto was engulfed in flames; before the flames were doused, the fire damaged the rocks inside the grotto and the statue of the Blessed Virgin Mary, while many plants situated atop the grotto were killed in the fire. The Grotto would re-open one week later after it had been cleaned and inspected for structural integrity.

=== Recent history ===
The grotto underwent an extensive renovation in the summer of 2019. The renovation re-landscaped the area around the Grotto and involved restoration work on the statues at the Grotto. A historical marker nearby details the Grotto's history and significance.

== Description ==
The modern grotto is a replica of the Lourdes Grotto in France, scaled down to be about one-third the size of the original rock cave. While the use of the Grotto as a Lourdes-like pilgrimage site has diminished over the years, the Grotto has taken on a life of its own as a key part and symbol of religious life at the University of Notre Dame. It is one of the quietest and most serene spots on the campus and is used for reflection, prayer, meditation, and outdoor masses. It is a popular spot for wedding proposals and photoshoots. The grotto is also popular with campus visitors and tourists and is quite busy during football weekends.

=== Surroundings ===
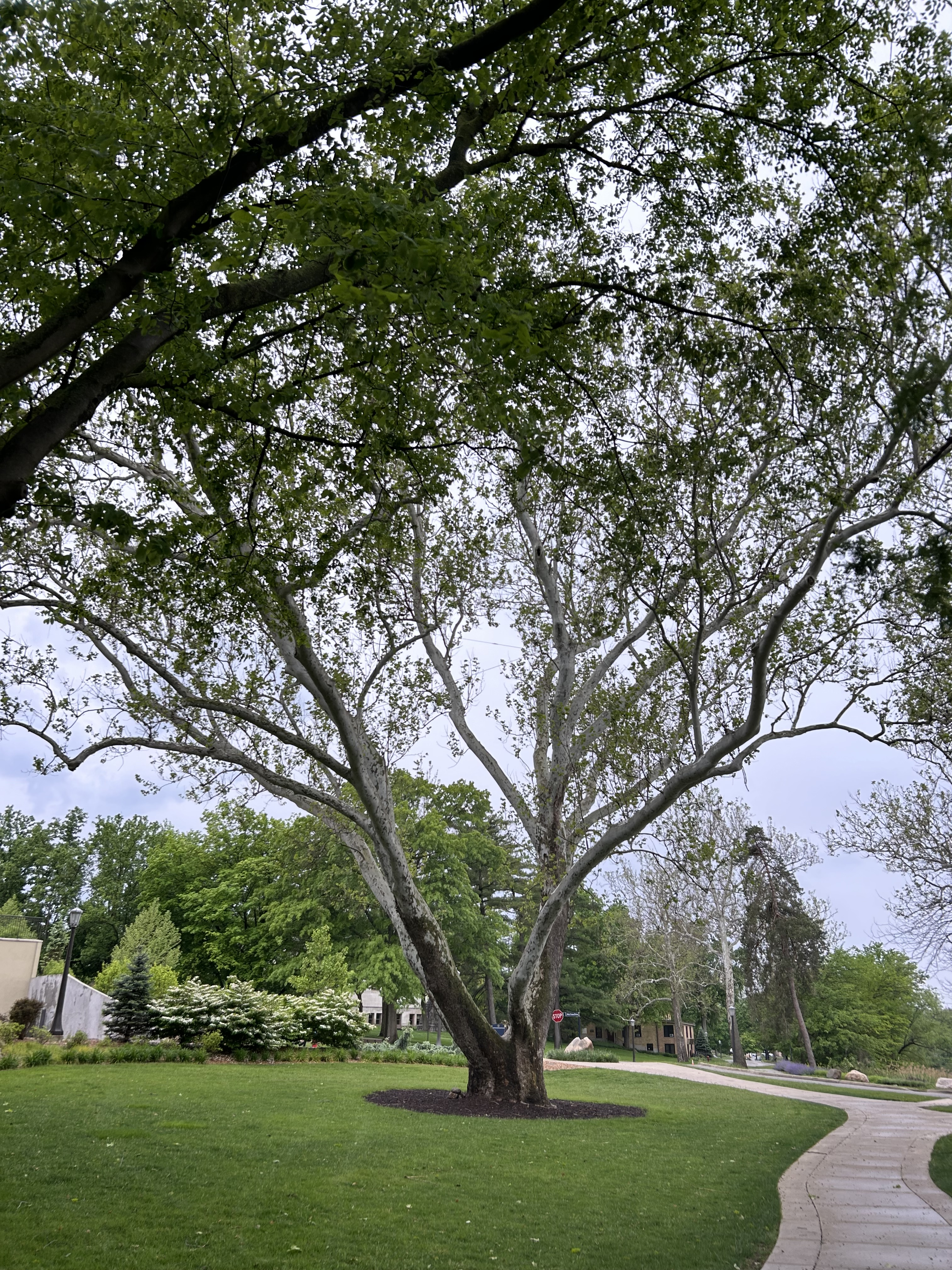
The Superstition Tree, as seen from the Grotto

The Grotto is located down a hill adjacent to the Basilica of the Sacred Heart. Nearby the Grotto is an approximately 230-year-old Sycamore tree whose girth measured 20.33 feet (6.20 m) as of 2006, also known as Vengeance Tree or Superstition Tree.

== Gallery ==
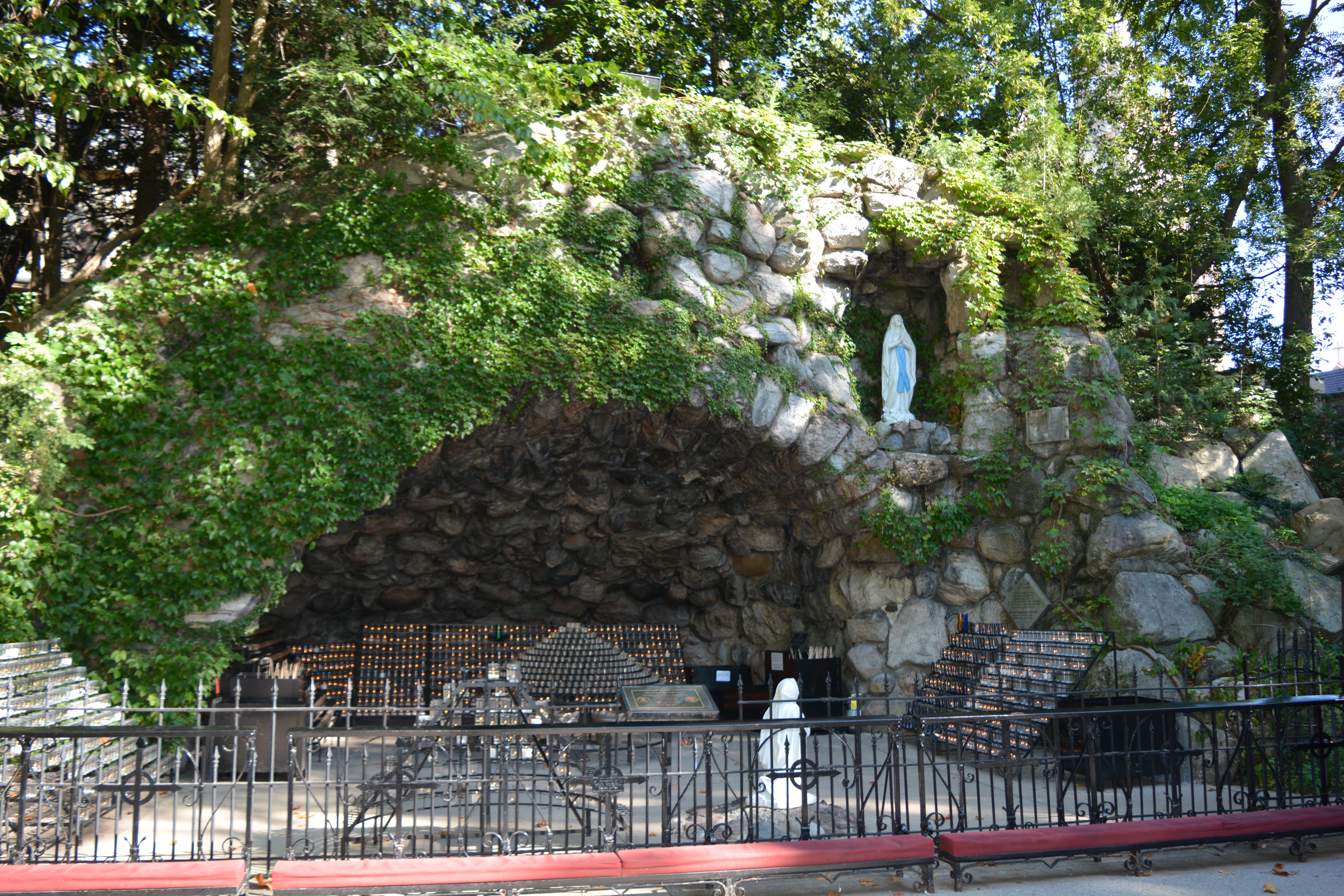
The grotto during the daytime

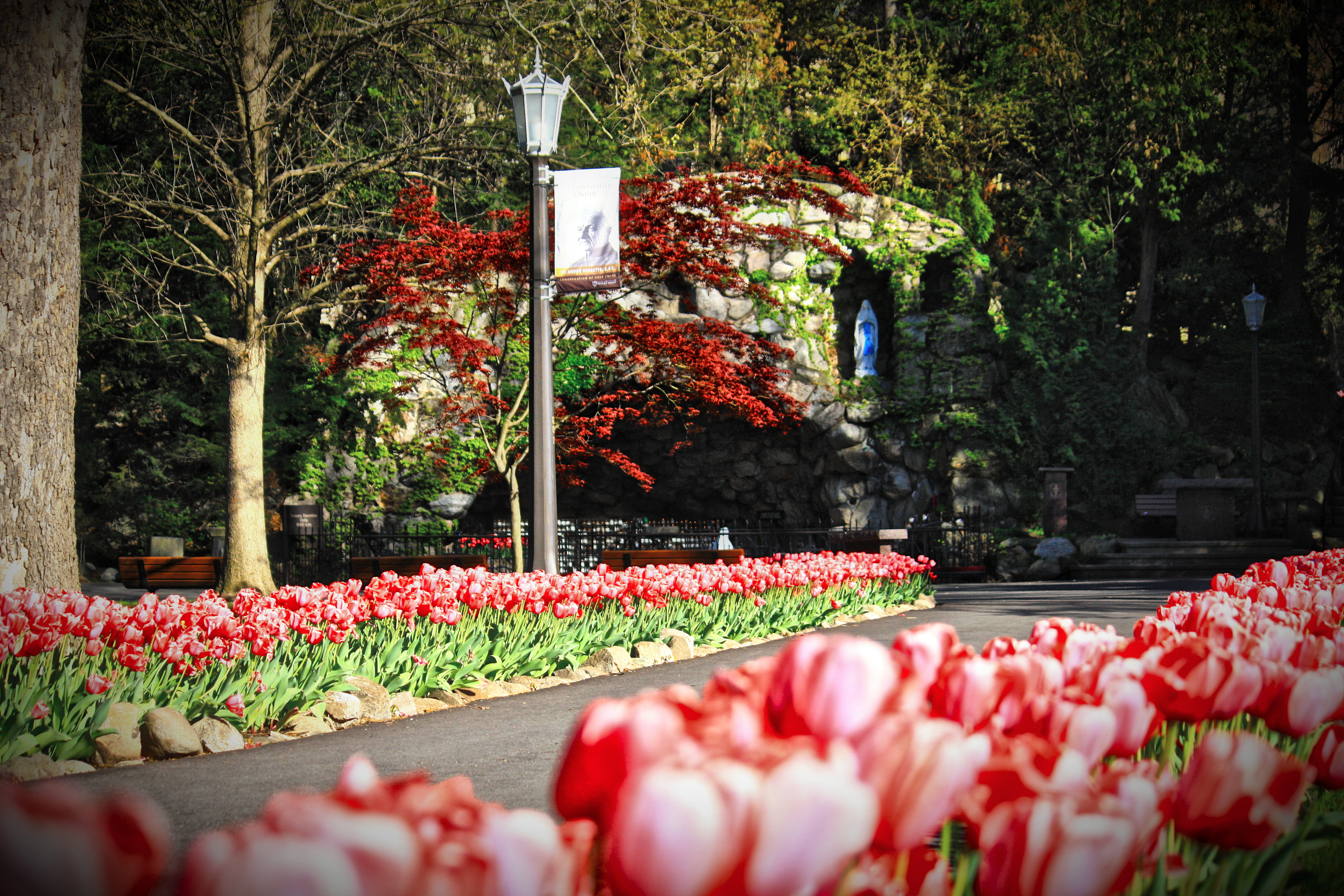
The grotto and surrounding landscaping

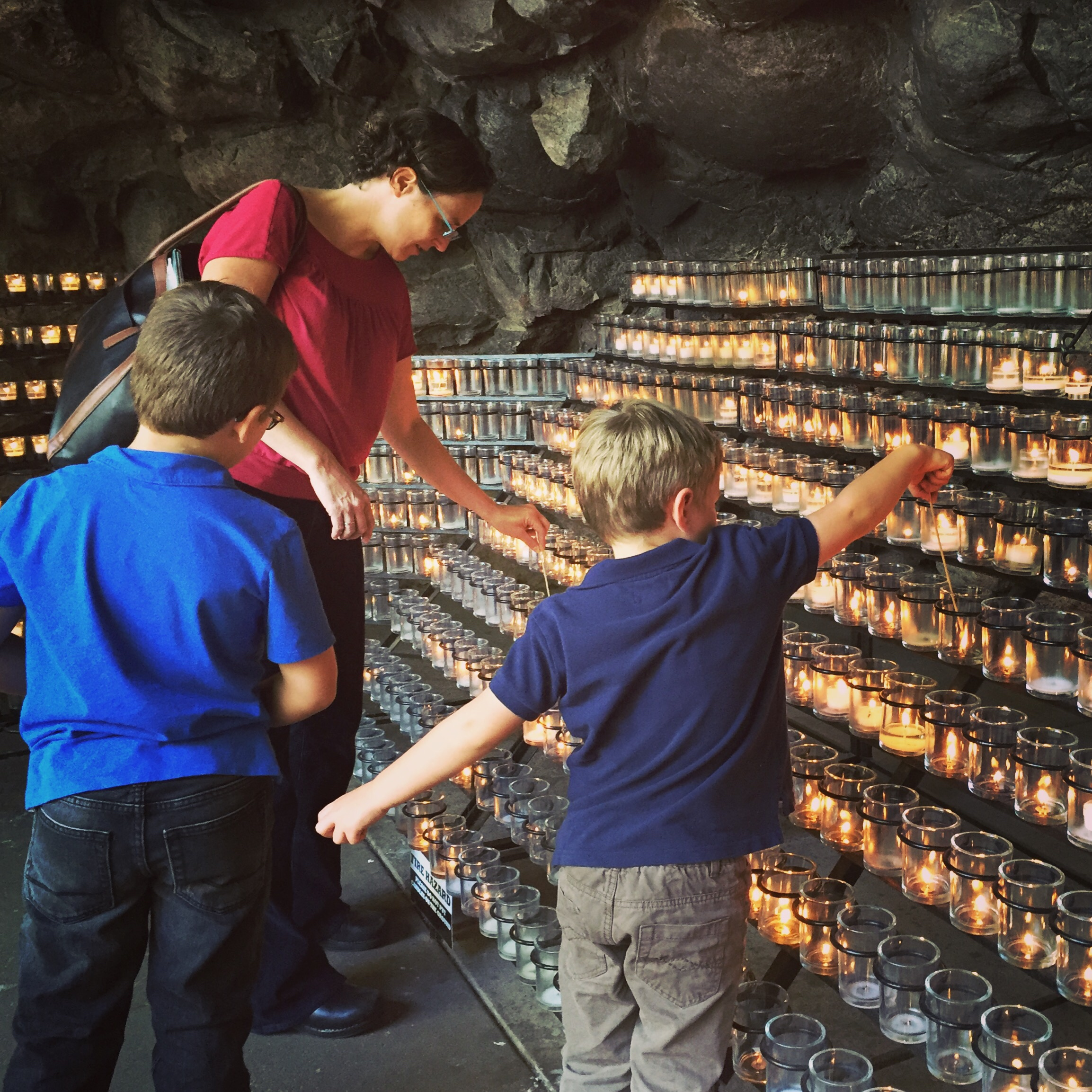
A mother and her children lighting candles at the grotto

== See also ==
- Statue of Thomas Anthony Dooley III
