= Word of Life (mural) =

Mural in Notre Dame, Indiana, U.S.

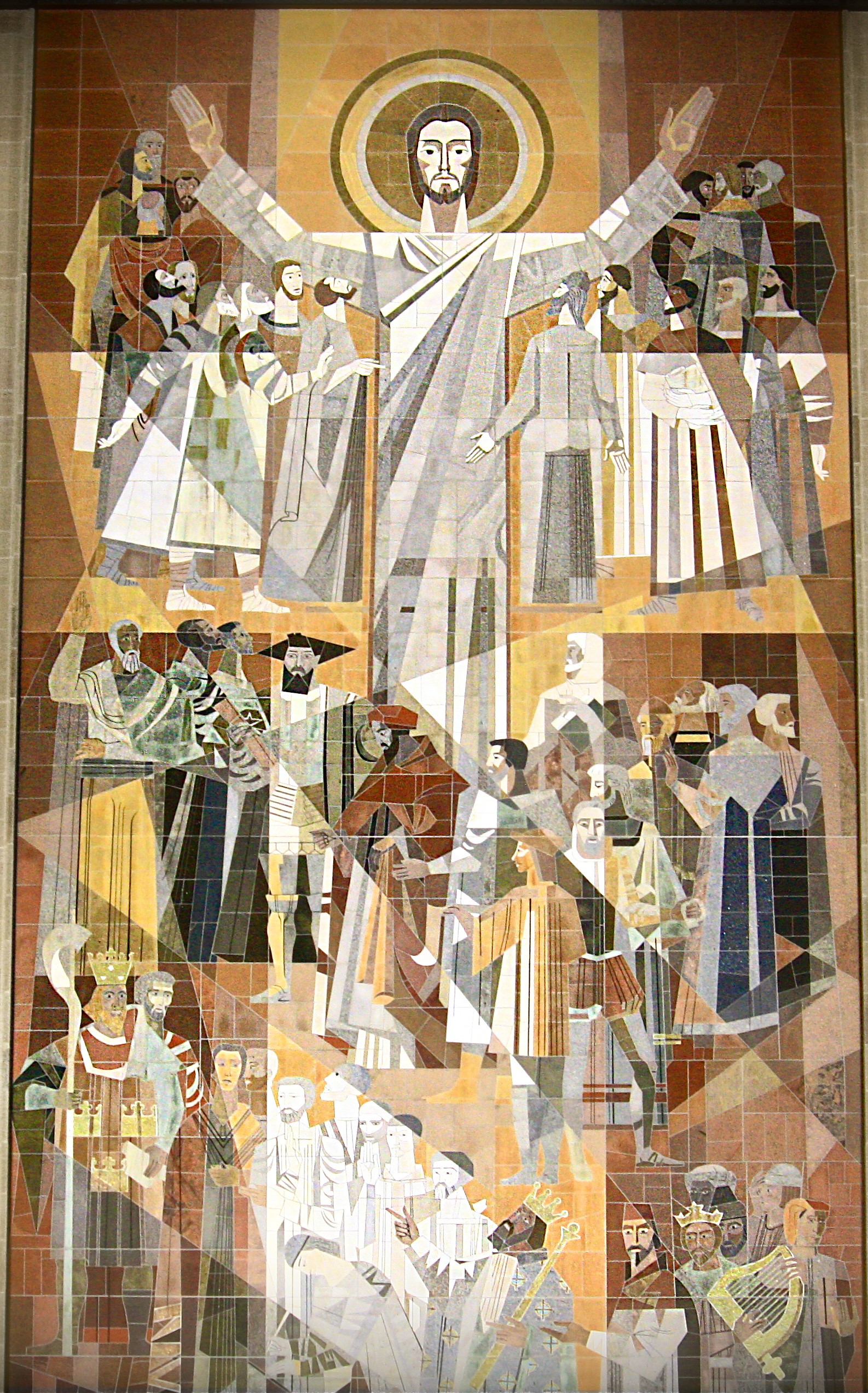
- Artist: Millard Sheets
- Year: 1964
- Medium: stone mosaic
- Location: Notre Dame, Indiana, U.S.; 41°42′8″N 86°14′3″W

Word of Life, commonly referred to as Touchdown Jesus, is a 1964 mural by American artist Millard Sheets on the side of Hesburgh Library, on the University of Notre Dame campus in Notre Dame, Indiana, United States. The artwork measures 134 feet (41 m) high and 68 feet (21 m) wide. It received "preventive maintenance" in 2011.

== Description ==
The artwork depicts a procession of figures representing Christian saints, thinkers, teachers, and writers, a topic that connected to the idea of the library. Figures were selected from different centuries and places to convey the concept of the Catholic Church's historical continuity. At the top of the procession the central figure is the resurrected Jesus Christ, conceived as the great teacher and master, and the fountain of knowledge contained in the library. The artwork, which is titled Word of Life, is 134 feet (41 m) tall and 68 feet (21 m) wide.

The mural's image of Jesus, visible from Notre Dame's football stadium, has arms raised in the same fashion as a referee signifying a touchdown. From this similarity came the mural's nickname, Touchdown Jesus. A stadium expansion partially obscures views of the mural from the field.

== History ==
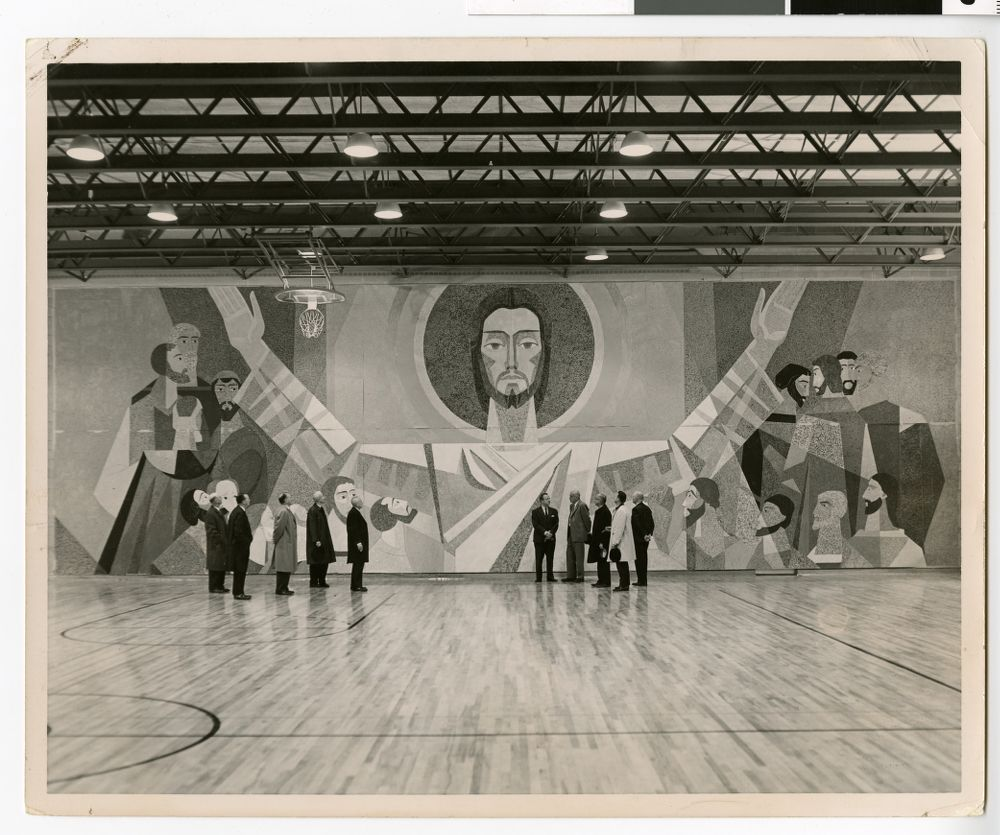
A mock up of a section of the mural on a wall of St. Boniface High School gymnasium, Cold Spring, MN

The idea of a mural on the facade had been conceived early, in part for the need to decorate the large structure which otherwise would have seemed dull and resembled a large grain silo. Hesburgh was also inspired by the mosaic murals of the Central Library at the National Autonomous University of Mexico in Mexico City, which he had visited in April 1955. One of the Central Library's murals explored the "necessity of secularization in the pursuit of academic freedom." In response, Hesburgh hoped to provide a Catholic counterpoint, that faith and reason could go together.

When the library opened in 1963, the mural had not yet been installed. California-based Sheets, a specialist in large-scale mosaics, was commissioned to create a work large enough to cover the entire side of the library facing Notre Dame's football stadium. Fr. Theodore Hesburgh suggested that the theme should be saints and scholars through the ages. The artwork cost $200,000 and was donated by Mr. and Mrs. Howard V. Phalin of Winnetka, Illinois. Installation took place in the spring of 1964; the dedication ceremony was held on May 7, 1964. The mural is composed of 324 panels. It consists of 81 different stones from 16 countries in 171 finishes that includes 46 granites and syenites, 10 gabbros and labradorites, 4 metamorphic gneisses, 12 serpentines, 4 crystalline marbles, and 5 limestones. The stone for the mural was cut by the Cold Spring Granite Company in Cold Spring, MN. Once cut, the stones for the mural were staged in the Saint Boniface High School gymnasium.

== See also ==
- Campus of the University of Notre Dame
