= George W. Loughman =

American mayor (1846–1909)

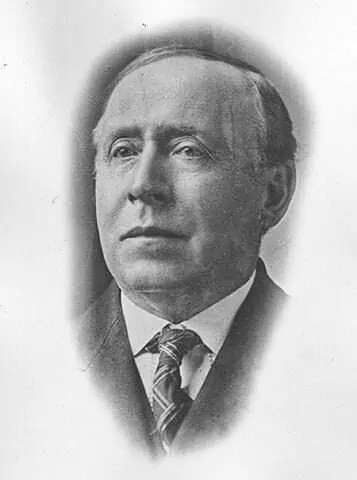

St. Joseph County Auditor
- In office 1898–1903

7th Mayor of South Bend, Indiana
- In office 1884–1888
- Preceded by: Levi J. Ham
- Succeeded by: William H. Longley

Personal details
- Born: December 25, 1846; Brownsville, Ohio, U.S.
- Died: February 28, 1909 (aged 62); South Bend, Indiana, U.S.
- Resting place: Riverview Cemetery; South Bend, Indiana, U.S.
- Political party: Republican

George W. Loughman (December 25, 1846 – February 28, 1909) served in the U.S. Army during the American Civil War, was a businessman, and served two terms as mayor of South Bend, Indiana (1884 - 1888). He was also on the town council and an auditor for the county.

== Early life ==
Loughman was born on December 25, 1846, in Brownsville, Ohio to David and Elizabeth Loughman.

== Career ==
Loughman served in Company G of the 32nd Ohio Infantry Regiment. He served two years and was present during Sherman's March to the Sea in Georgia.

He worked for a railroad and eventually became president and general manager of Sandage Steel Skein Company. He was a member of the Republican Party. The city had steady growth during his administration. In 1905 he was set to lead the Columbus Skein & Iron Works. He served as president of the South Bend Building and Loan Association.

Loughman was appointed Deputy St. Joseph County Auditor, a role in which he served until 1892. He was later elected St. Joseph County Auditor, serving from 1898 to 1903.

== Personal life ==
Loughman died on February 28, 1909, at his home at 716 South Michigan Street in South Bend. He was buried at Riverview Cemetery in South Bend.

== See also ==
- List of mayors of South Bend, Indiana
