= Levi J. Ham =

American politician

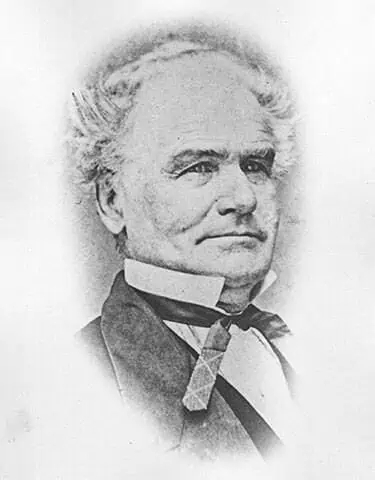
- Portrait of Ham

Member of the Maine Senate from the York County district
- In office 1837–1838

6th Mayor of South Bend, Indiana
- In office 1880–1884
- Preceded by: Lucius G. Tong
- Succeeded by: George W. Loughman

Personal details
- Born: Levi Jefferson Ham; November 16, 1805 Shapleigh, Massachusetts
- Died: June 11, 1887 (aged 81)
- Party: Democratic Party
- Children: 2
- Education: Dartmouth College; Bowdoin College
- Profession: Surgeon

Levi Jefferson Ham (November 16, 1805 – June 11, 1887) was an American politician and surgeon.

Ham was born in Shapleigh, Massachusetts, on November 16, 1805, to a family of Scottish descent. Ham graduated from Dartmouth College in 1828, and received his medical degree from Bowdoin College in 1831. He worked as a doctor in York County, Maine from 1831 until 1845 and then in Erie County, New York from 1846 until 1859, when he relocated to South Bend. Ham maintained a medical practice until 1871.

Ham won election to the Maine Senate in September 1835 and served between 1837 and 1838. During Ham's term in the state senate, he served as senate president and was involved in establishing an insane asylum in Maine. He also served on its board. Ham had a role in negotiating the border dispute with Britain. He eventually moved to New York and then South Bend. During the American Civil War, Ham was attached to the 48th Indiana Infantry Regiment. He had extensive service as a surgeon overseeing hospitals and care at various military posts. He was a reluctant mayor of South Bend who served from 1880 to 1884. As mayor of South Bend, he was a member of the Democratic Party.

Ham had a son and a daughter. His son Moses M. Ham ran the Dubuque Herald and served in the Iowa Senate. Levi J. Ham died from dropsy on June 11, 1887.
