= Hesburgh Library =

Library at the University of Notre Dame

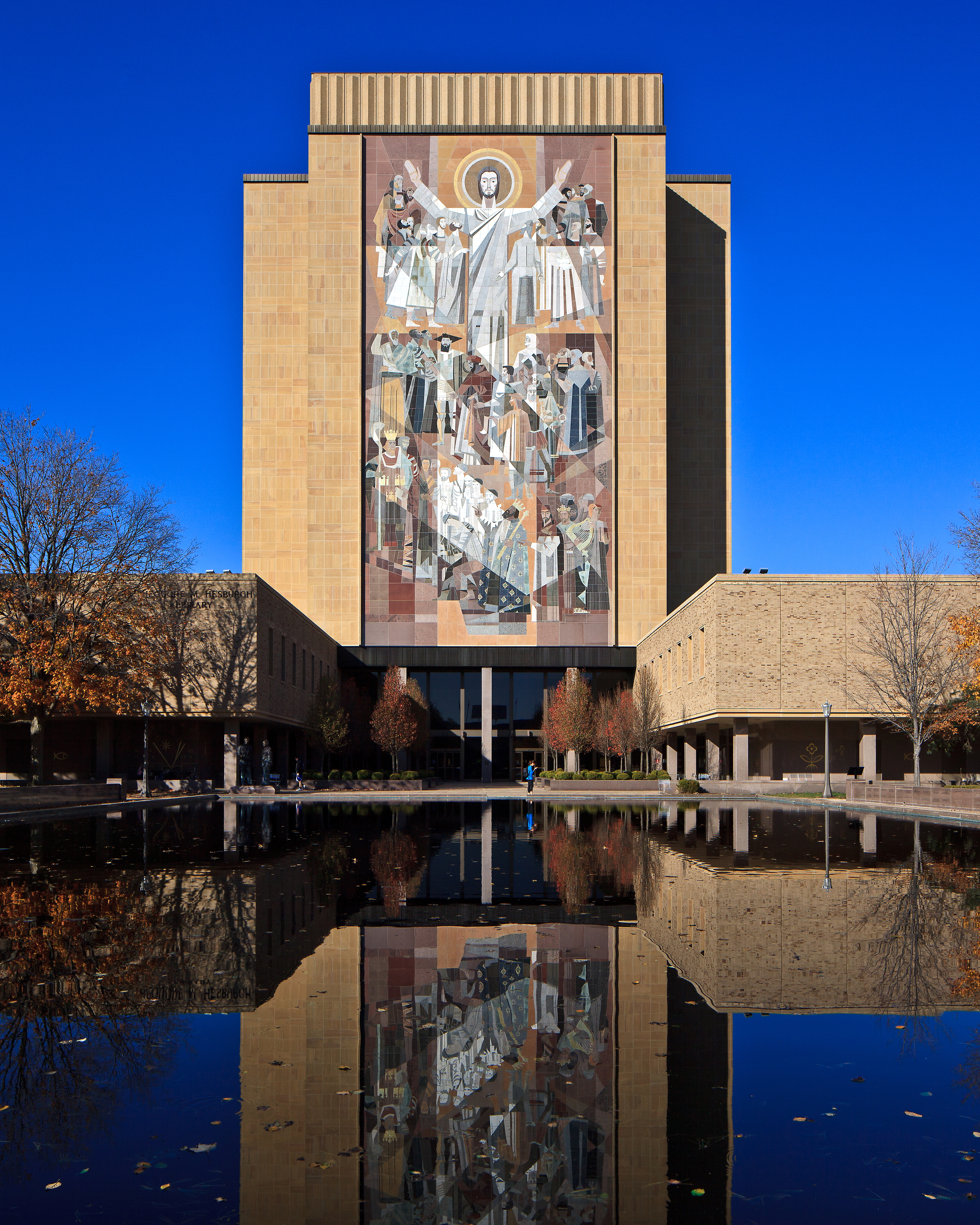
- The Hesburgh Library, the reflection pool, and the Word of Life mural
- 41°42′09″N 86°14′03″W
- Location: Notre Dame, Indiana, United States
- Type: Academic library
- Established: September 18, 1963
- Branch of: Hesburgh Libraries
- Branches: 9

Collection
- Size: 3 million+ books 3 million+ microform units 34,000+ electronic titles 28,850+ audiovisual items

Access and use
- Access requirements: Students, faculty, and staff
- Circulation: 329,511
- Population served: 14,000

Other information
- Budget: $27 million
- Director: Margaret Meserve, Edward H. Arnold Dean, Hesburgh Libraries and University of Notre Dame Press (interim)
- Website: library.nd.edu/hesburgh

Theodore Hesburgh Library is the primary building of the University of Notre Dame's library system. The present-day building opened on September 18, 1963, as Memorial Library. In 1987, it was renamed Hesburgh Library, in honor of Rev. Theodore Hesburgh, C.S.C., who served as the university's president from 1952 to 1987. The library's exterior façade that faces the university's football stadium includes a large, 134-foot (41 m) by 68-foot (21 m) mural called Word of Life, or more commonly known as Touchdown Jesus. As of 2009, the library ranked as the 61st largest collection among research universities in the United States, with an estimated 3.39 million volumes.

== History ==
=== Early libraries ===
Before the establishment of a library for students, students took the initiative to establish literary societies that served as the source of literature and discussion of scholarly topics. The first one was the St. Aloysius Literary Society, which was founded in 1850 and six years later established the first student library. It was followed by the Aloysius Philodemics, the Philopatrians and the St Edwards Library Society.

The first circulating library at Notre Dame was created in 1873 by President Rev. Augustus Lemonnier and incorporated the previously existing student libraries. It was housed on the third floor of the Main Building, and its first librarian was Jimmie Edwards, CSC. In 1879 the Main Building was destroyed by fire and 500 books were lost. After the Main Building was rebuilt, a new library was established with a budget of $500 and comprised 16,000 volumes. In 1888, during the golden jubilee of Fr. Edward Sorin, a new library was opened on the third floor. By 1900, it contained 52,000 books. In 1907 the university hired Florence Espy, a professional librarian, to catalog the collection. After the death of Edwards, Paul Foik came to Notre Dame in 1912 and took over his positions; he pushed for the construction of a library building.

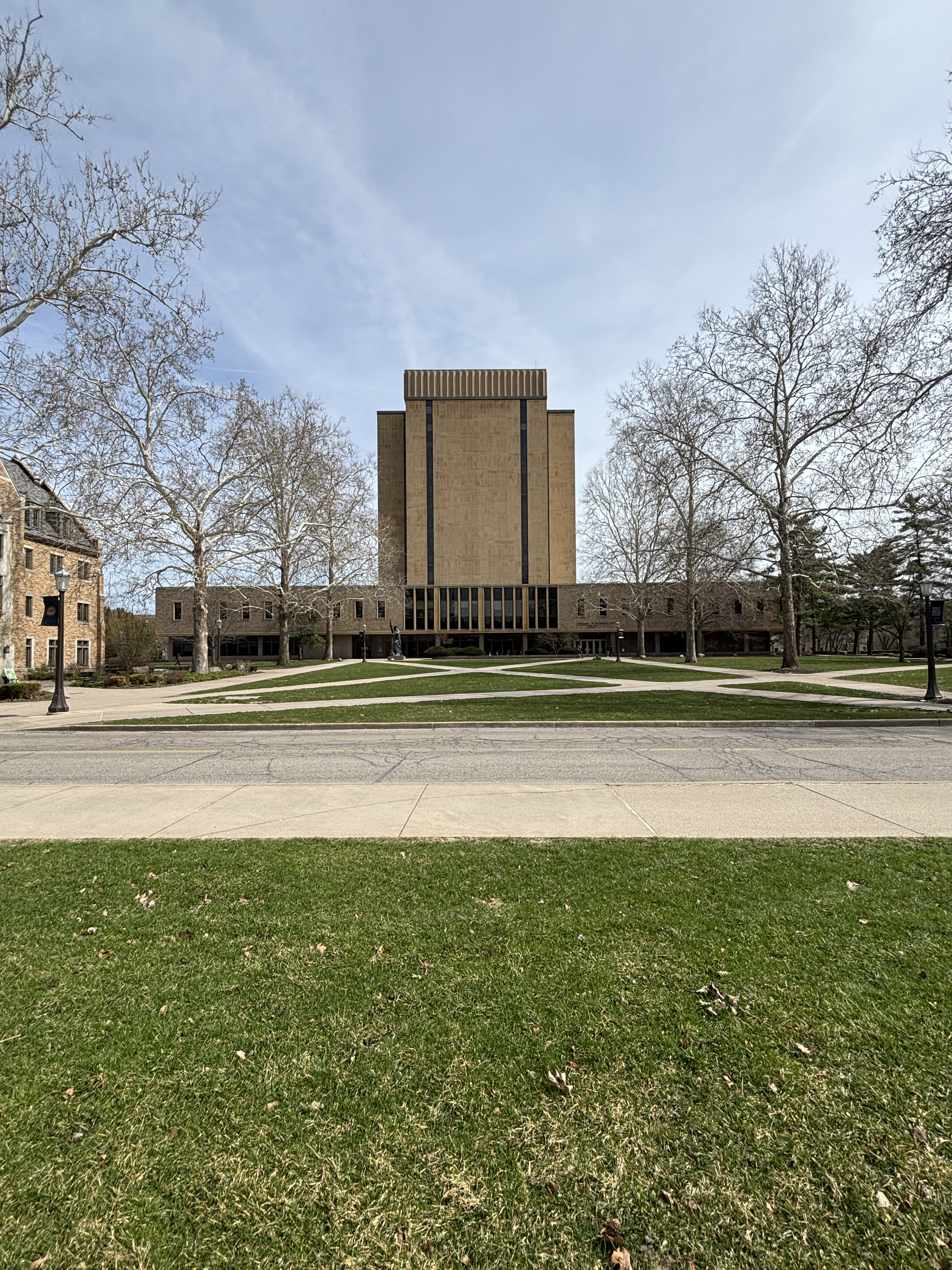
View of the Hesburgh Library from the west.

A new building (the present-day Bond Hall) to house the library was built in 1917 and was dedicated during the university's 75th anniversary. By 1920, its collection reached 103,000 volumes. The library uses the Library of Congress classification system. Thematic collections were established in other buildings in subsequent decades. A separate engineering library opened in 1933, followed by a biology library in 1938, the Medieval Institute in 1946, and the Nieuwland science library for chemistry, physics, and mathematics in 1953.

=== Current library ===
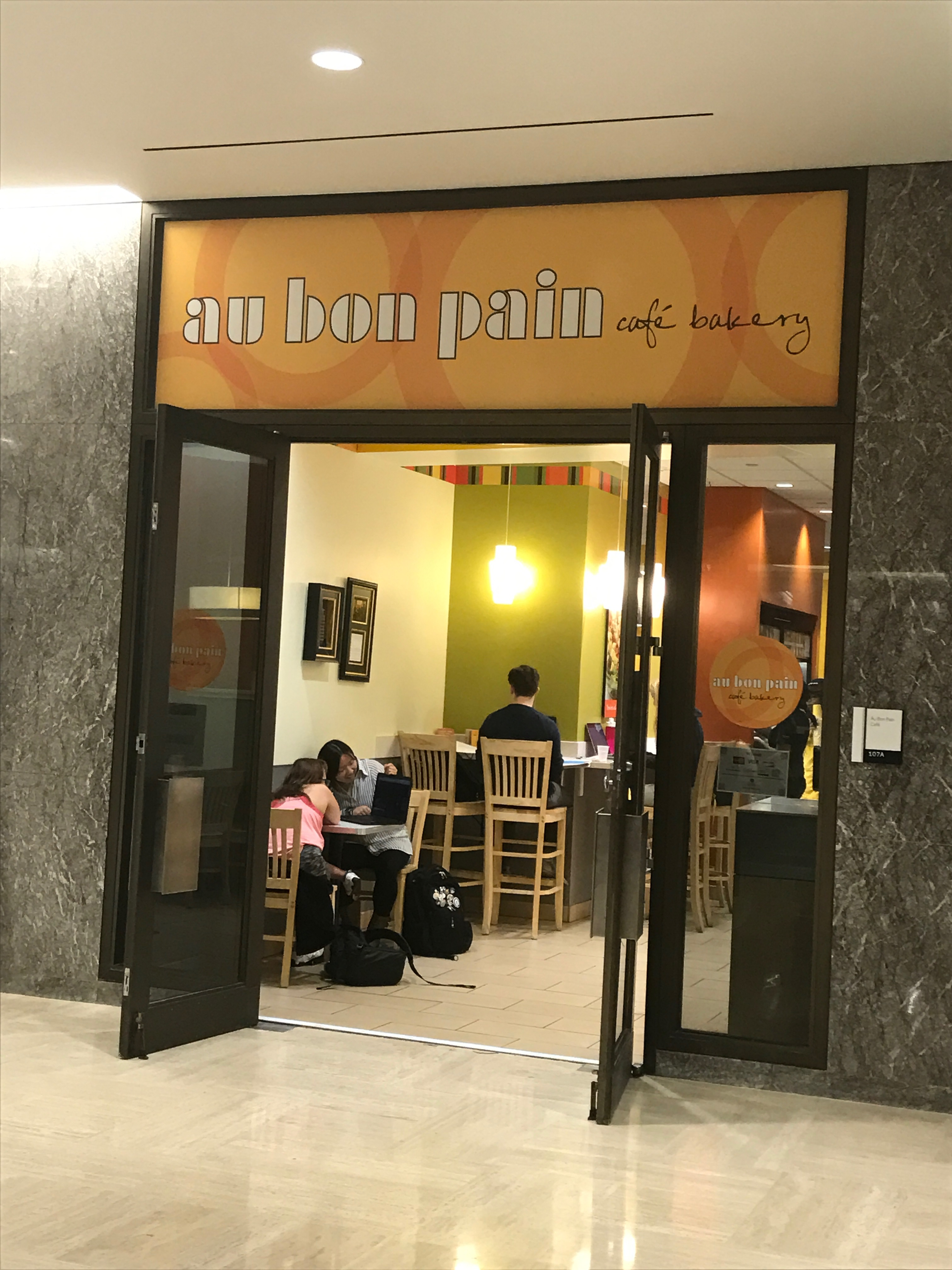
An Au Bon Pain at the Hesburgh Library, University of Notre Dame

As president of the university, Father Theodore Hesburgh was focused on raising the academic excellence of the institution, which to that time had been heavily reliant mostly on its athletic fame. The Hesburgh administration launched a series of grand fundraising campaigns, the first of which was the 1958 "Program for the Future", aimed to raise $66.6 million over ten years. Among its top priorities were two graduate residence halls, money for student aid, and faculty and administration development. The highest priority was the new library to supplant the old and small library, which Hesburgh believed to be out of date and no longer adequate for the academic goals of the university. The campaign was greatly helped by a 6 million dollar grant from the Ford Foundation.

In 1959, Father Theodore Hesburgh announced plans for construction of a new library, which he believed to be the necessary next step towards greater academic achievement. The announcement and subsequent fundraising campaigns placed emphasis that the new library would be on par with the nation's top universities by number of books and resources and would play a role in raising the profile Notre Dame among the great American universities.

Initially, the new library was intended to be in the Main Building by converting part of that structure to that purpose. Several plans proposed the destruction of the Main Building with the exception of the golden dome and the statue atop of it, which would be integrated into the new modern library building. Eventually, the limitations of these designs and the opposition of alumni to the destruction of the golden dome atop main building forced the administration to look for a different location. Eventually, in June 1960, the administration and trustees decided to place the new library building on the eastern edge of the campus because this was the direction in which the university was expanding. This necessitated the destruction of an old gymnasium and of Vetville, which housed married graduate students.

Ground was broken in 1961, with the Ellerbe Company of Saint Paul, Minnesota as the project's architect. Construction took three years. The Memorial Library officially opened on September 18, 1963.

The finished structure, which is 210 feet (64 m) tall, is built on a site that encompasses 315 square feet (29.3 m^{2}). The interior of 429,780 square feet (39,928 m^{2}) has two lower floors that serve as a base for a narrower and nearly windowless 13-story tower capped with a smaller penthouse. Interior floors have few walls and are supported by bare columns to create a flexible space to arrange stacks of books. The size of the windows was minimized to reduce glare and avoid uneven light from the outside. The two lower floors feature a more extensive use of glass, as well as brick and tweed granite, while the upper floors are finished in Makato stone.

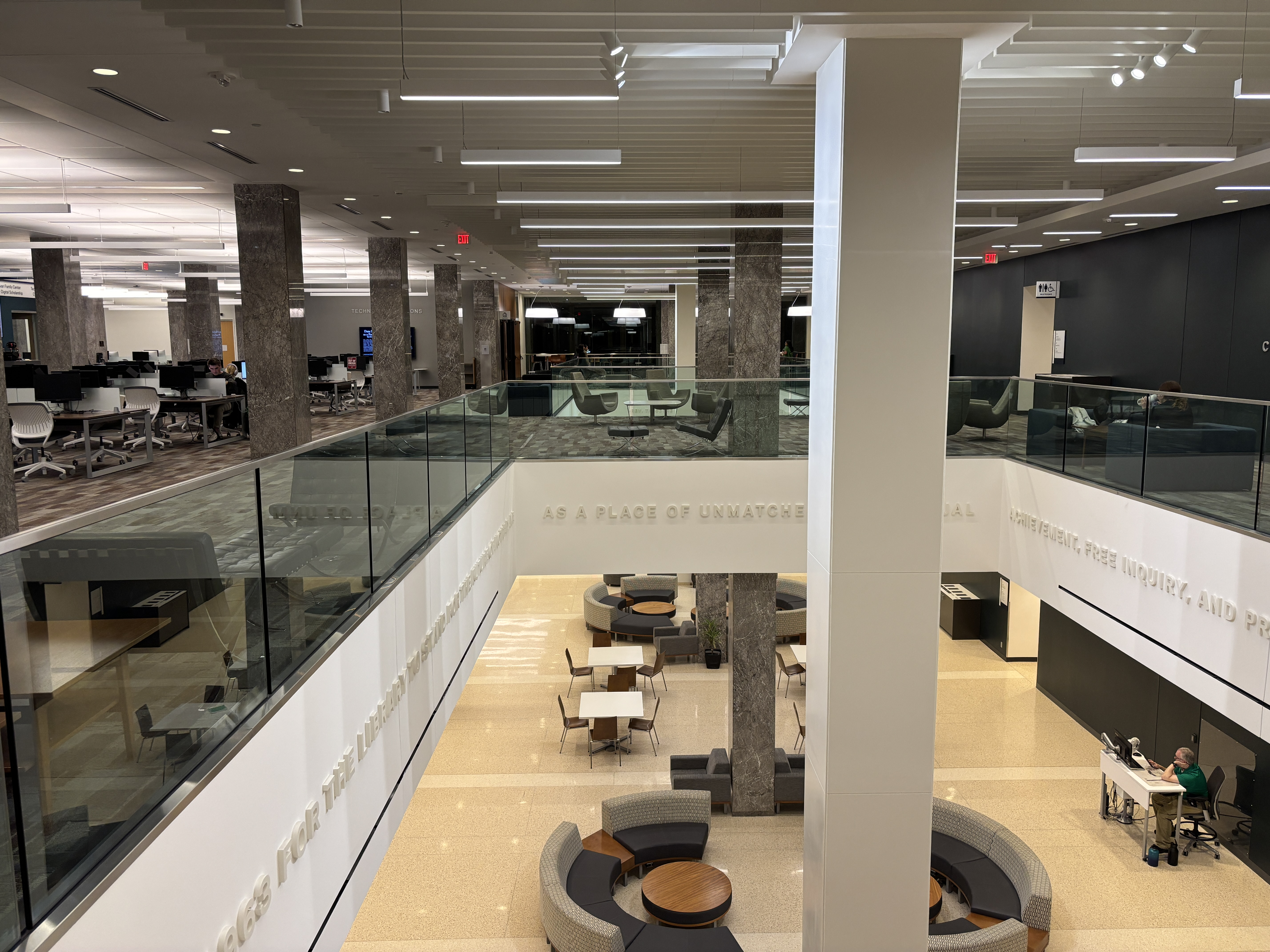
Removals from the second floor of the Hesburgh Library allow the first floor to be seen.

The library's collection reached one million volumes in 1970 and surpassed 1.5 million volumes in 1986. In 1987 the library was renamed The Hesburgh Library in honor of Fr. Hesburgh, the university's retiring president, who had served as Notre Dame's president for thirty-five years (1952–1987) and who spearheaded the new library project. In his retirement, Hesburgh maintained an office on the library's thirteenth floor overlooking the Main Quad.

As of 2009, the library housed 3.39 million volumes. The Association of Research Libraries ranked it the 61st largest collection among research universities in the United States.

In 2015, the university began major renovations to the library that were intended to modernize its interior design.
