= Statue of Knute Rockne =

Statue in Notre Dame, Indiana, U.S.

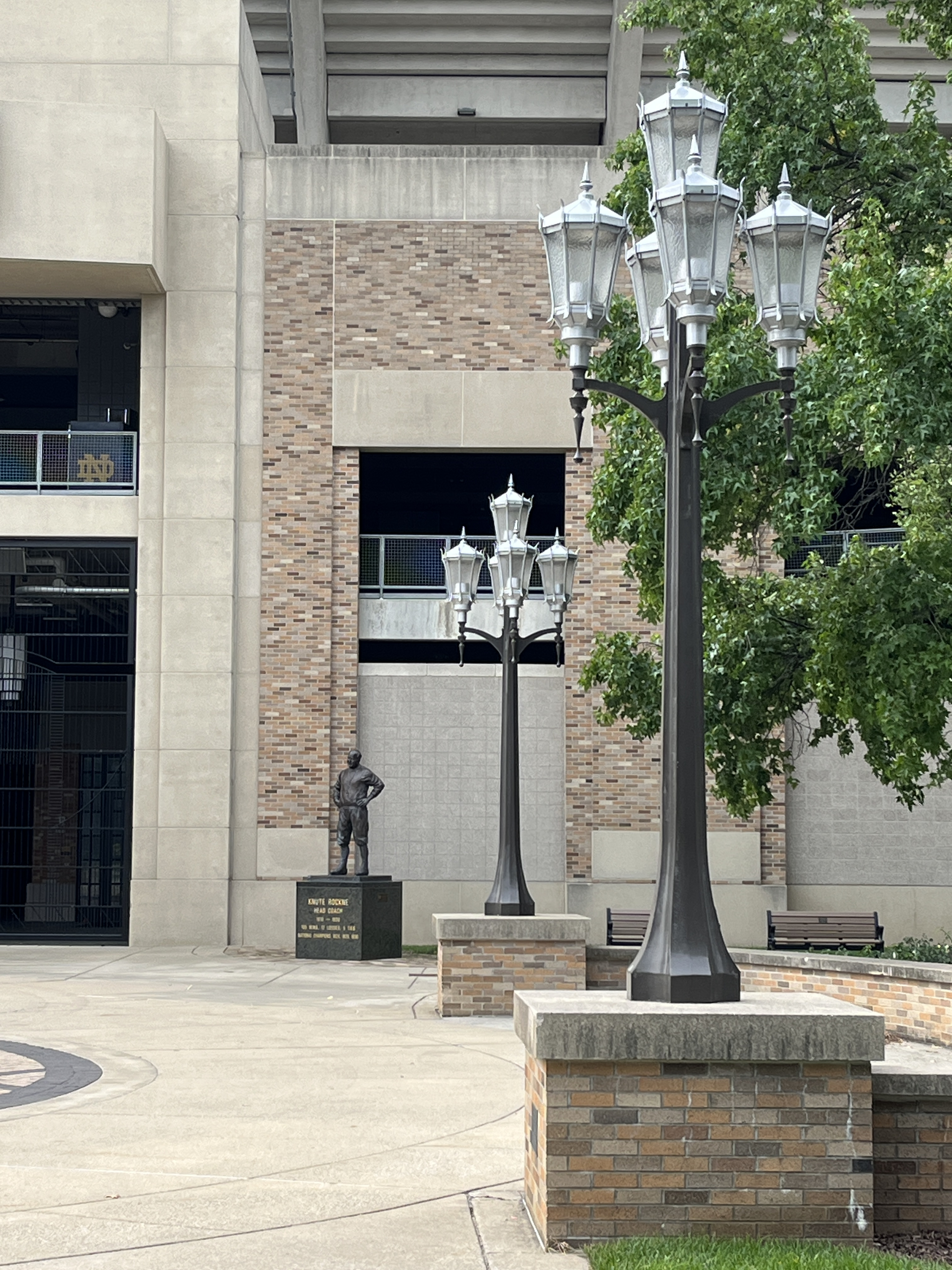
- The statue outside Notre Dame Stadium in 2023
- Subject: Knute Rockne
- Location: 41°41′58.6″N 86°14′2.8″W

A bronze sculpture of Knute Rockne is installed on the University of Notre Dame campus, in Notre Dame, Indiana. The statue was dedicated in 2009.

== See also ==
- 2009 in art
