= Irish Guard =

Irish Guard may refer to:

- Irish Guard (Notre Dame), part of the marching band at University of Notre Dame football games
- Irish Guards, regiment of the British Army
- Garda Síochána, police force in Ireland whose members are colloquially called "guards"
