= Dillon Hall =

Residence hall at the University of Notre Dame

- Arms: Argent a lion passant between three Ds Gules.
- Campus quad: South
- Established: 1931
- Named for: Patrick Dillon
- Colors: Red and black
- Gender: Male
- Rector: Fr. Edward Dolphin, C.S.C.
- Undergraduates: 332
- Postgraduates: 2 (serving as Assistant Rectors)
- Chapel: Saint Patrick
- Mascot: Big Red
- Sports: Baseball, basketball, bowling, cross country, dodgeball, football, golf, hockey, lacrosse, racquetball, soccer, table tennis, tennis, volleyball
- Charities: Hannah and Friends
- Major events: Milkshake Mass, Stache Bash
- Website: http://www.nd.edu/~dillon/
- Dillon Hall
- U.S. Historic district – Contributing property
- Location within Indiana
- Location: Notre Dame, Indiana
- Coordinates: 41°41′58″N 86°14′25″W
- Built: 1931
- Architect: Maginnis and Walsh
- Architectural style: Collegiate Gothic
- Part of: University of Notre Dame: Main and South Quadrangles (ID78000053)
- Added to NRHP: May 23, 1978

Dillon Hall is one of the 33 Residence Halls on the campus of the University of Notre Dame and one of the 17 male dorms. It is located directly west of Alumni Hall, which Dillon acquired in 1988, and is directly adjacent to South Dining Hall on the west. Dillon was built in 1931 and renovated for the 2020–2021 school year and many of the first floor rooms were converted to living and study areas. It is named after Patrick Dillon, CSC, the second president of the university. The coat of arms is taken from the Dillon family. Together with other historic structures of the university, it is on the National Register of Historic Places.

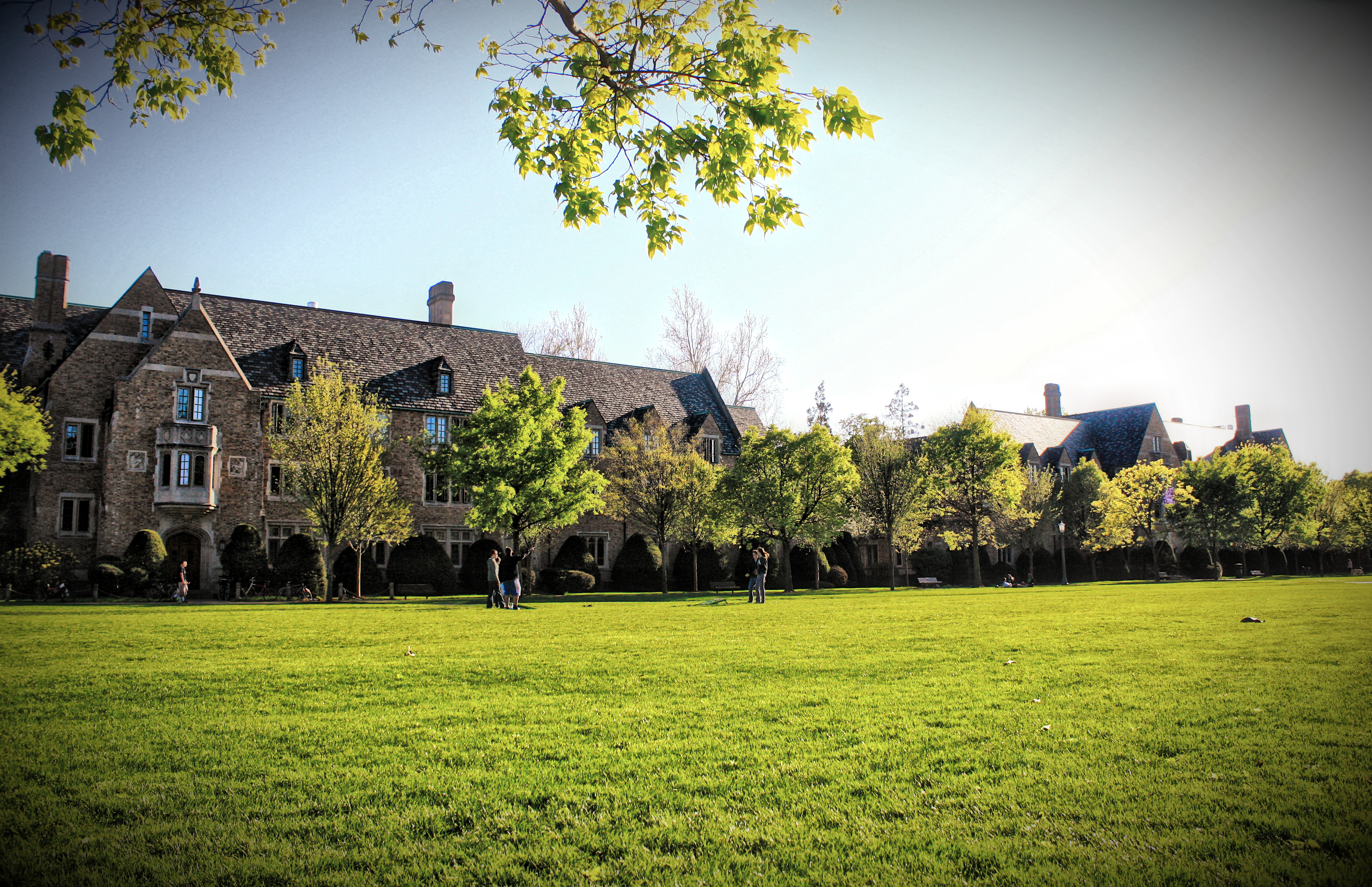
Dillon Hall

== History ==
Construction of Dillon and Alumni was part of an extensive building program that started in the mid 20s and aimed at improving educational and living facilities, and increasing supply of on-campus residential facilities. The two dorms were expected to cost $850,000 and add host 500 students to reduce the housing shortage and increase on-campus students to 2,600. Ground was broken on March 2, 1931, and construction was contracted to Sollitt and Sons. Funds were collected through the Alumni Association and a $250,000 gift from the General Education Board. An additional $52,000 came from the 1925 Rose Bowl.

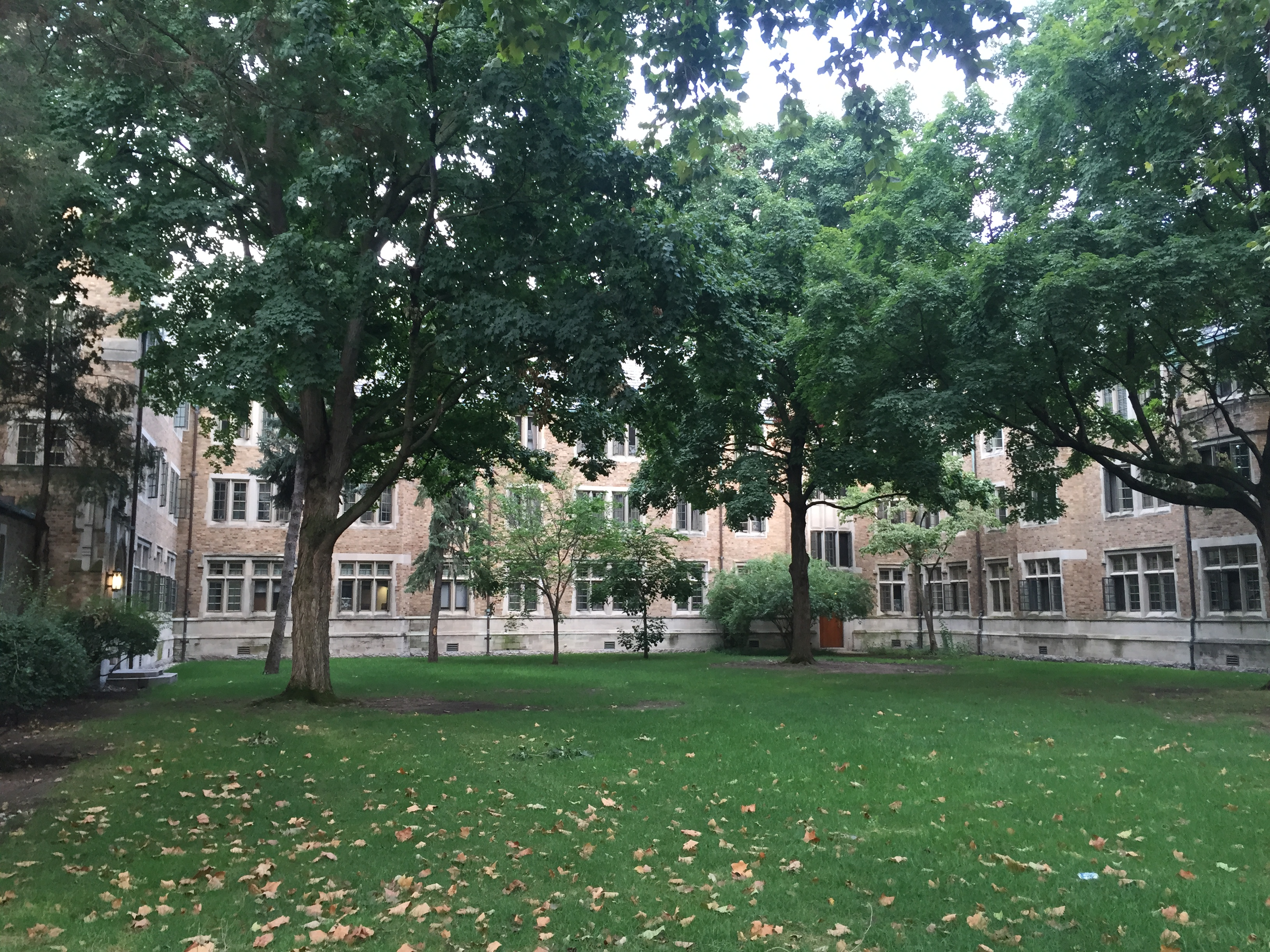
The courtyard between Dillon and Alumni Hall

Both halls were designed in 1931 by architects Charles Donagh Maginnis and Timothy Walsh in Collegiate Gothic style. The Maginnis & Walsh was known at the time for its innovative and refined gothic design of churches and campuses in Boston, and was behind the campus architecture of Boston College and the Basilica of the National Shrine of the Immaculate Conception. The architectural style of both Dillon and Alumni was in line with the previous gothic building on campus by Kervick and Fagan such as Morrissey, with local yellow brick with limestone trimmings, adorned with stone carvings on the facade and the interiors. The exterior features carvings of saints and athletes. The building is decorated with four statues by Rev. John J. Bednar, CSC, depicting St. Jerome and St. Augustine (west court), Cardinal Newman (above the southwest entrance), and St. Patrick (south wall), and a statue of Commodore Barry (located in the west court) by Hungarian sculptor Eugene Kormendi, who was sculptor in residence at Notre Dame. Dillon's chapel is dedicated to St. Patrick, namesake of Patrick Dillon, and a side altar is dedicated to St. Olaf, in honor of Knute Rockne, of Norwegian ancestry, who had passed just before the construction of the hall. When the halls opened in early November 1931 and three hundred freshmen moved in, the Dillon featured some of the latest technologies of the time, such as electric elevators, extension phones, buzzers, and slots for used razors. The first rector was Rev. Patrick Haggerty, class of 1916.

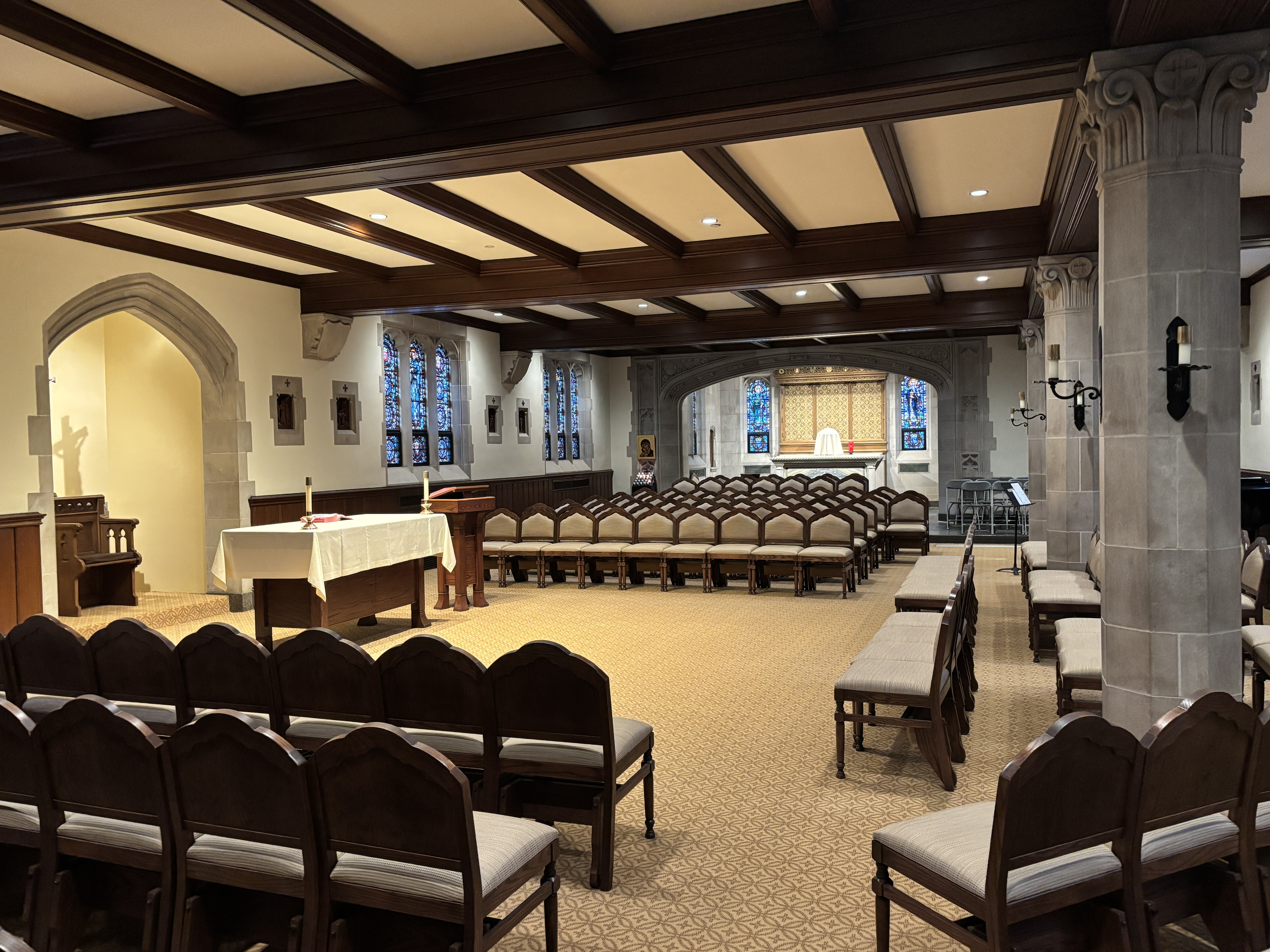
St. Patrick Chapel in Dillon Hall

The dormitory was named after Fr. Patrick Dillon, a Notre Dame graduate who was only 33 years old in 1865 when he was named the university's second president. This continued a long tradition of naming residence halls after previous presidents. Additionally, the hall was built one hundred year after his birth. He was considered lenient in disciplinary matters, a trait that made him popular among students but that had him removed from the administration only one year in his tenure. Since previous newest residential development of Howard Hall, Morrissey Hall, and Lyons Hall (built in 1924–1927) had previously been known as "Gold Coast" because of their refined architecture, Alumni and Dillon quickly were dubbed "Platinum Coast" both because they had improved amenities but also because of the grayer color of the architecture and decoration.

During World War II, Dillon and Alumni housed officers for the V-12 Navy College Training Program.

In 1965, together with Farley and Alumni, it was the first dorm to try the "stay-hall" system, in which residents could stay all four years in the same hall rather than being divided by class as they were up until the 1960s.

Past rectors include Mark L. Poorman and Daniel R. Jenky, who later was rector of the Basilica of the Sacred Heart and Bishop of the Diocese of Peoria.

== Traditions ==
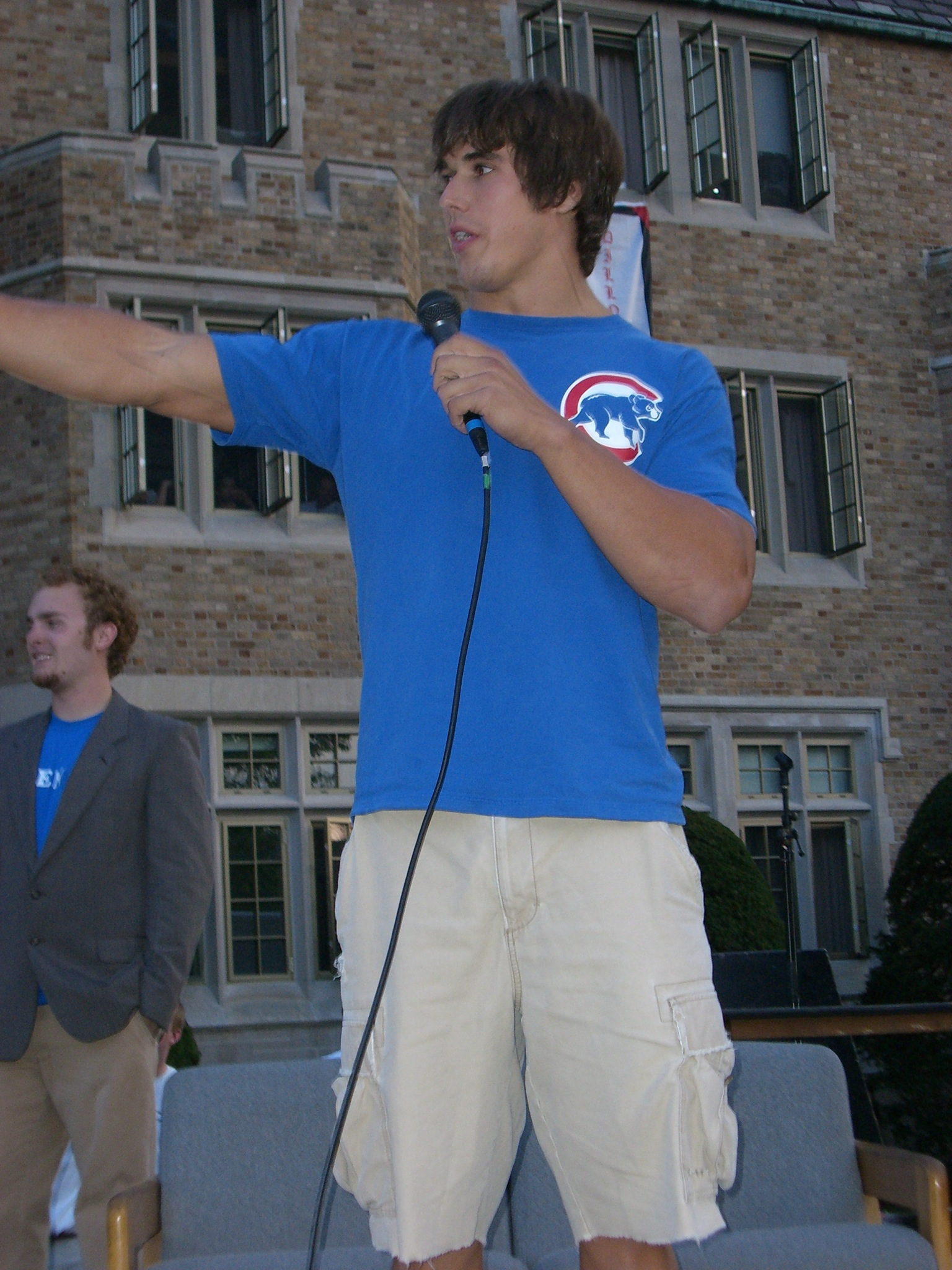
Brady Quinn at the Dillon Hall pep rally

Dillon's signature event of every year was formerly the Dillon Hall Pep Rally now called the Rockne Rally, hosted on South Quad on the Thursday preceding the first home game. The pep rally was a comedy/variety show performed outside of Dillon the Thursday before the first home football game of the fall. Dillon's current signature event is Opening Day, a wiffle ball tournament between the sections of Dillon. The hall gives out free food, as well as hosts games and activities in the courtyard between Dillon and South Dining Hall. Dillon's other major events are Milkshake Mass and the Big Red Dog Dance with Alumni Hall. Alumni Hall is the traditional rival of Dillon.

== Notable residents ==
- Victor Abiamiri
- John Burgee, architect
- John Carney
- Tom Carter
- Robert Costa, journalist
- John Covington
- Patrick Creadon, filmmaker Catholics vs. Convicts
- George Dohrmann – Pulitzer Prize winner for beat reporting in 2000
- Phil Donahue, media personality
- Marc Edwards
- Anthony Fasano
- D. J. Fitzpatrick
- Jim Flanigan
- Jack Boyle
- Mike Golic
- Christopher W. Grady
- Paul Hornung – the "Golden Boy," 1956 Heisman Trophy winner, number one overall draft pick in the 1957 NFL draft, and member of four NFL Championship teams with the Green Bay Packers
- Bill Laimbeer - won two NBA Championships and was named to the NBA All-Star Game four times while playing with the Detroit Pistons
- Derek Landri
- Trevor Laws
- Jeremiyah Love, football player
- Michael Madigan, politician
- John Mooney, basketball player
- Tony Peterson
- Romeo Okwara
- Regis Philbin, television personality
- Thomas W. Powers
- Brady Quinn
- Tony Rice – quarterback on the 1988 National Championship team; in 1989 he won the Johnny Unitas Golden Arm Award, finished 4th in the Heisman voting, and was named to the All-American Team
- Richard Riehle '70
- John Sullivan – football player
- Manti Te'o

== Gallery ==
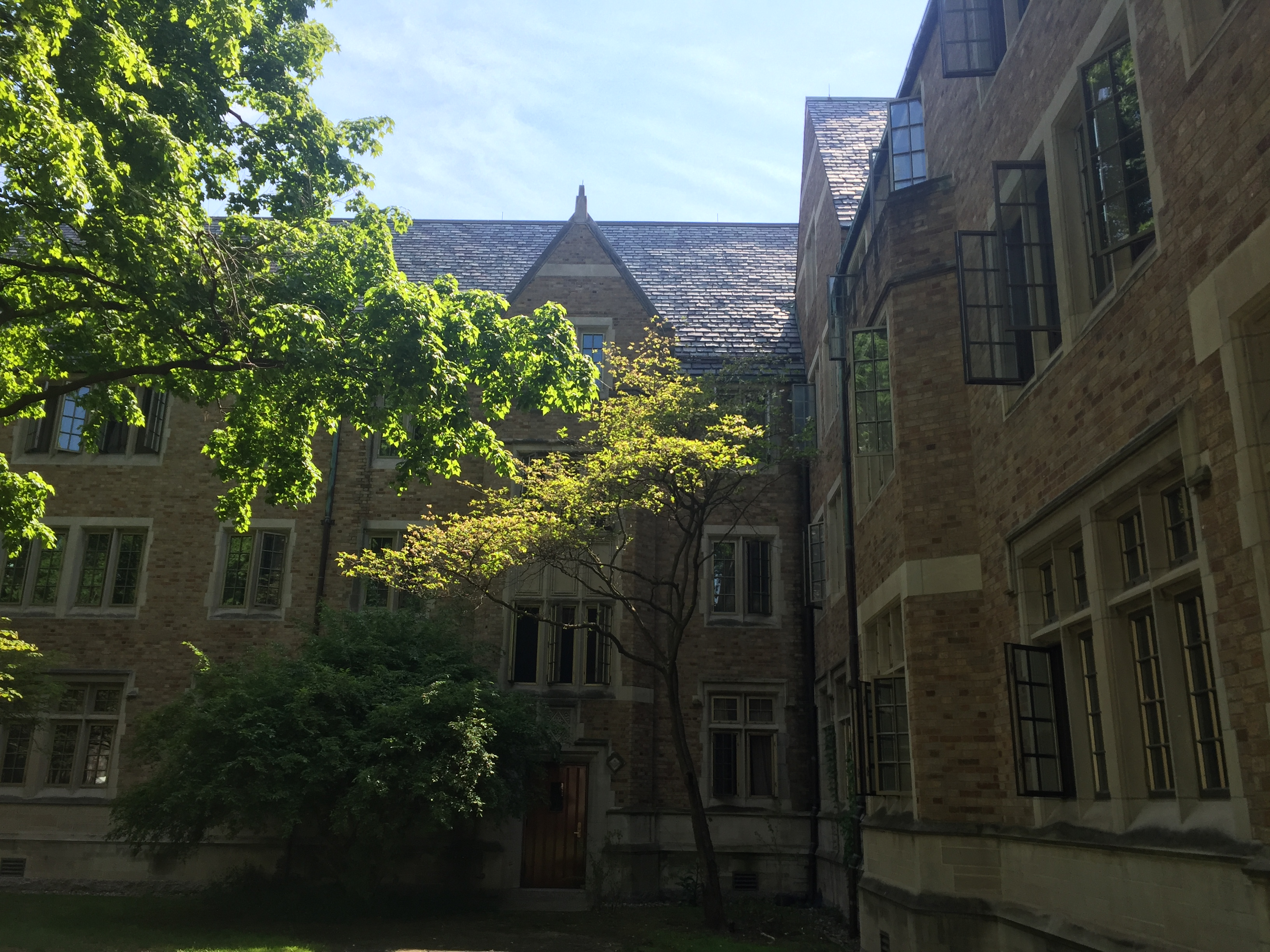
Dillon Hall side

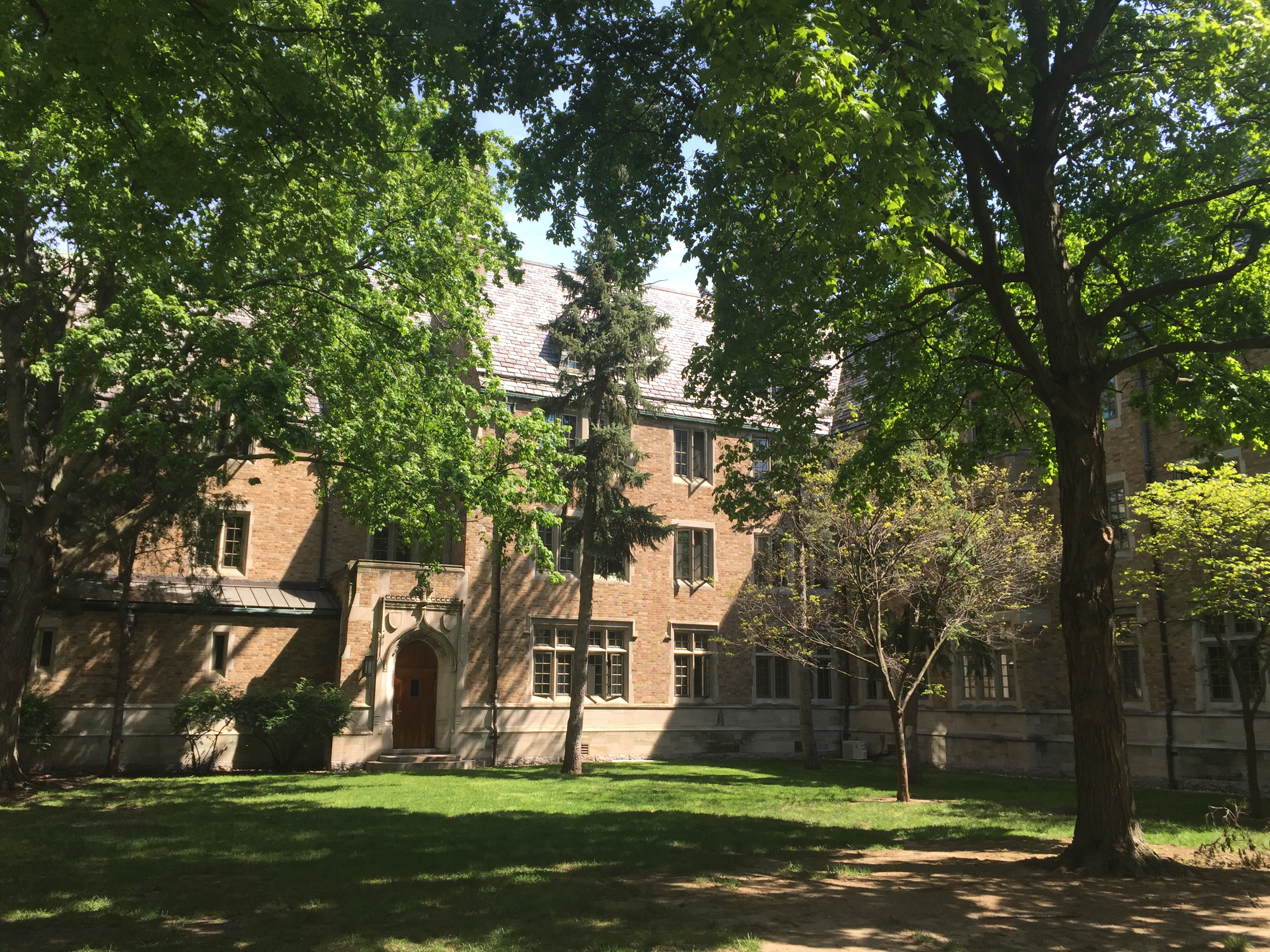
The courtyard between Dillon and Alumni

Dillon Hall's main entrance

== Sources ==
- Hall Profile
