= Eugene Kormendi =

Hungarian sculptor

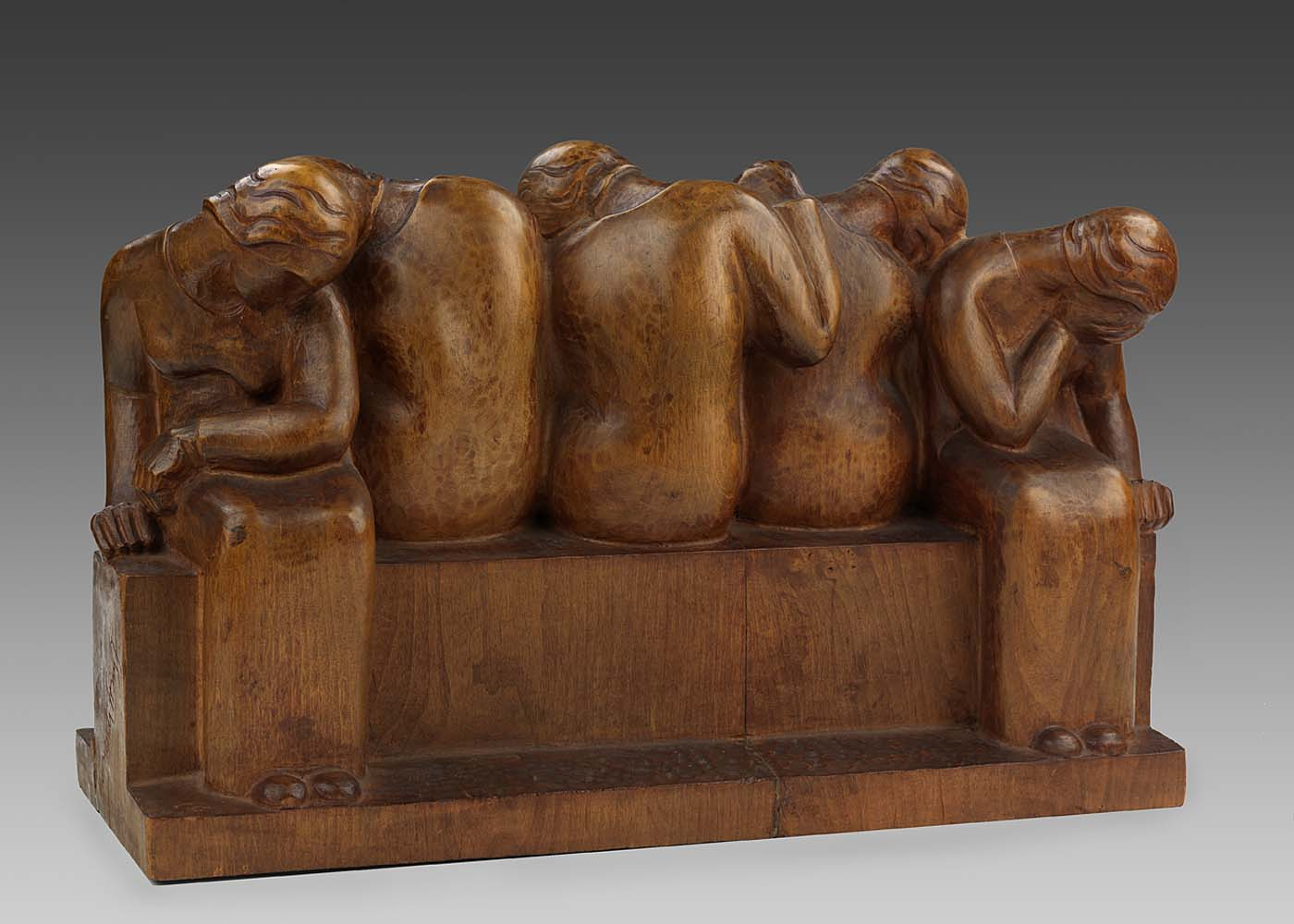
- "Figure Group" on display at the Smithsonian American Art Museum
- Born: 16 October 1889; Hungary
- Died: 14 August 1959 (aged 69)
- Education: Academy of Budapest
- Known for: Sculpture

Eugene Kormendi (1889–1959) was a Hungarian sculptor. He studied at the Academy of Budapest before moving to Paris to collaborate with Auguste Rodin and Jean Paul Lorenz. Kormendi first came to the United States in 1939 along with his wife, Elizabeth, to attend the New York World's fair. The outbreak of World War II prevented him from returning to Europe, hence he stayed in the United States to pursue his career. Starting in 1947, he was sculptor in residence at the University of Notre Dame until the end of his career.

== List of Works ==
- Turkish Hungarian monument, Jászberény, 1909,
- 0 kilométerkő Madonna, Budapest, 1932 (destroyed during World War II)
- Monument to Heroes who died in World War I, Geszt, 1937,
- World War I memorial, Balassagyarmat, 1937
- University of Notre Dame
  - "St. Thomas More", "Christ the King" – Notre Dame Law School
  - "The Graduate" – Alumni Hall
  - "Commodore Barry" – Dillon Hall
  - "St. Joseph with Lilly" – Lyons Hall
  - "St. Andrew" – Morrissey Hall
  - "St. Christopher" – Rockne Memorial
  - "The Good Shepherd"; "St. Raphael the Archangel" – St. Liam Hall Infirmary
- "Mother and Child", "Head of a young man", "Figure Group", "St. Francis of Assisi", Smithsonian American Art Museum
- World War I memorial, Seven Dolors Shrine, Valparaiso, Indiana
- Christ Light of the World, USCCB building, Washington, D.C.,

== See also ==
- TKPAGE
