= Old College, University of Notre Dame =

Undergraduate Seminary at the University of Notre Dame

Old College
- University of Notre Dame
- Established: Built 1843
- Gender: Male
- Rector: Rev. Karl Romkema, C.S.C.
- Undergraduates: 12
- Chapel: Chapel of the Holy Family, Log Chapel
- Website: Official website
- Old College
- U.S. Historic district – Contributing property
- Location: Notre Dame, Indiana
- Coordinates: 41°42′06″N 86°14′33″W
- Built: 1843
- Architect: Father Edward Sorin & Bro. Francis Patois, CSC
- Architectural style: Collegiate Gothic
- Part of: University of Notre Dame: Main and South Quadrangles (ID78000053)
- Added to NRHP: May 23, 1978

Old College, built in 1843 by the founder of the University of Notre Dame, Rev. Edward Sorin, C.S.C., and the rest of the Holy Cross brothers, is the oldest standing building on campus. Together with other historic structures of the university, it is on the National Register of Historic Places.

== History ==
When university founder Rev. Edward Sorin arrived to the site of the present campus in 1842, the only building present was the Log Chapel. Rev. Sorin had waited for the arrival of an architect, Mr. Marsile, to build a main building for his university, but the architect did not arrive until August 1843; without the support of Mr. Marsile, Sorin decided to build in the meantime this smaller structure in the spring of 1843. This simple brick building, which was ready by the fall of 1843, initially served as dormitories for the students and Holy Cross priests and brothers as well as classroom, clothing room, bakery, and dining hall. In the fall of 1843, Old College hosted the school's first five students, as well as seven more who joined in the following months.

When the priests and students moved into the new college building (the first iteration of the Notre Dame Main Building) built in the fall of 1844, Old College was converted into a residence for the Holy Cross sisters, who also worked at the university and provided the cooking and laundry for the youngest students, as well as a temporary infirmary before that also was moved to the new college building.

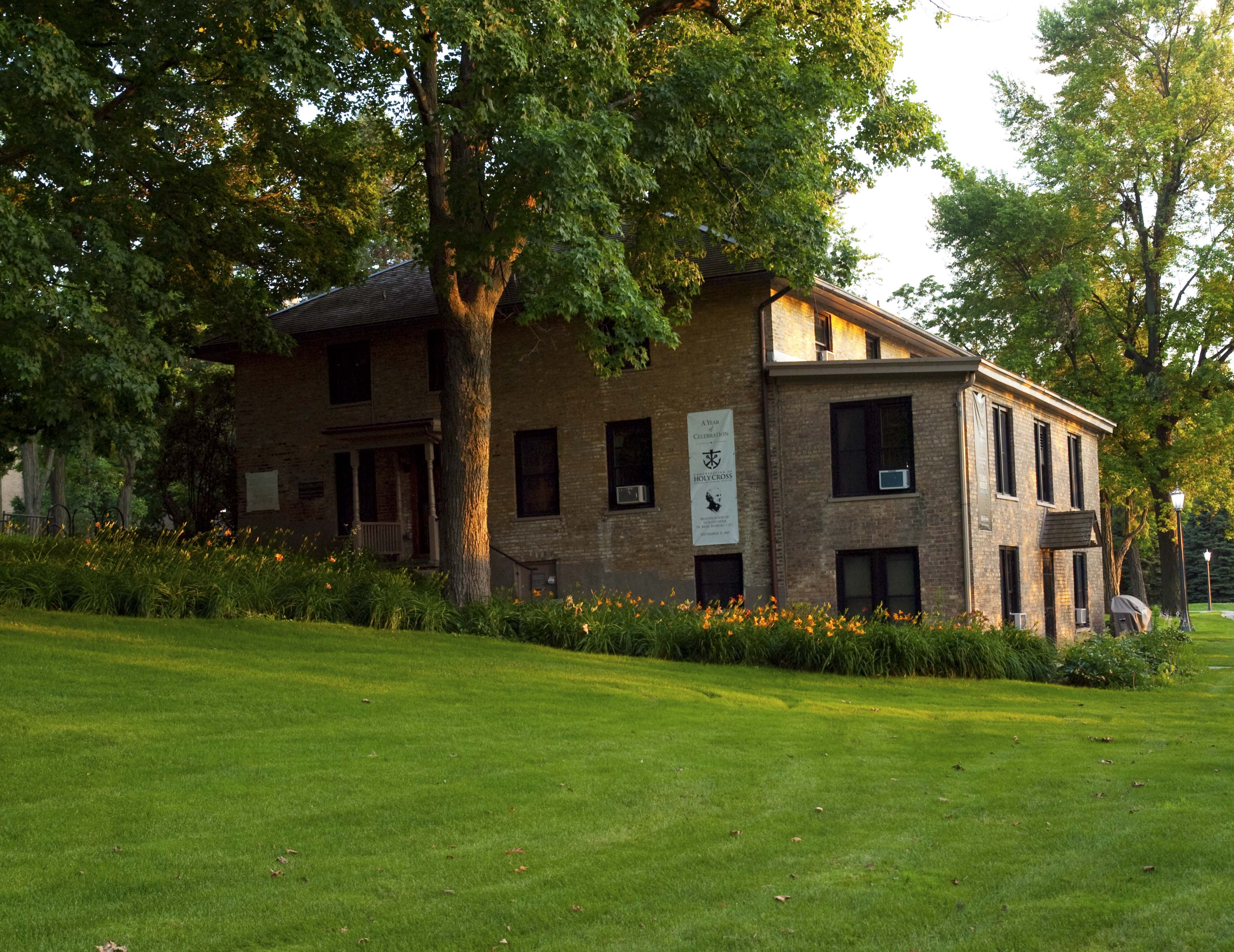
Old College at Notre Dame

In its history, it housed the Sisters of the Holy Cross, the Brothers of Holy Cross, and it was a college bakery.

Today, the undergraduate seminary for the United States Province of the Congregation of Holy Cross, Old College is open to those undergraduate men who wish to discern a call to the religious life, while at the same time working to obtain an undergraduate degree. The community combines a structured formation program with the advantages of a Notre Dame educational experience.

== Formation and academics ==
Old Collegians are introduced to religious life in Holy Cross through daily Eucharist and the Liturgy of the Hours, spiritual direction, service placements, retreats, one-on-one meetings with their chaplains, and weekly community gatherings. Their academic requirements include 30 credits of philosophy and 12 of theology, but they are free to pursue various degrees, depending upon their academic interests.

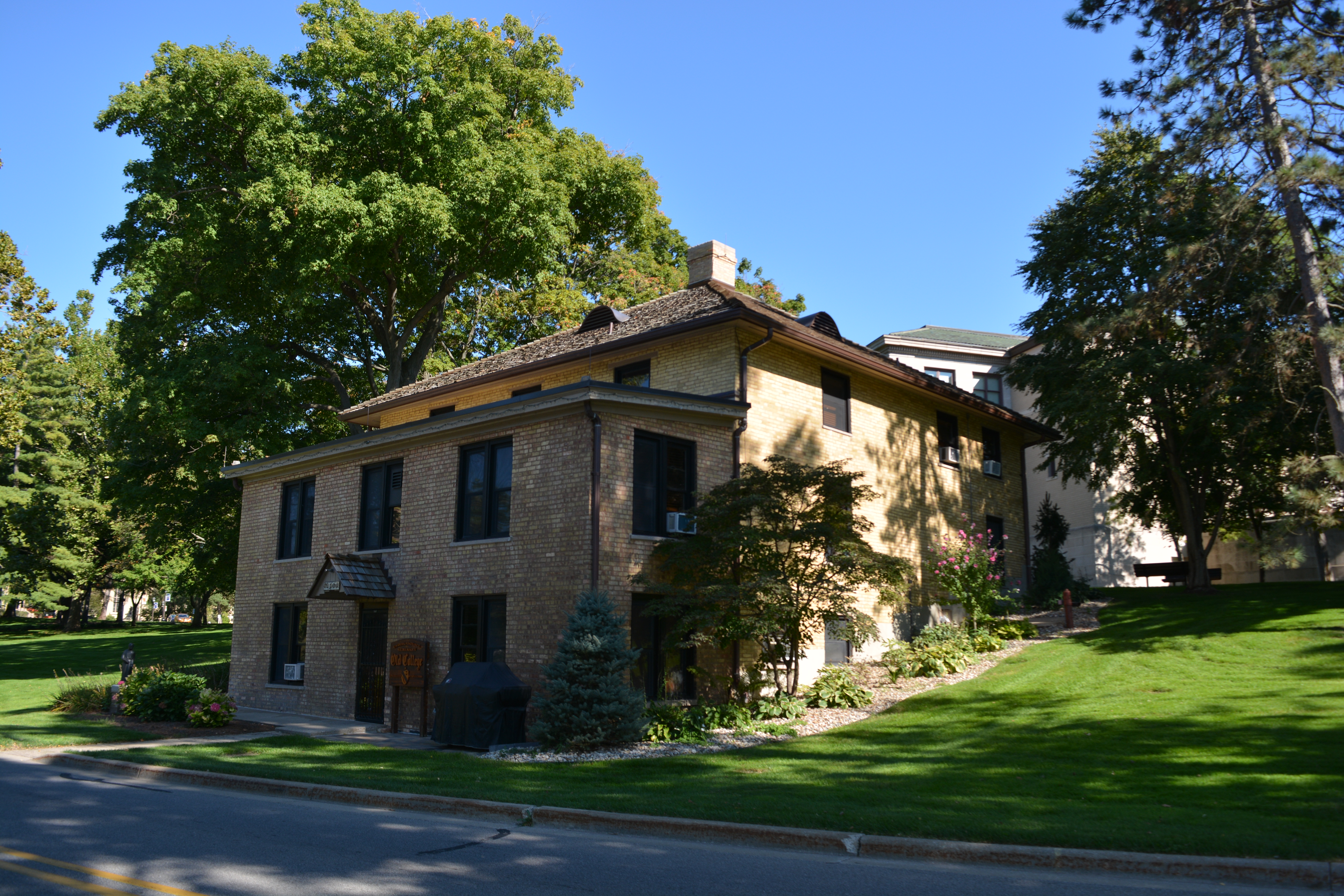
Old College

The men of Old College are actively engaged in the community life of the Holy Cross religious community on campus. In addition the Old Collegians work closely with the major seminarians at Moreau Seminary. Joint activities between the two programs include events such as the annual Eucharistic Procession, community dinners, and assisting with prayer and liturgy at the Basilica of the Sacred Heart. Old Collegians also collaborate with the older seminarians in off-campus activities such as the annual March for Life and the Mundelein Seminary basketball tournament. Men in their senior year of Old College will move into Moreau Seminary to continue their formation so these events play an important role in building brotherhood among the Holy Cross seminarians.
