= Zero Kilometre Stone =

Marker for central kilometre in Budapest

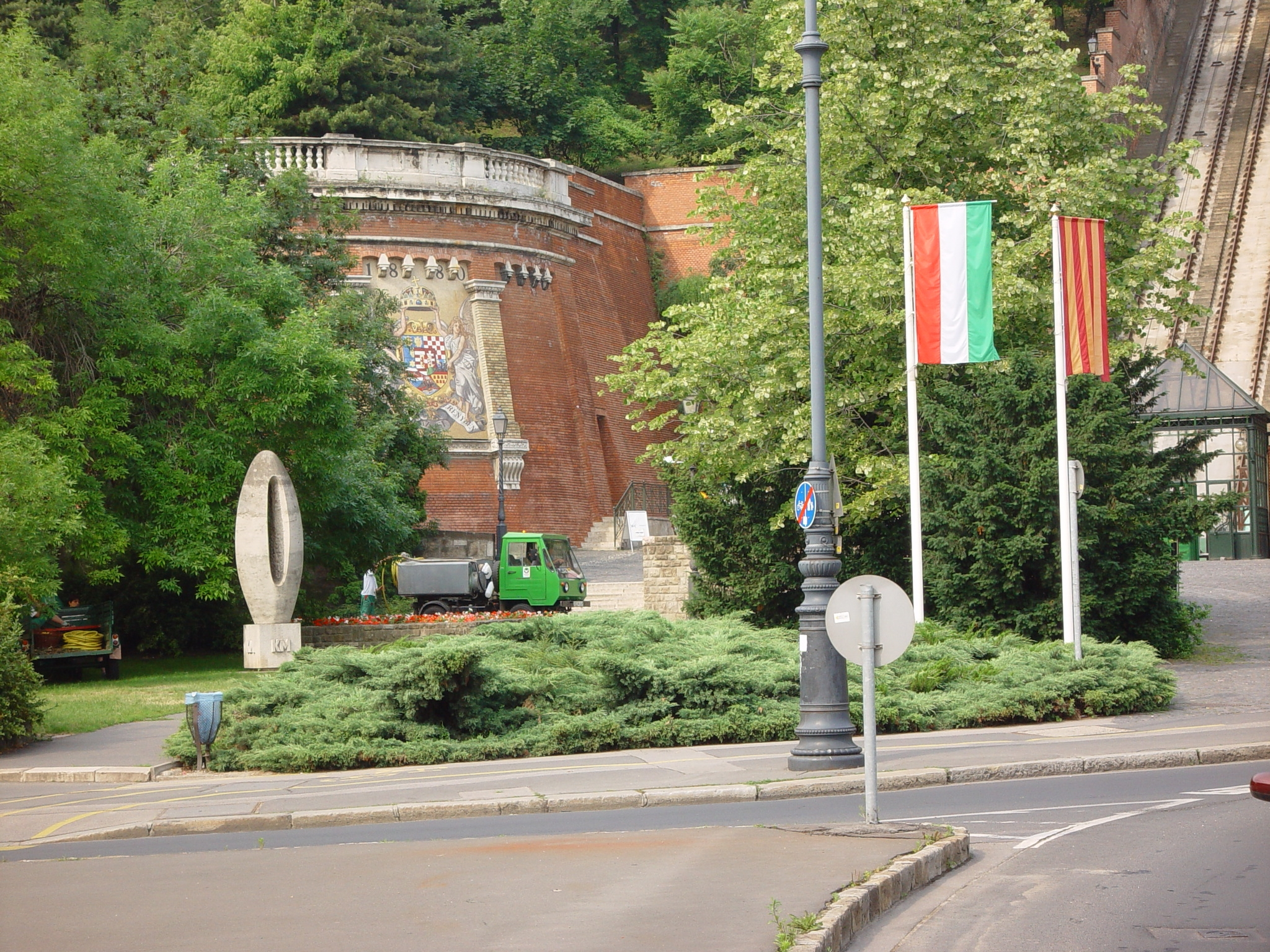
Physical location of Zero Kilometre Stone in Hungary, at the entrance of the tunnel near Lánchíd, Budapest

The Zero Kilometre Stone is a 3 m high limestone sculpture in Budapest that represents Kilometre Zero in Hungary. It consists of a zero sign, with an inscription on its pedestal reading "KM" for kilometres. It was initially located at the threshold of Buda Royal Palace, but was moved to its present location by Széchenyi Chain Bridge when the crossing was completed in 1849.

The present sculpture is the work of Miklós Borsos and was erected in 1975. The first official monument, a Madonna statue by Eugene Kormendi had been set up at this spot in 1932, but was destroyed in World War II. A second sculpture, depicting a worker, was in place from 1953 until its replacement by the current one.

== Location ==
It is located in a small park at Clark Ádám tér (Adam Clark square), at the Buda abutment of Chain Bridge, below Buda Castle.

- 47°29′53″N 19°02′24″E

== See also ==
- Zero Milestone (Washington D.C. monument)
