= Band of the Fighting Irish =

Marching band of the University of Notre Dame

- School: University of Notre Dame
- Location: Notre Dame, IN
- Conference: Independent
- Founded: 1845
- Director: Kenneth Dye
- Associate Directors: Larry Dwyer, Matt Merten, Sam Sanchez
- Assistant Directors: Emma Fell, Victoria Paspalas
- Members: 375
- Fight song: "Notre Dame Victory March"

The Band of the Fighting Irish is the marching band of the University of Notre Dame in Indiana, US. Nicknamed America's First, America's Best, the band has been in continuous existence since 1845. The band has since grown to include over 300 members, representing nearly every field of study and over 40 states. The Band of the Fighting Irish is composed of students from the University of Notre Dame, Saint Mary's College, and Holy Cross College. The band, along with the famed Irish Guard, are considered integral parts of the pageantry and legend of Notre Dame Football. Led by the eight members of the guard, the Band of the Fighting Irish has performed at every home game since the football program's founding in 1887.

== Performances ==
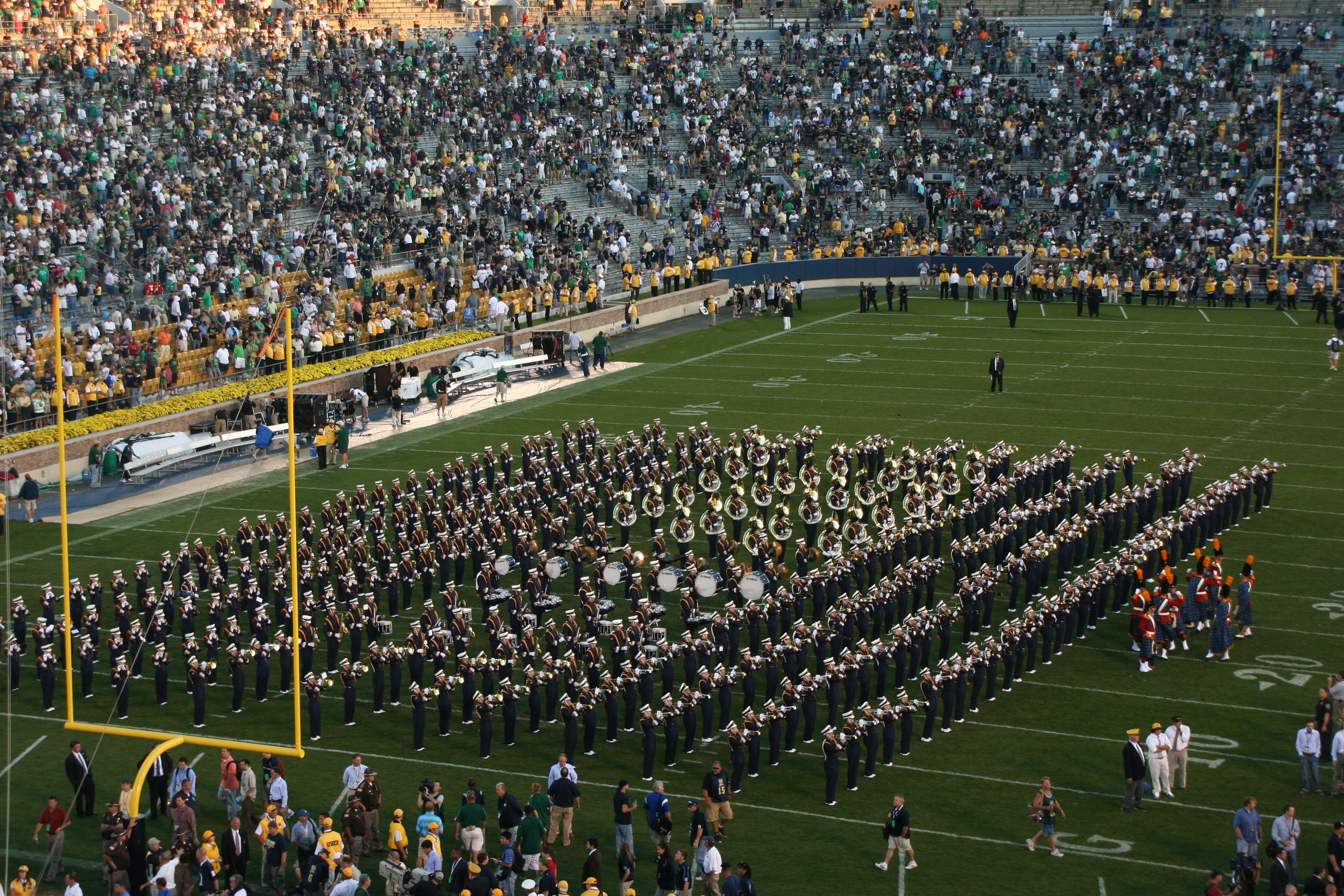
The Notre Dame Marching band performs at the end of a football game

The Band of the Fighting Irish performs at all home football games and pep rallies. A typical home game schedule commences on Friday afternoon when the band marches out from the Main Building to the Ricci Family Fields for a final run-through of their field show, to the delight of onlookers. Following practice, the band heads to the Edmund P. Joyce Center to perform for the pep rally, energizing students and fans alike. At midnight, students and fans gather in front of the main building for the energizing "Drummers' Circle" performed by the drum line to prepare the student body for the following day's events.

Saturday morning commences with an early morning march about campus as a traditional way to "wake-up" students across campus in preparation for game day festivities. Once arriving at the Loftus Indoor Sports Facility, the band practices their field show once more and thereafter convenes for lunch, often performing various songs for special banquets held in the South Dining Hall at this time.

The day continues with the traditional "Trumpets under the Dome" performance in the Main Building, and the "Concert on the Steps" at Bond Hall, the former Architecture Building, follows. During this performance, the band performs traditional tunes as well as the halftime field show music in stand-still performance, galvanizing the large crowds surrounding the building.

Next, approximately half-an-hour before kick-off, the band steps off from in front of the Main Building for their traditional march to the stadium, led by the Cheerleaders and Irish Guard, the band parades down the streets, lined by fans clapping and cheering the Irish onwards to victory.

After performing for pre-game festivities, its halftime show, and the post-game show, the band makes a triumphant march back to the band building after the game, and awaits preparations for the upcoming game day and the next opportunity to support its Fighting Irish football team.

== Composition ==
=== Instrumentation ===
With nearly 400 members each year, the band features nine main sections: trombones, drumline, piccolos, clarinets, saxophones, faltos (mellophones, or f-alto horns), baritones, basses, and trumpets. The instrumentation of the drumline is further broken down into snare drums, bass drums, tenor drums, cymbals, and mallets. The mallets include both marching xylophones and bells. The saxophone section includes alto and tenor saxophones only. Each instrument provides a vital timbre that contributes to the unique sound of the Notre Dame Band.

Glockenspiels (bells) used to march at the front of the band, and, for several years during the 1970s, 1980s and up to 1991, the rolling tympani led the band onto the field.

The band has a 10th section which consists of the band managers. These are students who help with the day to day logistics including moving equipment, assisting directors/band members, crowd control, and everything that helps the band run.

=== Irish Guard ===
Each football Saturday, the Band of the Fighting Irish is led onto the field for its traditional pre-game salute by the celebrated Irish Guard. This group of precision marchers was formed in 1949 when then Director H. Lee Hope conceived the idea of adding color to the band while maintaining the dignity befitting the nation's oldest university band. The Guard's uniform is patterned after the traditional Irish kilt.

During the first few years, the Irish Guard performed on bagpipes. Performances included a variety of Irish tunes as well as several school songs. Prior to each home football game, the Guard would perform around the concourse of the stadium, as well as other areas on campus. Performing on bagpipes was discontinued around 1963.

== Staff ==
=== Director ===
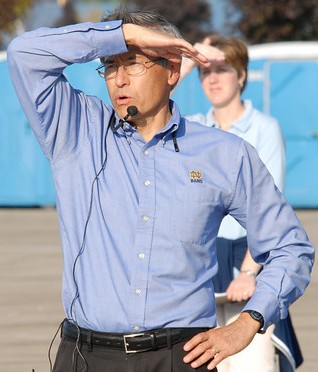
Dr. Kenneth Dye

Kenneth W. Dye is Director of Bands and Professor of Music at the University of Notre Dame. He is a graduate of the University of Houston, where he holds a Doctorate in Music Education and a Master's in Business Administration. He has also earned degrees of Master of Arts in Music from California State University and Bachelor of Music from the University of Southern California where he marched in the University of Southern California Trojan Marching Band. As a composer/arranger, Ken Dye serves as a staff writer for several publishers and served as composer/arranger for the Sydney 2000 Olympic Band and pops arranger for the Dallas Symphony. His writing activities have produced over 1200 works for band and orchestra performed throughout the U.S. and overseas. Dye's composition "Welcome to Beijing," an Olympic Suite for Band, premiered in the Beijing Concert Hall in May 2008. The Olympic Suite is also featured in the 2008 Olympic Arts Festival performed by the Beijing schools.

In addition Dye serves as a concurrent professor of Computer Applications. His course "Music through Technology" examines the historical influence of technology on the creative process of music. Dr. Dye also teaches music from a business perspective in a course entitled "The Business of Music," a synergistic history of music and business. Prior to Notre Dame, Dr Dye served as Director of Bands at Rice University for 17 years and 14 years as conductor of the Houston Concert Band. In addition to his experience in Texas, he was Director of Bands at State University of West Georgia, Assistant Band Director for the 1984 Olympics, and taught public high school at Artesia High School in Lakewood, California. He has also served as director of the Opening Ceremonies of the U.S. Olympic Festival and conductor of the All-American College Band at Disney World. Ken Dye serves as a music director of numerous special events as well as a clinician and adjudicator throughout North America and the South Pacific.

== History ==
=== "America's First, America's Best" ===
There has always been a close and affectionate tie between the Notre Dame Band and the rest of the Notre Dame community. In 1844, university founder the Rev. Edward Sorin instructed the Rev. Francoise Gouesse to teach music lessons. By 1846, the Notre Dame Cornet Band was formed and it played at the first graduation ceremony. In its first decades, the band mostly primarily at awards ceremonies, theater productions, commencement exercises and to honor students going off to war. By 1870, the band had an extensive musical repertoire. In 1871 it gave a benefit concert to raise money for victims of the Great Chicago fire. It was led through the year by Prof. Sotokase, Brother Basil, Prof. Boyne, Prof. J. O'Neill, Lilly and J. H. Gillespie, and Mr. Geo. Roulhac. The legendary football coach, Knute Rockne, played flute for Notre Dame, and former Athletic Director Edward Moose Krause spent some years studying music before putting his clarinet on the shelf and devoting himself to athletics.

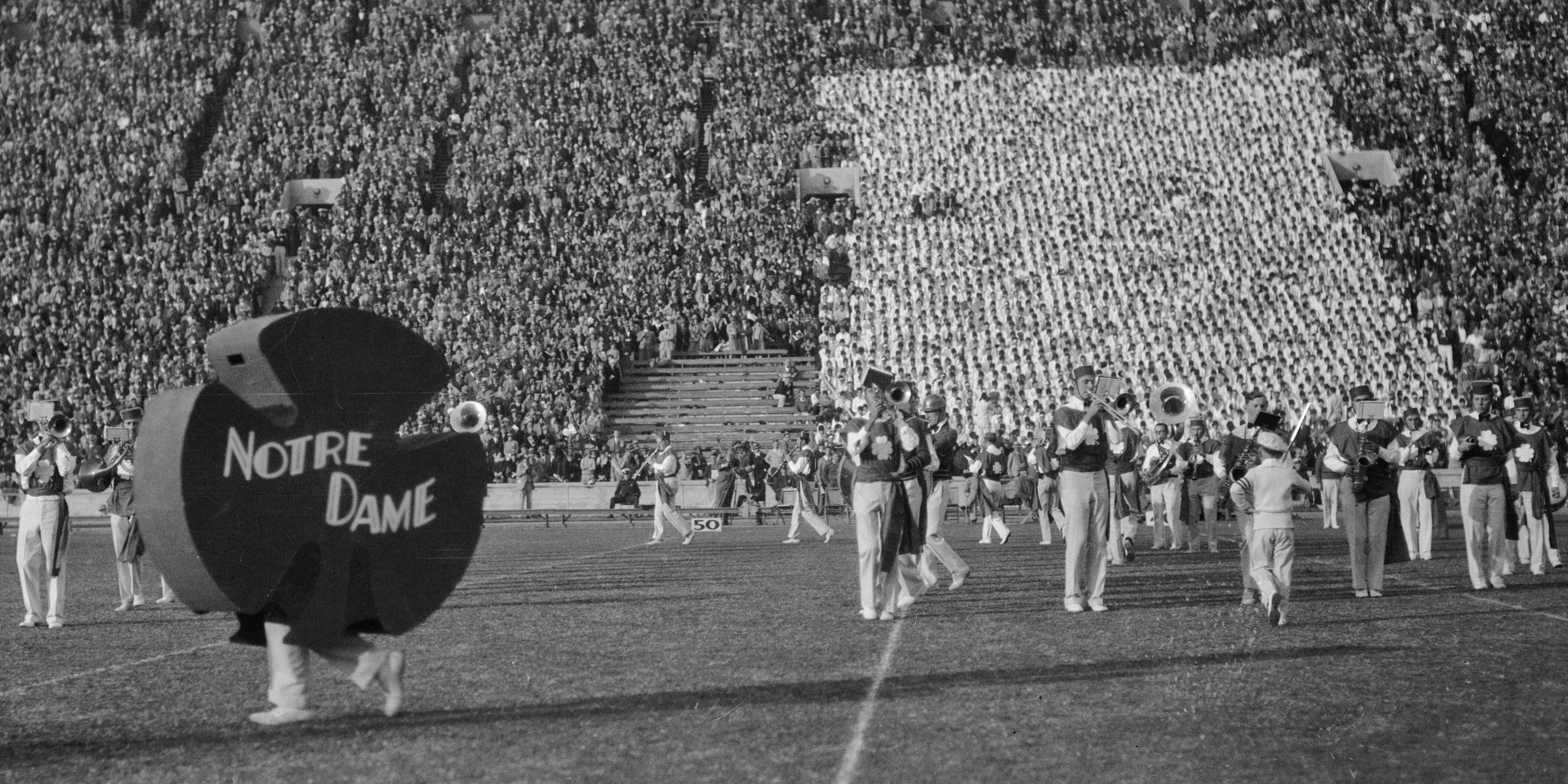
The band performing at the University of Southern California in December 1928

The University of Notre Dame Band is the oldest university band in continuous existence in the United States and was honored as such by being declared a "Landmark of American Music" by the National Music Council, the Indiana Music Educators Association and Exxon Corporation during the 1976 U.S. Bicentennial. The Band of the Fighting Irish has a long tradition of providing music and pageantry for the Notre Dame football games. It was on hand for the first game against the University of Michigan in 1887 and has not missed a single home game since. The Notre Dame Band was celebrating its forty-first anniversary when that historic first game was played.

The Band of the Fighting Irish began accepting students from Saint Mary's College in 1970, two years before the University of Notre Dame became coeducational.

=== Appearances ===
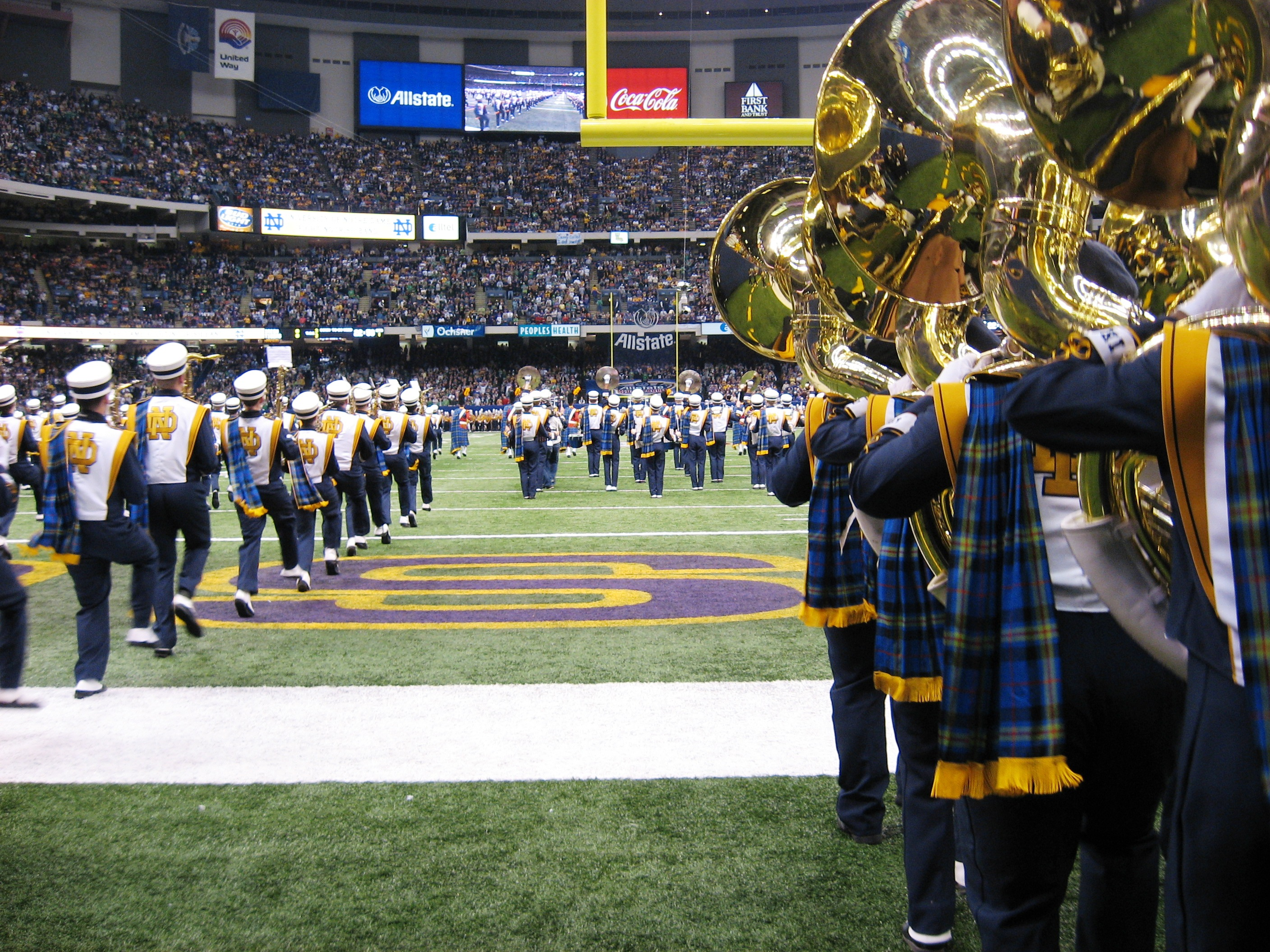
Closeup of the Notre Dame band as they take the field to perform the halftime show at the 73rd annual Sugar Bowl

The Notre Dame Band's early purpose was apparently to lift the spirits of students and provide entertainment on special occasions. The Band has also been on hand to witness many highs and lows in American history. It played at the university's "Main Circle" as students left to join the armies both North and South during the American Civil War. The Band played at the circle whenever students left to fight in World War I, World War II, Korea and Vietnam, and played a benefit concert for the victims of the Great Chicago Fire in 1871. The band has played around the country and around the world for countless concerts, masses, graduations, civic functions, bowl games, parades, athletic contests and many, many national championships. In recent years the Band has traveled to Michigan, Michigan State, Pittsburgh, Penn State, West Virginia, Missouri, Nebraska, Tennessee, Oklahoma, Southern California and Florida State. Bowl appearances have included the Fiesta Bowl, Gator Bowl, Cotton Bowl, Orange Bowl, the Sugar Bowl, the Sun Bowl, and the BCS National Championship Game.

The Band of the Fighting Irish has also partnered with OK Go in the making of the composition and music video for "This Too Shall Pass", appearing throughout the majority of the video in ghillie suits.

In May 2010, the Notre Dame Concert Band performed in Carnegie Hall in New York City; Regis Philbin conducted the Victory March.

Every year, part of the band goes on an international tour to a different part the world. Past sites have included New Zealand, Australia, Spain, Portugal, Croatia, and most recently South Africa in 2018.

=== Music ===
The Band of the Fighting Irish plays several songs unique to their program. Most notable among them is the Notre Dame Victory March, which was written by brothers Michael and John Shea in 1908. The Notre Dame Victory March was first played on campus in the rotunda of the Administration Building during the 1909 Easter celebration concert. The Band of the Fighting Irish began playing the song at athletic events ten years later.

Joseph Casasanta, who was the director from 1923 to 1942, composed several "football songs" for the Notre Dame Band, including "Hike, Notre Dame," "When the Irish Backs Go Marching By," and "Down the Line." Many years later, these songs remain in the Band of the Fighting Irish's repertoire and are often played at football games.

Robert F. Obrien, director from 1952 to 1986, introduced "Damhsa Bua" to the Notre Dame Band's repertoire. "Damhsa Bua" is a victory clog and is played after every victory and after every Notre Dame touchdown.

Kenneth Dye, the current Director of Bands for the University of Notre Dame, composed and added "Celtic Chant" to the Notre Dame Band's repertoire. "Celtic Chant" has since become a popular feature of the pre-game routine played at football games.

=== Notre Dame Band Alumni ===
The Notre Dame Band maintains close ties with all of the Notre Dame Band Alumni through a variety of communications including frequent newsletters. The Notre Dame Band Alumni are invited back to Notre Dame to perform with the student Notre Dame Band during a Notre Dame home football game approximately once every 4 years since 1985. On Saturday, October 13, 2018, almost 400 Notre Dame Band Alumni returned to practice, march, and perform with the student Notre Dame Band during the halftime show at the Notre Dame vs Pittsburgh football game for a sold-out crowd. The Notre Dame Band Alumni participant graduation years ranged from 1952 to 2017, and included 8 drum majors, 70 percussion, 200 woodwinds, and 190 brass. The 2018 Notre Dame Alumni Band played the Hike, Notre Dame, Down the Line, 1812 Overture, and the Notre Dame Victory March. arrangements. Past Notre Dame Band reunions included the 2006, 2010, 2014 Notre Dame vs. Stanford football Games.
