= Patrick Dillon =

Catholic priest, second President of Notre Dame (1832–1868)

The Reverend Patrick Dillon C.S.C.
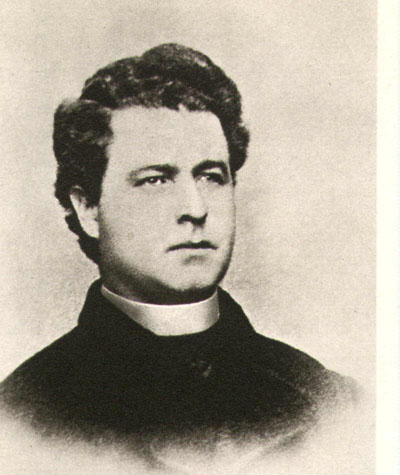

2nd President of the University of Notre Dame
- In office 1865–1866
- Preceded by: Edward Sorin
- Succeeded by: William Corby

Personal details
- Born: January 1, 1832 County Galway, Ireland
- Died: November 15, 1868 (aged 36) Notre Dame, Indiana, U.S.
- Resting place: Holy Cross Cemetery, Notre Dame, Indiana
- Education: St. Mary's College, Chicago

Patrick Dillon, C.S.C. (January 1, 1832 – November 15, 1868) was an Irish-American Catholic priest who served as president of the University of Notre Dame from 1865 to 1866. He was the first Irish priest at the university.

== President of the University of Notre Dame ==
The Rev. Patrick Dillon served as the second president of the University of Notre Dame from 1865 to 1866. He succeeded Fr. Edward Sorin when Sorin decided to focus on his job as Provincial of the Congregation. His brief tenure featured the construction of the second main building. Dillon instituted the Commercial Course, which offered students the opportunity to study bookkeeping and commercial law. He also laid the foundations for the development of a course in the sciences. He was popular with students because of his disciplinary leniency.

He died of illness a few years later in 1868.

== Legacy ==
Dillon Hall at the University of Notre Dame was dedicated in 1931 in his honor.
