= Alumni Hall (University of Notre Dame) =

Historic dormitory building in Indiana, U.S.

- Residence Hall
- University of Notre Dame
- Arms: Vert two chevronels argent between three dog or
- Campus quad: South
- Established: 1931
- Named for: Notre Dame Alumni
- Architect: Maginnis & Walsh
- Architectural style: Collegiate Gothic
- Colors: Green and white
- Gender: Male
- Rector: Br. Dennis Gunn, CFC
- Undergraduates: 234
- Postgraduates: 2 (serving as Assistant Rectors)
- Chapel: St. Charles Borromeo
- Mascot: Dawgs
- Sports: Baseball, basketball, football, hockey, soccer, lacrosse, bowling, volleyball
- Charities: Martin Hall - Notre Dame College in Bangladesh
- Major events: Wake Week, Alumni/Dillon Rivalry Week, Dawgtoberfest, Rally in the Alley, Catalino Wine Mixer, Challoween, Matt Brach Bash, 1SA Locker Box, Quad Dancing (Quancing)
- Website: alumnihall.nd.edu
- Alumni Hall
- U.S. Historic district – Contributing property
- Location within Indiana
- Location: Notre Dame, Indiana
- Coordinates: 41°41′58″N 86°14′21″W
- Built: 1931
- Architects: Maginnis and Walsh
- Architectural style: Collegiate Gothic
- Part of: University of Notre Dame: Main and South Quadrangles (ID78000053)
- Added to NRHP: May 23, 1978

Alumni Hall is one of the 33 Residence Halls on the campus of the University of Notre Dame and one of the 17 male dorms. It is located on South Quad adjacent to "Main Circle", across from the law school building, and it hosts 234 undergraduates.

It was built in 1931 by the architectural firm Maginnis & Walsh in collegiate gothic style, and it is one of the oldest and largest of residences halls at the university. During World War II, it hosted officers for the V-12 Navy College Training Program. Alumni residents are known for their strong rivalry with Dillon Hall and for their many traditions, including the Alumni Hall Wake. Together with other historic structures of the university, it is on the National Register of Historic Places.

== History ==
Alumni and Dillon Hall were built as part of an extensive building program that started in the mid 20s and aimed at improving educational and living facilities, and increasing supply of on-campus residential facilities. Early attempts at securing funds for Alumni Hall had been unsuccessful. The two dorms were expected to cost $850,000 and add host 500 students to reduce the housing shortage and increase on-campus students to 2,600. Ground was broken on March 2, 1931, and construction was contracted to Sollitt and Sons. Funds were collected through the Alumni Association and a $250,000 gift from the General Education Board. An additional $52,000 came from the 1925 Rose Bowl. Construction of Alumni Hall was part of a four building construction program for the southern edge of campus which cost more than $1,600,000 and also included Dillon, Cushing, and Hurley.

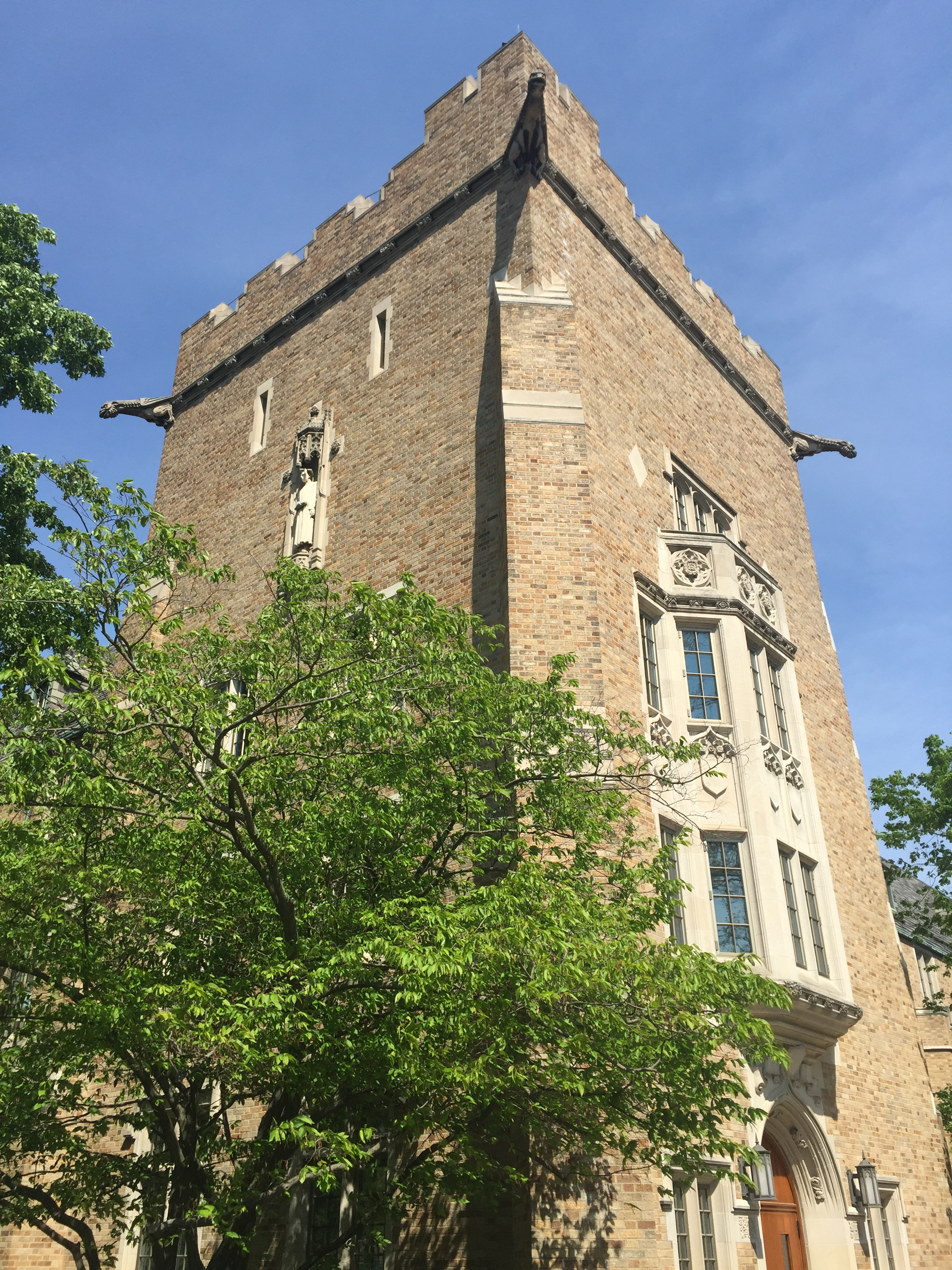
The Alumni Hall tower, built in collegiate gothic style by Maginnis & Walsh, and ornate with the statue of "Joe College" and gargoyles modeled on those of Notre-Dame de Paris

Both halls were designed in 1931 by architects Charles Donagh Maginnis and Timothy Walsh in Collegiate Gothic style. The Maginnis & Walsh was known at the time for its innovative and refined gothic design of churches and campuses in Boston, and was behind the campus architecture of Boston College and the Basilica of the National Shrine of the Immaculate Conception. The architectural style of both Dillon and Alumni was in line with the previous gothic building on campus by Kervick and Fagan such as Morrissey, with local yellow brick with limestone trimmings, adorned with stone carvings on the facade and the interiors.

Built at a total cost of $375,000, Alumni Hall had 169 single rooms and 20 doubles, in addition to those of the rector and the prefects and was at the time one of the most imposing residence halls on campus. The ground was broken on May 31, 1931, and were open by the fall of 1931. Alumni, whose construction engaged more than 250 workers of the Ralph Sollitt and Sons and was rushed to competition before the fall semester, occupied the former spot of parking lots and was built in light face brick with limestone trimmings. One of the goals of the constructions of Alumni was to host alumni reunions.

The first rector was Rev. Raymond Clancy, C.S.C. When the halls opened in late October 1931 and two hundred juniors (who had resided off campus for the beginning of the academic year) moved in, Alumni featured some of the latest technologies of the time, such as electric elevators, extension phones, buzzers, and slots for used razors. At the time of dedication, it was among the most modern dormitories in the Midwest. Since previous newest residential development of Howard Hall, Morrissey Hall, and Lyons Hall (built in 1924–1927) had previously been known as "Gold Coast" because of their refined architecture, Alumni and Dillon quickly were dubbed "Platinum Coast" both because they had improved amenities but also because of the grayer color of the architecture and decoration.

The hall was so named in honor of the university's alumni. Initially, a funding drive for a new hall was initiated by the Alumni Association in 1915 for the construction of a hall to be names 'Old Students' Hall' and serve as residence hall and to host alumni returning to campus. This fund was instead first invested in Liberty Bonds in 1917, and then again loaned to the university for other projects. When the project was revived in 1920, issues with the building field prevented construction. Again, in 1922 funds were collected but instead of initiating construction, the Alumni Associated gave more than $60,000 to the university to complete the fund to secure funds from the General Education Board. To honor this continued support of the Alumni Association, the university decided to name the hall 'Alumni Hall' in 1931. The name was chosen as a better sounding version of 'Old Students' Hall'. Additionally, given the shortage of student housing on-campus, the plan to have rooms dedicating to returning alumni was scrapped. The Coat of Arms features two white chevronels on a green field, the colors of the hall, and three dogs, the mascot of the hall. At the beginning, it hosted juniors. In 1932, during its second year of existence, it won the interhall football championship.

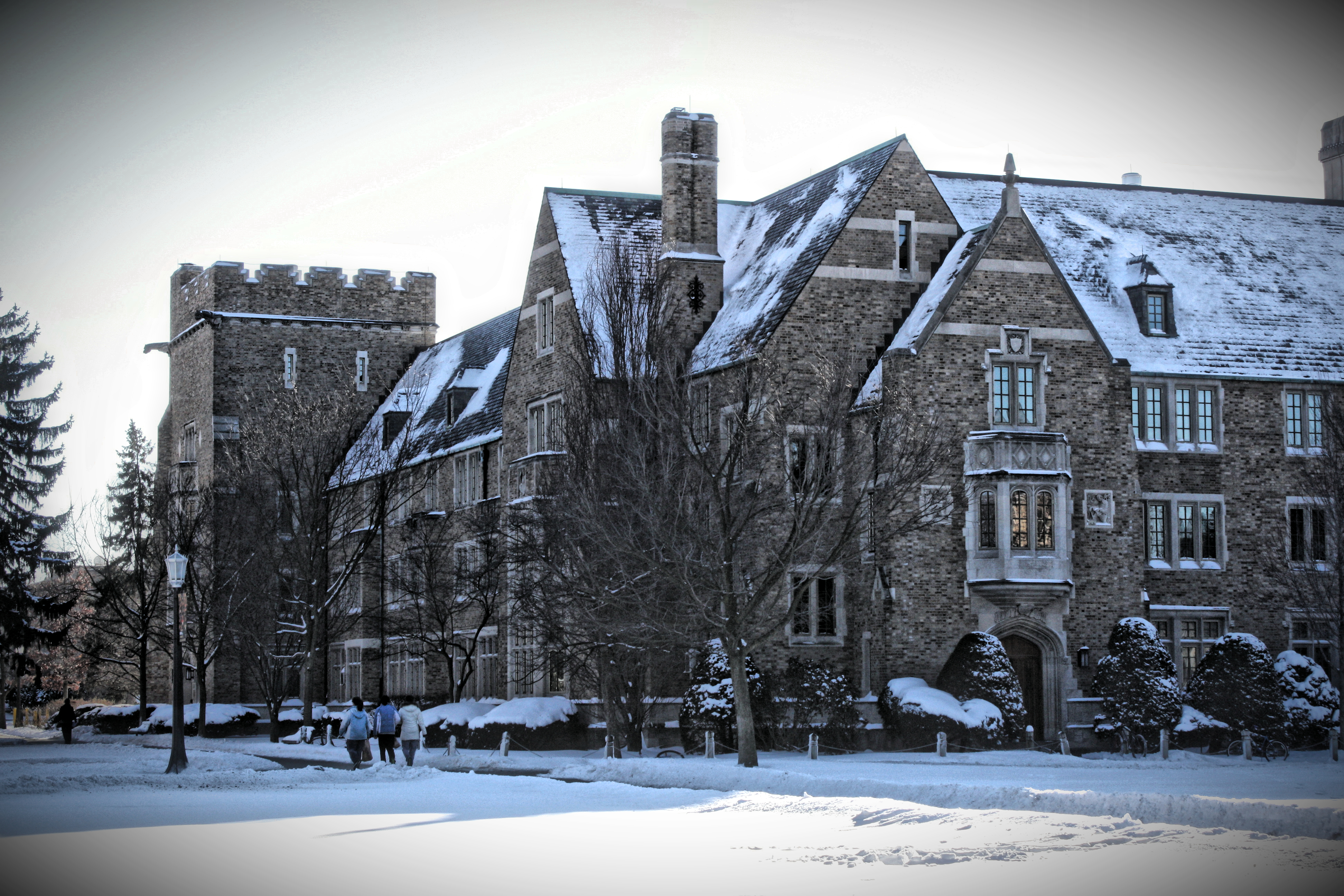
Alumni Hall in the winter

During World War II, Dillon and Alumni hosted officers for the V-12 Navy College Training Program. When Navy trainees took over the residence starting in the summer of 1943, Alumni's residents squeezed in with one another, turning all singles into doubles. The space was so cramped that Dave Condon '49, later a sportswriter for the Chicago Tribune, wrote in Scholastic that "when someone entered by the front door, it necessitated someone else leaving by the rear egress." Alumni Hall reverted to civilian student use in early 1945. Rev. Charles Carey, CSC, was named rector of Alumni in 1949.

In 1965, together with Farley and Dillon, it was the first dorm to try the "stay-hall" system, in which residents could stay all four years in the same hall rather than being divided by class as they were up until the 1960s.

Rev. George Rozum, CSC served as rector of Alumni Hall from 1978 to 2019, becoming the longest serving rector in the history of the university. A native of Mitchell, South Dakota, before being Alumni rector, Rozum served as chaplain at the Texas School for the Deaf and obtained a National Certificate for Teaching the Deaf from the University of Texas at Austin. He earned master's degrees in theology from Holy Cross College of Washington, DC and bachelor in philosophy and masters in accountancy from Notre Dame.

In 2015, Philip Faccenda endowed the rectorship of the hall, and established the Philip J. and Kathryn K. Faccenda Family Rectorship at Alumni Hall.

As part of the university's program of residential hall renovation, Alumni was renovated during the 2022–2023 academic year, and its residents were temporarily housed in Zahm Hall, known as "Alumni Community in Zahm Hall".

== Description ==
The building was built in neo-gothic style and designed by Maginnis and Walsh and was built in light face brick with limestone trimmings. The exterior features carvings of saints and athletes. The hall's unique architecture includes gargoyles up top and stone carvings of everything from Madonna and Child (north side chapel entrance), saints (Sts. Thomas Aquinas and Bonaventure in the courtyard, work by John J Bednar), an Irish Terrier (Clashmore Mike, one of the original mascots of the football team), to Knute Rockne (east side). The relief of Knute Rockne shows him kneeling in football togs while watching the football team drill. Other minor reliefs depict a student with an hourglass (a memento to procrastinating students), a relief of a student writing and another reading flanking the main door, and a sundial indicating post meridiem time (twin one on Dillon Hall indicated ante meridiem time instead). On the south side of the building, facing South Bend, is a statue by Hungarian artist Eugene Kormendi of a college graduate known as The Graduate or Joe College who is looking towards leaving college for the real world. The gargoyles adorning the tower were modeled after those of Notre-Dame de Paris.

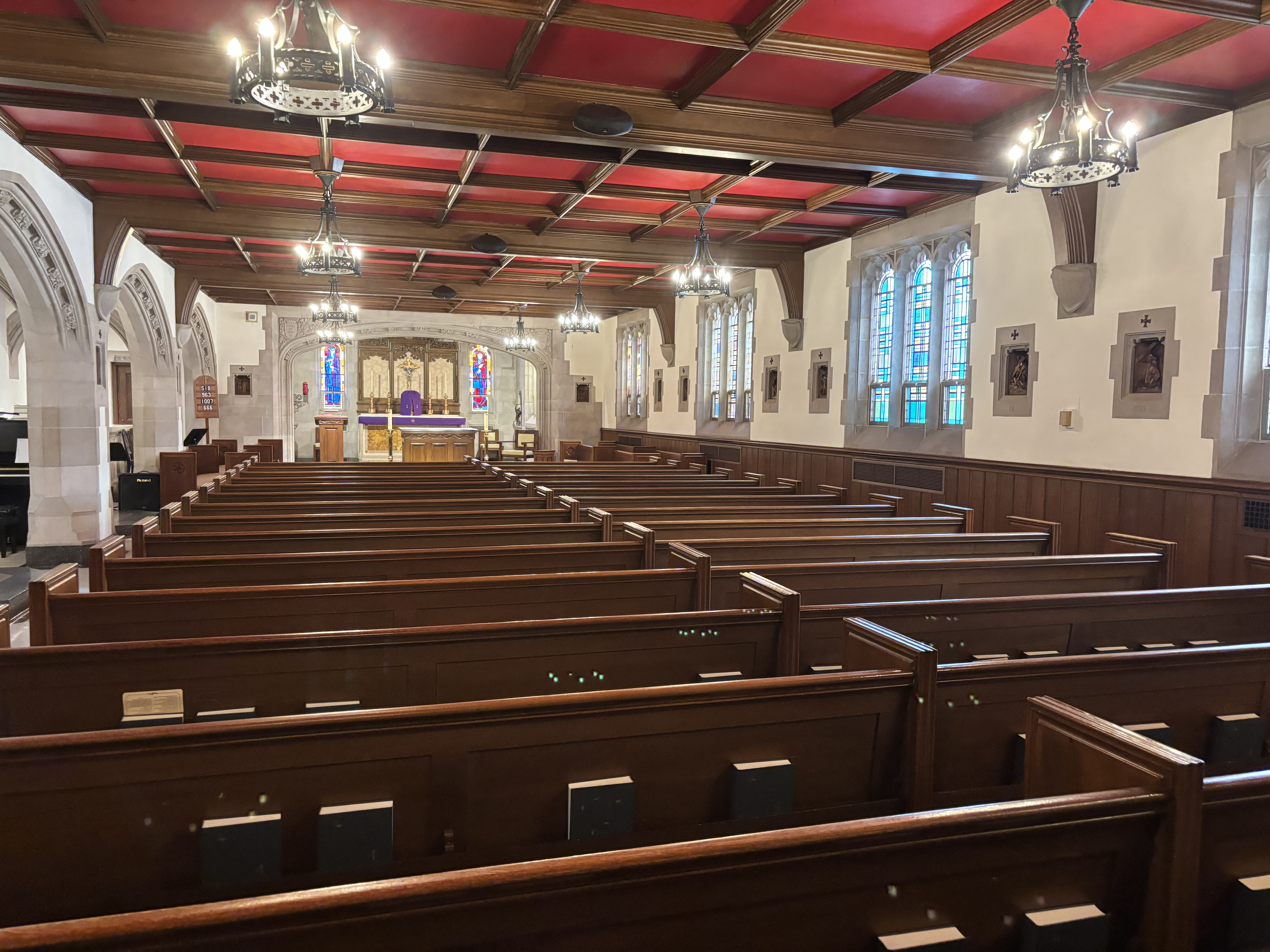
Chapel of St. Charles Borromeo in Alumni Hall

The hall's chapel is dedicated to St. Charles Borromeo, the patron saint of then-president Fr. Charles L. O'Donnell, CSC, and it features statues richly decorated neo-gothic interior with side altars with statues of Mary and St. Thomas Aquinas. The altars were installed in March 1932, and were made in and imported from Italy through the work of John F. O'Hara, then prefect of religion. The altars are made of Carrara marble and designed in gothic style of the rest of the building. It is the site of numerous religious events, including Latin Mass and a commemoration of the Armenian Genocide.

The ornate halls made up then the southern edge and entrance of campus. The neo-gothic architecture made Dillon and Alumni the most ornate, prestigious, and pretentious of the residence halls on campus at the time. Alumni Hall is shaped like a U, with the two arms facing Dillon Hall and creating a cloister-like courtyard. Originally, an arch was to connect the dorms, put the plan was scrapped.

== Traditions ==
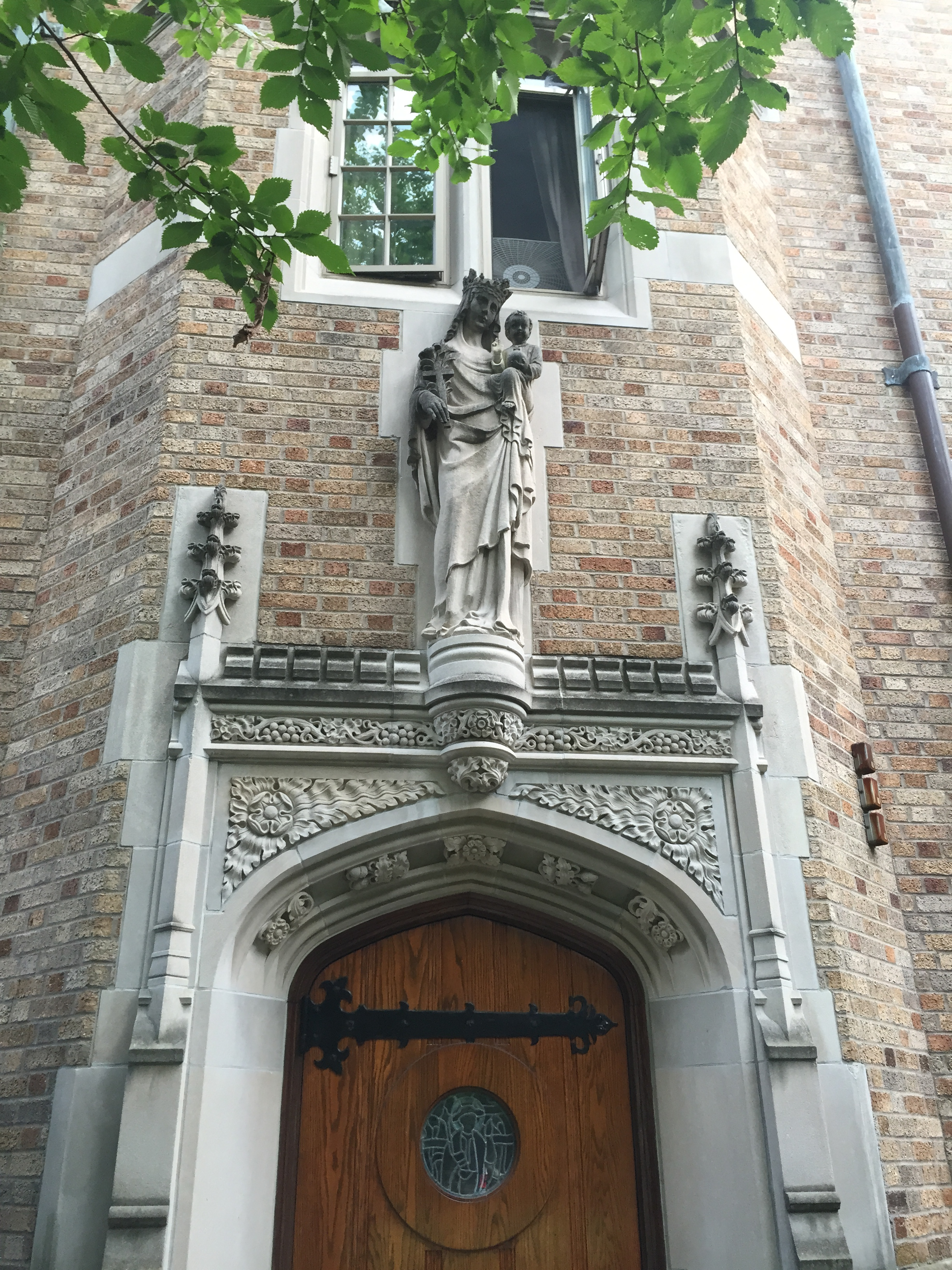
Entrance to the Chapel of St Charles Borromeo

The mascot of alumni hall is the Dawg, in honor of Clashmore Mike, the original Notre Dame mascot donated by Knute Rockne that was subsequently replaced by the Leprechaun. Alumni's close-knit community and tradition for rambunctious behavior likens them to a traditional fraternity; so much so that the dorm is represented by and displays Greek letters. These letters are Delta-Omega-Gamma, which spells out the name of the alumni mascot, a dog (the only time it is not spelled out as "Dawg"). They display their letters three times a year: during Freshman Orientation (Frosh-O), during Alumni-Dillon Rivalry Week, and during Alumni's secretive Wake Week (shrouded in mystery) in the spring.

The Alumni Wake, started in 1983, was inspired by traditional Irish wakes with late night partying. The first Wake involved a handmade wooden coffin, flowers raided from a cemetery trash heap, and a procession. It was intended to be a fancy event, with decorations that turned sections of the dorm into Dublin streets. In subsequent years the Wake became a rowdy and alcohol-infused celebration surrounded by bizarre traditions, one of which involved Rector George Rozum, CSC, ‘61, ’80MSA, being carried into the hall's dance inside a coffin. The Wake was traditionally held in the basement of Alumni Hall, but with stricter rules from the administration the Wake was moved to other locations around campus. From the original Irish Wake sprang the Wake Week of today, a week shrouded in celebration and mystery. Though the administration has cracked down on the celebration, the Wake retains much of its original spirit and mystery.

Alumni Hall has a long-lasting rivalry with Dillon Hall, with which it shares a courtyard. Though Dillon contains a larger number of inhabitants, Alumni residents refer to Dillon as the "little brother". In the 1970s and ‘80s, residents were engaged in the "Window Wars" by throwing and hitting golf balls from the courtyard at Dillon's windows at 3 in the morning after Dillon initiated the conflict.

== Notable residents ==
- Johnny Lattner '54 - Heisman trophy winner
- Richard Edmund Lyng '40 – former Secretary of Agriculture under President Ronald Reagan
- James Creagan '62 – President of John Cabot University
- Rev. William Beauchamp, CSC '75 – Former President of the University of Portland
- Jerome Bettis – former professional football player, Pittsburgh Steelers, current sports commentator, Pro Football Hall of Fame inductee
- Brian Casey '85 – 17th President, Colgate University
- Thom Browne '88 – fashion designer, founder and head designer, Thom Browne
- Rick Mirer '93 – former professional football player in the National Football League
- Ronald Talley – professional football player, Arizona Cardinals
- Dave Finocchio ‘05 – founder and CEO of Bleacher Report
- Jeff Samardzija '07 – professional baseball player, San Francisco Giants
- Tom Zbikowski '08 – professional football player, Indianapolis Colts
- Tim Abromaitis '11 – University of Notre Dame men's basketball player
- Harrison Smith '11 – professional football player, Minnesota Vikings
- Louis Nix – "Irish Chocolate," professional football player, Jacksonville Jaguars
- Chris Watt '14 – professional football player
- Yared Nuguse '21 – 2019 NCAA Division I Champion and record holder for the fastest recorded American mile
- Phil Donahue - TV personality
- John Burgee - Architect
- Barry Voight - Geologist and volcanologist

== Gallery ==
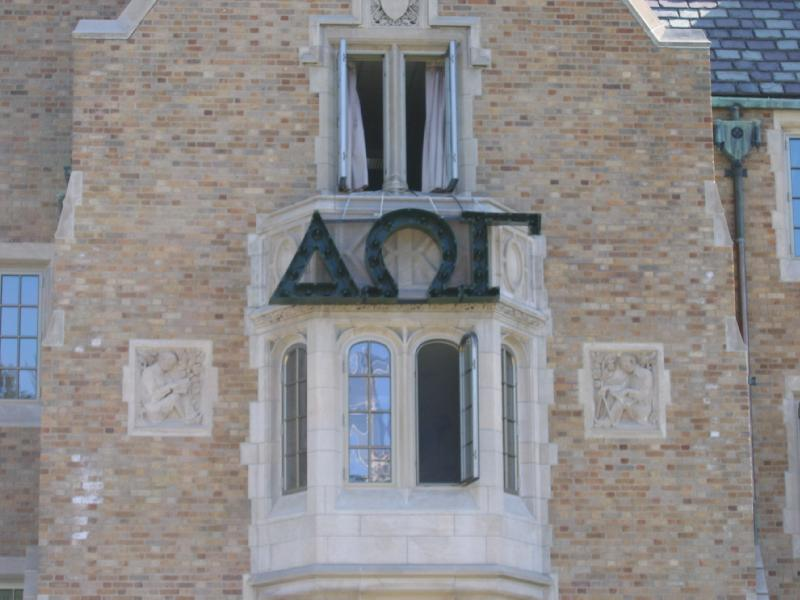
The Greek letters spelling "DOG", the symbol of the Hall

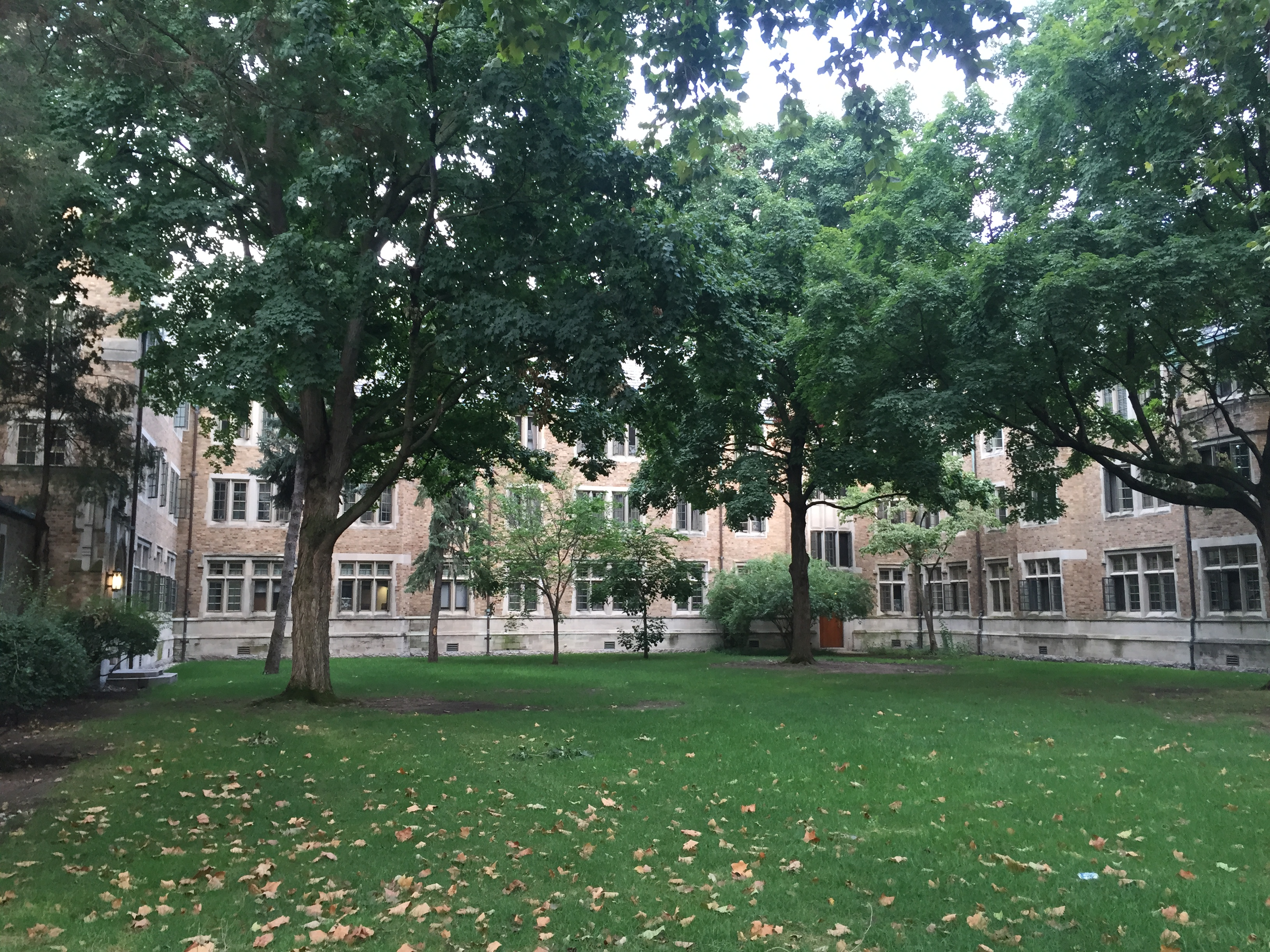
The Dillon-Alumni courtyard
