= Irish Guard (Notre Dame) =

Notre Dame colorguard

The Irish Guard
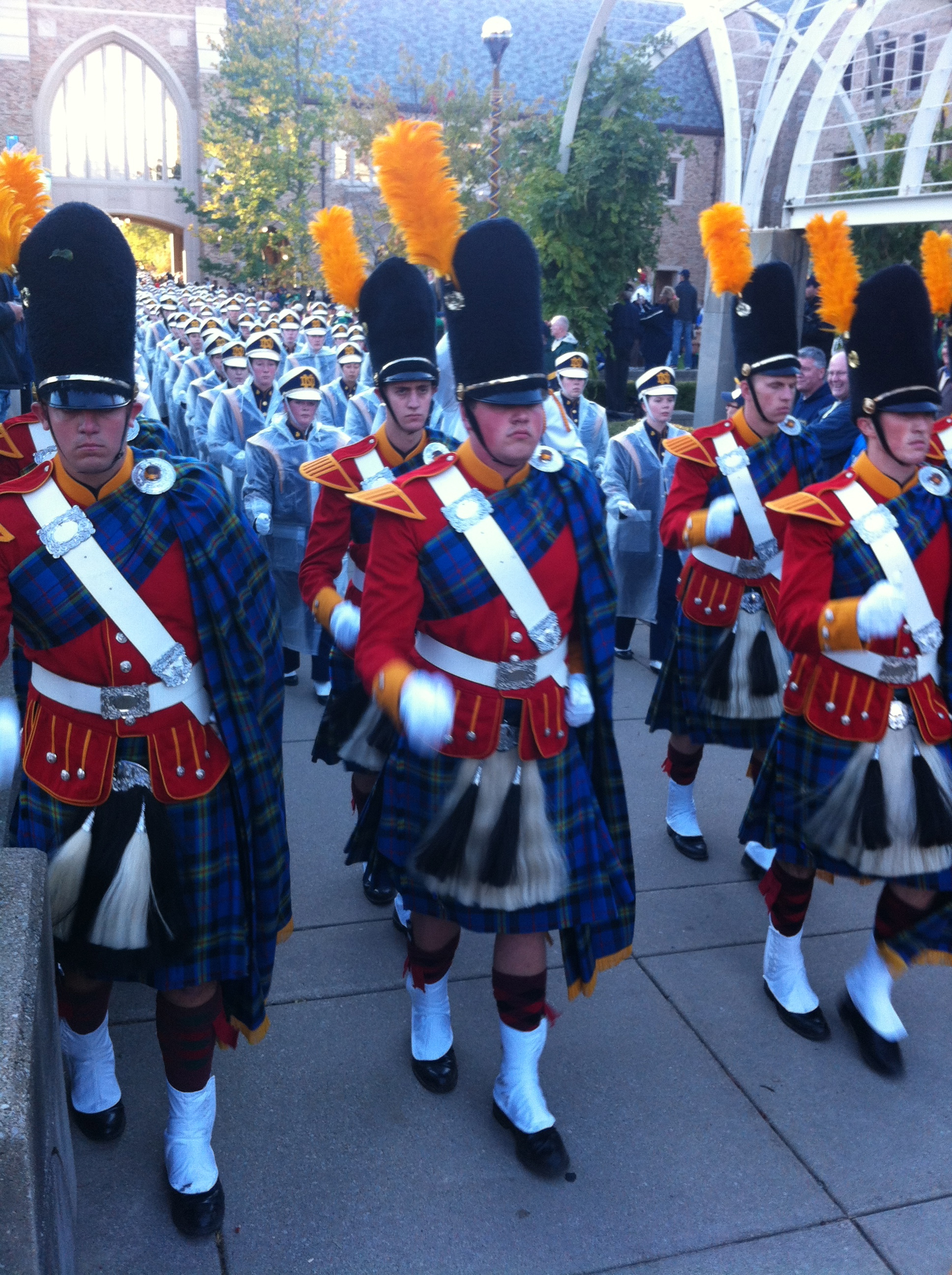
- The Irish Guard as it marches into Notre Dame Stadium
- Active: 1951-Present
- Country: United States of America
- Type: Unit of authority
- Role: Escorting the Band of the Fighting Irish
- Size: 8 Guards
- March: Hike Step: "Hike, Notre Dame"

Insignia
- Tartan: Notre Dame Marching Guard
- Plume: Yellow; Right side of Bearskin Shako

The Irish Guard is a group of uniformed students that leads the University of Notre Dame's Band of the Fighting Irish onto the field at home games. They are considered by some to be one of the integral parts in the pageantry, lore, and legend of Notre Dame football.

== History ==
The Irish Guard was formed in 1951 as a part of the University of Notre Dame Marching Band. The unit was originally known as the Irish Piper Unit—the members played bagpipes—and debuted at the Notre Dame-Purdue football game on Oct. 27, 1951.

Under the direction of Louis Snedden of South Bend, the pipers had been practicing since the previous spring. Snedden was a piper aboard British ships, and trained a Reserve Pipe Band in England before immigrating to the U.S.

By 1953, the unit was known as the Irish Guard and the members no longer played instruments.

The uniform of the guard is based on the pattern of the traditional Scottish kilt and incorporated the unique Notre Dame tartan. Starting in the late 1950s, John Fyfe, a native of Glasgow, Scotland and an employee of the LOBUND Laboratory Notre Dame, provided members with training on the proper way to dress, march and comport themselves in public.

They accompany the Notre Dame Marching Band at away games throughout the season, and at all home games at Notre Dame Stadium. The Irish Guard travels with the band to away games and marches with the band on campus. These traditions include the Victory Clog to the tune "Damhsa Bua" performed after every Irish football win..

In 2002, the Irish Guard was banned from the Notre Dame-Pittsburgh game after some of the members were caught on TV sleeping on the sidelines at the Stanford game on October 5.

== Requirements ==
Members of the Irish Guard must demonstrate a refined marching technique, a dedication to university ideals, as well as stature and poise.

For decades, the Irish Guard was an all-male unit. In 2000, student Molly Kinder tried out and became the first female member of the unit. There have been several more female guardsmen in the years since.

In 2014, Notre Dame Band Director Kenneth Dye instituted a policy that limited Irish Guard membership to students who had previously served for at least one year in the marching band as an instrumentalist or manager. The requirement that guardsmen stand at least 6 feet 2 inches tall was eliminated. This policy change ended the decades-long tradition that allowed any Notre Dame student in good standing to tryout for the Irish Guard.
