= List of public art in St. Joseph County, Indiana =

This is a list of public art in St. Joseph County, Indiana.

This list applies only to works of public art accessible in an outdoor public space. For example, this does not include artwork visible inside a museum.

Most of the works mentioned are sculptures. When this is not the case (i.e. sound installation, for example) it is stated next to the title.

== Mishawaka ==
Title	Artist	Year	Location/GPS Coordinates	Material	Dimensions	Owner	Image
Christopher Columbus	David M. Layman	1992	City Hall 41°39′57″N 86°10′39″W	Bronze	Sculpture: approx. 5 x 9 x 5 ft.	City of Mishawaka	
The Immigrants	Kathryn Field	1993	Gateway Park	Painted steel	Sculpture: 2 parts: Immigrant family: approx. H. 25 ft.; Woman and girl: approx. H. 15 ft.	City of Mishawaka	
Our Lady of Lourdes Grotto	Unknown		Sisters of St. Francis of Perpetual Adoration Convent	Limestone, paint, ceramic coated metal	Virgin Mary: approx. 6 ft. x 23 in. x 30 in.; Bernadette: approx. 3 ft. x 15 in. x 20 in.; Grotto: approx. 65 x 20 x 15 ft.	Sisters of St. Francis of Perpetual Adoration	
Princess Mishawaka	Sufi Ahmad	1987	City Hall 41°39′37.7″N 86°10′22.98″W	Bronze	Sculpture: approx. 5 x 9 x 5 ft.	City of Mishawaka	
Stations of the Cross and Calvary Scene	Unknown	1944	Sisters of St. Francis of Perpetual Adoration Convent	Marble, paint, limestone, concrete	14 stations. Each sculpture: approx. 28 x 22 x 11 in.; Each base: approx. 6 1/2 ft. x 30 in. x 16 in.; Each foundation: approx. 3 in. x 4 ft. 6 in. x 4 ft. 6 in.; Crucifixion scene: approx. 16 x 16 x 9 ft.	Sisters of St. Francis of Perpetual Adoration	

== Notre Dame ==
Title	Artist	Year	Location/GPS Coordinates	Material	Dimensions	Owner	Image
Christ the Teacher	Monica Gabriel	1955	Saint Mary's College, Lake Marion	Indiana Limestone & Granite	Sculpture: approx. 5 ft. x 19 in. x 18 in.	Saint Mary's College	
Clarke Memorial Fountain	John Burgee, Philip Johnson (architects)	1983	University of Notre Dame	Indiana limestone & Granite	Sculpture: approx. 20 x 15 x 35 ft.	University of Notre Dame	
The Descent of the Holy Spirit	David Hayes	1961	Moreau Seminary	Bronze or copper, patina	12 pieces. Overall: approx. 7 1/2 ft. x 11 ft. x 7 in.	Congregation of Holy Cross	
Dillon Hall Figures	John Bednar	Early 1940s	Dillon Hall	Limestone	4 figures. Each figure approx. 5 1/2 x 1 1/2 x 1 ft.	University of Notre Dame	
Dr. Tom Dooley and Two Laotian Children	Rudolph Torrini	1985	University of Notre Dame, The Grotto	Bronze, concrete	Sculpture: approx. 4 ft. 3 in. x 2 ft. 2 in. x 1 ft. 6 in.; Base: approx. 4 ft. 6 in. x 5 ft. 1 in. x 4 ft. 6 in.	University of Notre Dame	
Statue of Edward Sorin	Ernesto Biondi	1906	University of Notre Dame, Main quadrangle	Bronze	Approx. 8 ft. x 2 ft. 6 in. x 2 ft. 6 in.	University of Notre Dame	
Immaculate Conception	Giovanni Meli	1880	University of Notre Dame, Administrative Building	Gilded cast-iron	Sculpture: approx. 16 x 7 x 3 ft.	University of Notre Dame	
Our Lady of the Immaculate Conception	Unknown	1904	Saint Mary's College, Holy Cross Hall	Marble	Approx. 8 ft. x 3 ft. 2 ft. 6 in.	Saint Mary's College	
Pieta	Waldemar Otto	1964	Moreau Seminary	Bronze	Approx. 54 x 61 x 20 in.	Congregation of Holy Cross	
Prayer	Anthony Joseph Lauck	1959	Moreau Seminary	Limestone	Approx. 36 x 16 x 14 1/2 in.	University of Notre Dame	
Relief Panels	Unknown		University of Notre Dame, Dining Hall	Limestone	4 relief panels. Indian: approx. 30 x 30 x 3 in.; Eagle: approx. 30 x 30 x 3 in.; Baseball Players: each approx. 6 x 6 x 1 in.	University of Notre Dame	
Chaplain Corby of Gettysburg	Samuel Murray	1911	University of Notre Dame, Corby Hall	Bronze	Figure: approx. 6 ft. 8 in. x 2 ft. 4 in. x 3 ft. 4 in.	University of Notre Dame	
Sacred Heart of Jesus statue	Robert Cassiani	1893	University of Notre Dame, Administration Building	Bronze	Figure: approx. 6 x 5 x 3 ft.	University of Notre Dame	
St. Bonaventure with Cardinal's Hat	John J. Bednar	c. early 1940s	University of Notre Dame, Alumni Hall	Limestone	Approx. 6 x 1 x 1 ft.	University of Notre Dame	
St. Edward the Confessor	Froc-Robert & Sons	1880	University of Notre Dame, St. Edward's Hall 41°42′11.5″N 86°14′17.01″W	Metal	Sculpture: approx. 7 ft. 3 in. x 2 ft. 7 in. x 2 ft. 3 in.	University of Notre Dame	
St. Joseph	N. Serf		University of Notre Dame	Metal	Sculpture: approx. 6 1/2 ft. x 28 in. x 17 in.	University of Notre Dame	
St. Thomas More and Christ the King	Conrad Schmitt Studios	1880	University of Notre Dame, Notre Dame Law School 41°41′55.27″N 86°14′16.45″W	Limestone	2 pieces. Each sculpture: approx. 5 x 2 x 1 ft.	University of Notre Dame	
St. Thomas Aquinas	John J. Bednar	Early 1940s	University of Notre Dame, Alumni Hall	Limestone	Approx. 6 x 1 x 1 ft.	University of Notre Dame	
St. Timothy	James Kress	c. 1946	University of Notre Dame, Howard Hall	Limestone	Approx. 6 x 2 1/2 x 2 ft.	University of Notre Dame	
Seated Scholars, Stylized Athletes	Unknown		University of Notre Dame, Dillon Hall	Limestone	Athletes: approx. 10 x 12 x 4 in.; Scholars: each approx. 3 1/2 ft. x 2 1/2 ft. x 6 in.	University of Notre Dame	

== Osceola ==
Title	Artist	Year	Location/GPS Coordinates	Material	Dimensions	Owner	Image
Four Apostles	Unknown	c. late 1960s	Chapel Hill Memory Gardens	Concrete, paint	Sculpture: approx. 87 x 44 x 44 in.; Each relief: approx. 70 x 28 x 6 in.	Memory Gardens Management Corporation	
Jesus and the Woman at the Well	Unknown	c. late 1960s	Chapel Hill Memory Gardens	Concrete, paint, stone	Sculpture: approx. 6 ft. 10 in. x 6 ft. x 42 in.; Base: approx. 100 x 138 x 40 in.	Memory Gardens Management Corporation	
The Last Supper	Tavarelli Marble Works	c. 1990	Chapel Hill Memory Gardens	Marble	Approx. 4 1/2 ft. x 9 ft. 3 in. x 4 in.	Memory Gardens Management Corporation	

== South Bend ==
Title	Artist	Year	Location/GPS Coordinates	Material	Dimensions	Owner	Image
Blessed Mother	Edwin Hanc Company		St. Adalbert's Roman Catholic Church	Carrara Marble	Sculpture: approx. 5 ft. x 1 ft. 11 in. x 18 in.	St. Adalbert Parish	
Christ the King	S.A. J.	1950	St. Stanislaus Roman Catholic Church 41°40′49.61″N 86°16′39.83″W	Metal & Glass	Sculpture: approx. 6 ft. 2 ft. x 1 ft. 6 in.	St. Stanislaus Roman Catholic Church	
Christus	Granite-Bronze Monument	c. 1985	Riverview Cemetery, Christus Garden	Carrara marble	Sculpture: approx. 6 ft. x 34 in. x 16 in.	Riverview Cemetery	
Grotto	Chester Jankowski	1962	St. Stanislaus Roman Catholic Church	Plastic, Concrete, & Fieldstone	Mary: approx. 5 ft. x 15 in. x 15 in.; St. Joseph: approx. 35 in. x 10 1/2 in. x 9 in.; Grotto: approx. 23 x 63 x 47 1/2 ft.	St. Casimir Parish, South Bend	
Grotto of Our Lady of Lourdes	Unknown	1954	St. Hedwig Roman Catholic Church	Marble, limestone	Figure of Mary: approx. 6 ft. x 18 in. x 13 in.; Grotto: approx. 12 1/2 ft. x 6 ft. 8 in. x 6 ft.	St. Casimir Parish, South Bend	
St. Joseph County Vietnam Veterans Memorial	Jed Eide	1989	Howard Park 41°40′28.71″N 86°14′35.74″W	Granite	Sculpture: approx. 11 ft. x 17 in. x 17 in.	City of South Bend	
St. Joseph the Worker	Theodore Golubic		St Joseph Catholic Church41°40′44.39″N 86°14′33.95″W	Limestone	Approx. 8 ft. x 2 1/2 ft. x 12 in.	St Joseph Catholic Church	
Soldiers and Sailors Monument	Rudolf Schwarz	1903	St. Joseph County Courthouse41°40′34.21″N 86°15′9.04″W	Bronze	Overall: approx. 65 x 20 x 20 ft.; Color Bearer: approx. 10 ft. 6 in. x 2 ft. x 5 ft.; Pedestal figures: approx. 8 x 2 x 8 ft.; Shaft: approx. H. 25 ft.; Pedestal: approx. 13 1/2 x 20 x 20 ft. (55,800 lbs.).	City of South Bend	
Statue of Liberty Replica	Frédéric Auguste Bartholdi	1951	St. Joseph County Courthouse41°40′32.89″N 86°15′7.95″W	Sheet copper, green patina	Sculpture: approx. 8 ft. x 22 1/2 in. x 22 1/2 in.	City of South Bend	
Three Tympana	Unknown	1926	St. Adalbert's Church (South Bend, Indiana)41°40′11.87″N 86°17′0.29″W	Limestone	Center tympanum: approx. 7 ft. x 7 ft. x 7 1/2 in.; Smaller tympana each: approx. 36 x 42 x 7 1/2 in.; Overall: approx. W. 16 ft.	Roman Catholic Diocese of Fort Wayne-South Bend	
