= Patrick Colovin =

Fifth president of the University of Notre Dame

The Reverend Patrick Colovin C.S.C.
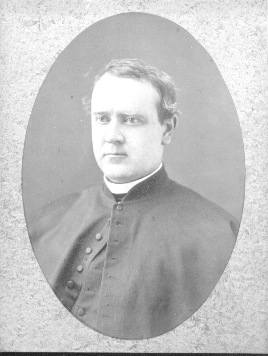

5th President of the University of Notre Dame
- In office 1874–1877
- Preceded by: Auguste Lemmonier
- Succeeded by: William Corby

Personal details
- Born: July 4, 1842 London, Ontario, Canada
- Died: August 20, 1887 (aged 45) Dayton, Green County, Wisconsin
- Resting place: Holy Cross Cemetery, Notre Dame, Indiana
- Education: College de Saint-Laurent

Ecclesiastical career
- Religion: Christianity
- Church: Roman Catholic Church
- Ordained: May 1867
- Congregations served: St. Bernard's Church, Watertown; Sacred Heart Parish, London; St. James Parish, Dayton

Patrick J. Colovin, C.S.C. (July 4, 1842 – August 22, 1887) was an Irish-Canadian Catholic priest who served as president of the University of Notre Dame from 1874 to 1877.

== Early life ==
Patrick J. Colovin was born in London, Ontario in 1842 to Irish immigrants Charles and Rose (O’Reilly) Colovin. He is the brother of Matthew F. Colovin (1840-1900), the first professor of law at the University of Notre Dame.

Patrick Colovin was educated in Montreal at the College de Saint-Laurent, where he was ordained in May 1867. Rev. Edward Sorin insisted that Colovin be appointed superior in Montreal shortly thereafter.

In 1871–72, Father Sorin assigned Colovin to the University of Notre Dame as professor of Christian Doctrine (Moral Philosophy) and French.

From 1872 to 1874 he served as associate pastor of St. Bernard's Parish (with Rev. William Corby, C.S.C) and as Director of Studies and Professor of Moral and Mental Philosophy and Classics at Our Lady of the Sacred Cross (later named Sacred Heart College) in Watertown, Wisconsin.

== President of the University of Notre Dame ==
Colovin was noticed while he was working at Sacred Heart College in Watertown with Rev. William Corby and was made vice-president at the request of Lemmonier. After the death of Rev. Auguste Lemmonier, Rev. Edward Sorin tapped him to be the new president. Colovin had an insubordinate temper and was often at odds with Fr. Sorin; he was popular among Irish students and his celebration of Saint Patrick's Day was disapproved by Sorin. His tenure saw economic difficulties due to the post-war period and lower student enrollment, and he was forced to resign in 1877.

== After Notre Dame ==
Following his tenure at Notre Dame he returned to Watertown as pastor of St. Bernard's, and remained there until April, 1880. He was next assigned to a parish in Lead in the Black Hills, South Dakota, where he served from 1880 - 81.

In 1882 Father Colovin returned to his native London, Ontario and, after a rocky relationship with Father Sorin, was released from the Congregation of Holy Cross. By 1883 Father Colovin was affiliated with Sacred Heart Parish in London, Ontario.

He relocated to Dayton, Green County, Wisconsin in 1886 as pastor of St. James Parish and remained there until his death in August 1887.
