= St. Joseph County Courthouse =

St. Joseph County Courthouse may refer to:

- Second St. Joseph County Courthouse, South Bend, Indiana
- Third St. Joseph County Courthouse, South Bend, Indiana
- St. Joseph County Courthouse (Michigan), Centreville, Michigan
