= Statue of Thomas Anthony Dooley III =

Statue in Notre Dame, Indiana, U.S.

- The statue in 2023
- Artist: Rudolph Torrini
- Subject: Thomas Anthony Dooley III
- Location: Notre Dame, Indiana, U.S.; 41°42′10.7″N 86°14′26.3″W

A statue of Thomas Anthony Dooley III by Rudolph Torrini, sometimes called Dr. Tom Dooley and Two Laotian Children, is installed on the University of Notre Dame campus, in the U.S. state of Indiana.

== Description ==
The statue of Thomas Anthony Dooley III with Lao children is installed near the Grotto of Our Lady of Lourdes, Notre Dame. The bronze sculpture measures approximately 4 ft. 3 in. x 2 ft. 2 in. x 1 ft. 6 in., and rests on a concrete base that measures approximately 4 ft. 6 in. x 5 ft. 1 in. x 4 ft. 6 in. A plaque reads: "THOMAS A. DOOLEY, M.D. '48 / 1927-1961 / Who as a pre-medical student / cherished Our Lady's Grotto / and who as a physician served the afflicted people of Southeast Asia / with uncommon devotion and dedication / Gift of the / Notre Dame Club of St. Louis / and the sculptor / Rudolph E. Torrini '59 / Dedicated February 1, 1986".

== History ==
The work was created in 1985 and dedicated on February 1, 1986. It was surveyed by the Smithsonian Institution's "Save Outdoor Sculpture!" program in 1993.

== See also ==
- 1985 in art
- List of public art in St. Joseph County, Indiana
