= Clarke Memorial Fountain =

Fountain in Notre Dame, Indiana, U.S.

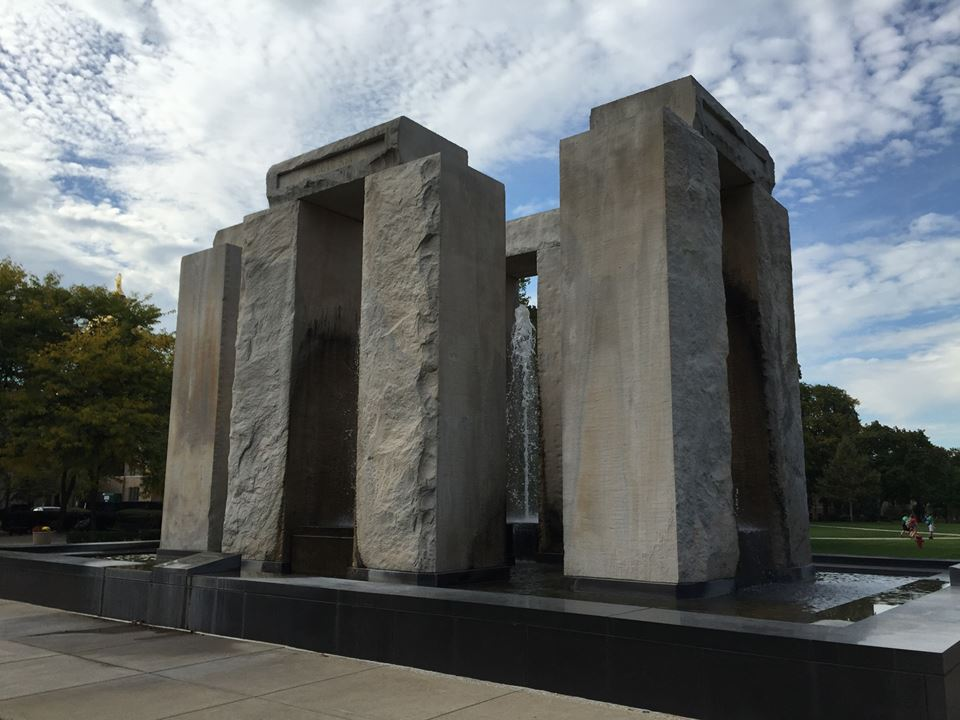
- Clarke Memorial Fountain in 2015
- Location: University of Notre Dame, Notre Dame, Indiana, United States
- Coordinates: 41.702288°N 86.236627°W
- Designer: John Burgee; Philip Johnson
- Type: Fountain
- Material: Granite; Limestone
- Height: 20 feet (6.1 m)
- Dedicated date: 1986
- Dedicated to: Notre Dame alumni who died in World War II, the Korean War, and the Vietnam War

The Clarke Memorial Fountain is a large public fountain on the campus of the University of Notre Dame in Notre Dame, Indiana, United States.

The fountain, originally known as the War Memorial, was dedicated in 1986. Designed by University of Notre Dame alumnus John Burgee and Philip Johnson, the fountain was intended as a memorial to the approximately 500 Notre Dame alumni who died in World War II, the Korean War, and the Vietnam War. The memorial's dedication led to some protests by anti-war student activists, and today it is officially known as the Clarke Memorial Fountain, named after alumnus and benefactor Maude Clarke. Clarke, along with John Schuff, had dedicated the fountain in honor of Clarke's husband John, an officer in the United States Army.

== Design ==
The monument consists of four limestone arches rising from a shallow granite pool. The arches consist of two columns weighing 40,000 pounds (18,000 kg) each capped at the top by another block of limestone. Each arch features a lit fountain, while a granite sphere in the middle of the pool has another fountain. The limestone structures stand 20 feet (6.1 m) tall. Three of the columns are inscribed with the names of the wars they commemorate ("World War II", "Korea", and "Vietnam"), while an inscription on the fourth arch reads "Pro Patria et Pace", which is Latin for "For Country and Peace". A plaque near the fourth arch contains words spoken by Theodore Hesburgh, President of the University of Notre Dame, at the memorial's dedication, reading:

About 500 Notre Dame Alumni gave their lives for their country and for Peace in World War II, Korea and Vietnam. In memorializing them, we join our prayers to their supreme sacrifice as we inscribe this column: Pro Patria et Pace, For Country and Peace. This is our Prayer, that all living Notre Dame Men and Women dedicate themselves to the service of their Country and World Peace.

Due to the design of the memorial, it is often referred to as "Stonehenge". The monument is located at Fieldhouse Mall (the former site of the Notre Dame Fieldhouse), west of the Hesburgh Library.

== Traditions ==
Since September 11, 2001, there has been a tradition with the Reserve Officers' Training Corps at Notre Dame where a 24-hour vigil is held under the fountain every Veterans Day. Another tradition among students is to celebrate Notre Dame Fighting Irish football wins by splashing and celebrating in the fountain.

On November 15, 2015, during the 2015–2016 University of Missouri protests, an event was held at the fountain as a show of solidarity with the protestors there, with many of the attendees wearing all-black.

== See also ==
- 1986 in art
- List of public art in St. Joseph County, Indiana
