= Saint Bernard's Church Complex =

Historic church in Wisconsin, United States

- U.S. National Register of Historic Places
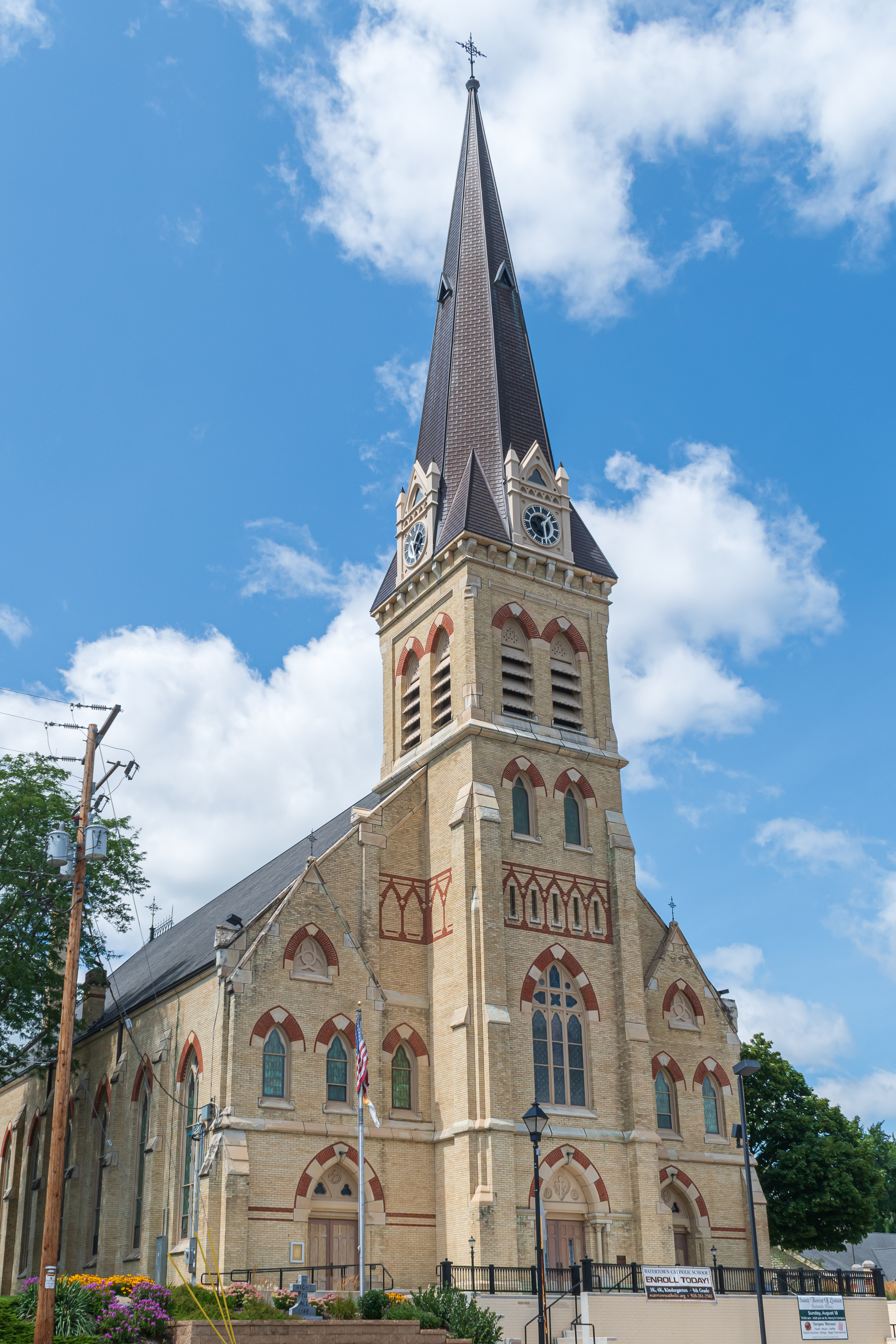
- Saint Bernard's Church Complex
- Location: Watertown, Wisconsin
- Built: 1873
- Architectural style: Victorian/Victorian Gothic
- NRHP reference No.: 03001221
- Added to NRHP: November 26, 2003

Saint Bernard's Church Complex is a Roman Catholic church, school, and rectory that occupies a full block in Watertown, Wisconsin. It was added to the National Register of Historic Places in 2003.

== History ==
St. Bernard's parish was organized in 1843, when Wisconsin was a territory. In 1846 a modest 27 by 36-foot wooden church with Gothic Revival styling was constructed for the parish on the site of the current church. Watertown was largely populated by German and Irish immigrants, and St. Bernard's attracted many of the Irish minority. A rectory was added in 1847 and a church school building in 1857.

By the 1872 the parish needed a larger building, and the Holy Cross Fathers sent Reverend William Corby to St. Bernard's as pastor, charged with getting a new church built. Corby commissioned Patrick Keely, architect of many Catholic churches out east, to design the new church. Keely designed the building which stands to this day. It was built from 1873 to 1876 with money and sweat of the parishioners. The cornerstone, laid in 1873, was carved from a piece of the Rock of Cashel, from back in dear old Erin.

Keely designed the church in High Victorian Gothic style, characterized by the emphasis on vertical lines, the pointed-topped arches, and the polychromatic masonry. The floor plan is generally rectangular, with a large square entrance tower at the front and a polygonal apse at the back. The foundation is limestone blocks; the walls above are cream brick with contrasting bands of red brick and stone. On the front tower is a spire with clocks on its four faces. That spire rises to 210 feet, and is topped with a cross. Inside, the apse still contains stained glass windows from the 1870s. In the 1890s German immigrant Hermann Michalowski painted large murals of St. Francis, St. Bernard, St. Patrick, and St. Elizabeth on panels in the apse.

In 1883 a new rectory (later used as a convent) was built to replace the old one. It was initially two-story and brick with some Italianate details. Later additions have obscured much of the original building, but the interesting roof-line and the iron cresting on the bay window remain.

In 1892 a larger school building was built to replace the original. It is a two-story building, with round arches suggesting the Romanesque Revival style. The building is cream brick, with a two-story entry pavilion with corner cylinders like the rolls of a scroll, topped with a stone cross. The school building was largely paid for by Dr. Edward Johnson and the building contractor was Mat Franzen. The school building is the last surviving historic parochial school building in a city where in the late 1800s two thirds of the students attended parochial schools.
