= Auguste Lemonnier =

Catholic priest

The Reverend Auguste Lemonnier C.S.C.
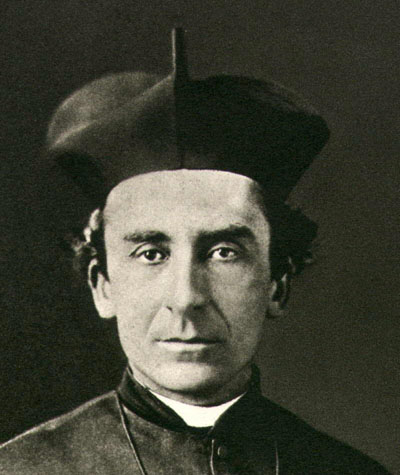

4th President of the University of Notre Dame
- In office 1872–1874
- Preceded by: William Corby
- Succeeded by: Patrick Colovin

Personal details
- Born: April 12, 1839 Ahuillé, France
- Died: October 29, 1874 (aged 35) Notre Dame, Indiana
- Resting place: Holy Cross Cemetery, Notre Dame, Indiana

Auguste Lemonnier, C.S.C. (April 12, 1839 – October 29, 1874) was a French-American Catholic priest who served as president of the University of Notre Dame from 1872 to 1874.

== Early life and education ==
The nephew of Fr Edward Sorin, he traveled from France to Notre Dame in February 1861, where he completed his seminary studies and was ordained a priest on November 4, 1863. At Notre Dame, he was Prefect of Discipline (1863-1865) and Prefect of Religion (1865-1866).

== President of the University of Notre Dame ==
During his tenure as president and vice-president, Lemonnier strengthened the university's curriculum by adding more courses and faculty in math and the sciences. He began construction of the university library (now Bond Hall), which was named in his honor. He was amicable and beloved by the student body for his closeness to the needs of students. He died in office, at the young age of thirty five.
