= Chaplain Corby of Gettysburg =

Sculpture by Samuel Murray

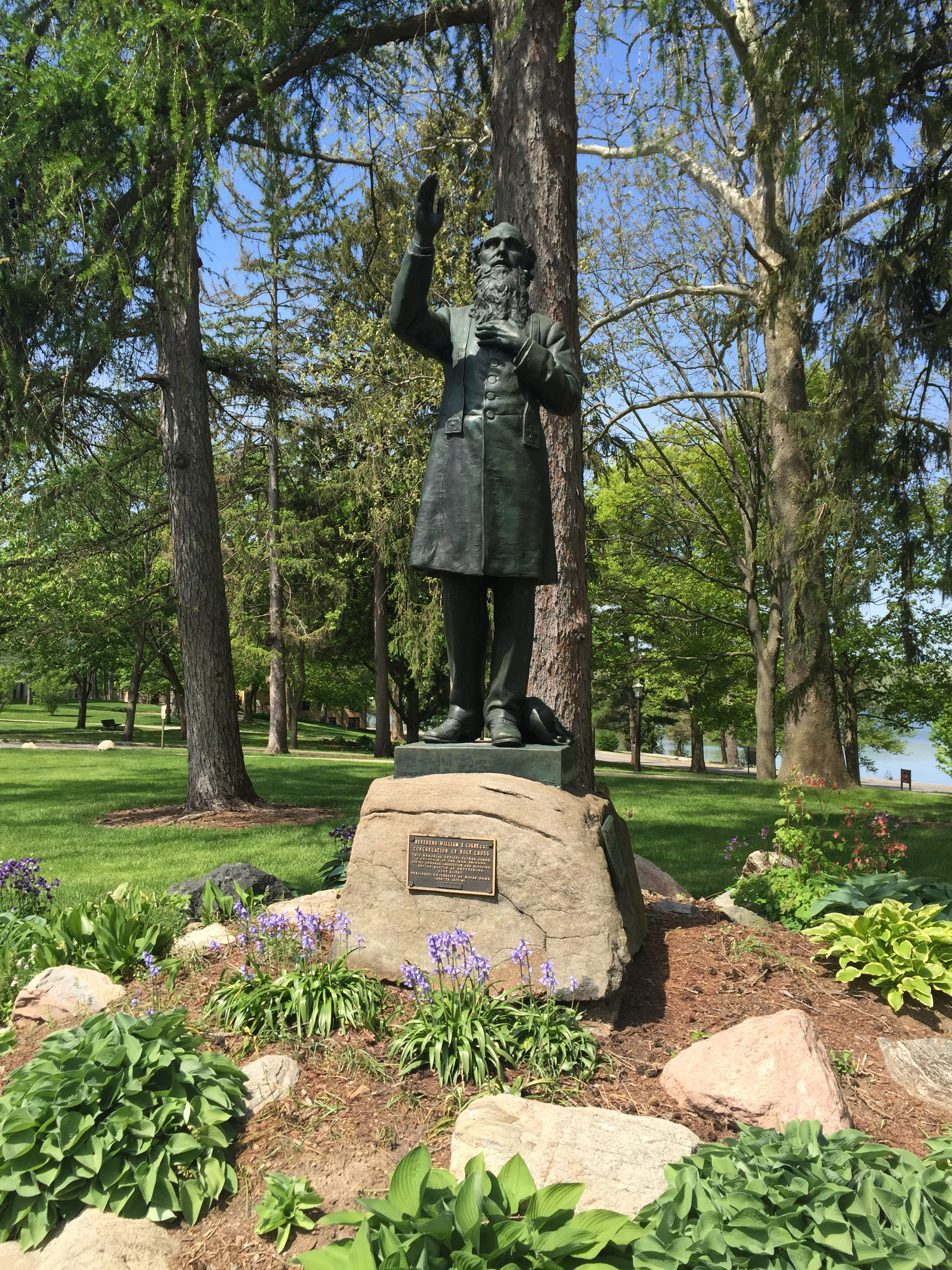
- Artist: Samuel Murray
- Year: 1911
- Type: Bronze
- Dimensions: 280 cm × 130 cm × 130 cm (110 in × 53 in × 53 in)
- Location: University of Notre Dame, Notre Dame, Indiana, United States; 41°42′08″N 86°14′27″W

Chaplain Corby of Gettysburg, commonly referred to as Fair Catch Corby, is an outdoor sculpture by American artist Samuel Murray on the University of Notre Dame campus in Notre Dame, Indiana. The sculpture, made of bronze and limestone, depicts Fr. William Corby giving absolution to soldiers at the Battle of Gettysburg. Commissioned in 1910, the sculpture is located in front of Corby Hall and is owned by the University of Notre Dame.

== Description ==
Chaplain Corby of Gettysburg is an outdoor sculpture in front of Corby Hall on the campus of the University of Notre Dame. The sculpture depicts Father Corby giving general absolution to the soldiers of the Union Army's Irish Brigade on July 2, 1863. The sculpture is a replica of Samuel Murray's Father William Corby on Cemetery Ridge on the Gettysburg Battlefield. The bronze figure of Father Corby stands atop a limestone boulder brought to Notre Dame from the Gettysburg National Battlefield. The work was dedicated on May 30, 1911, as a part of a Notre Dame Decoration Day celebration.

== Historical Information ==
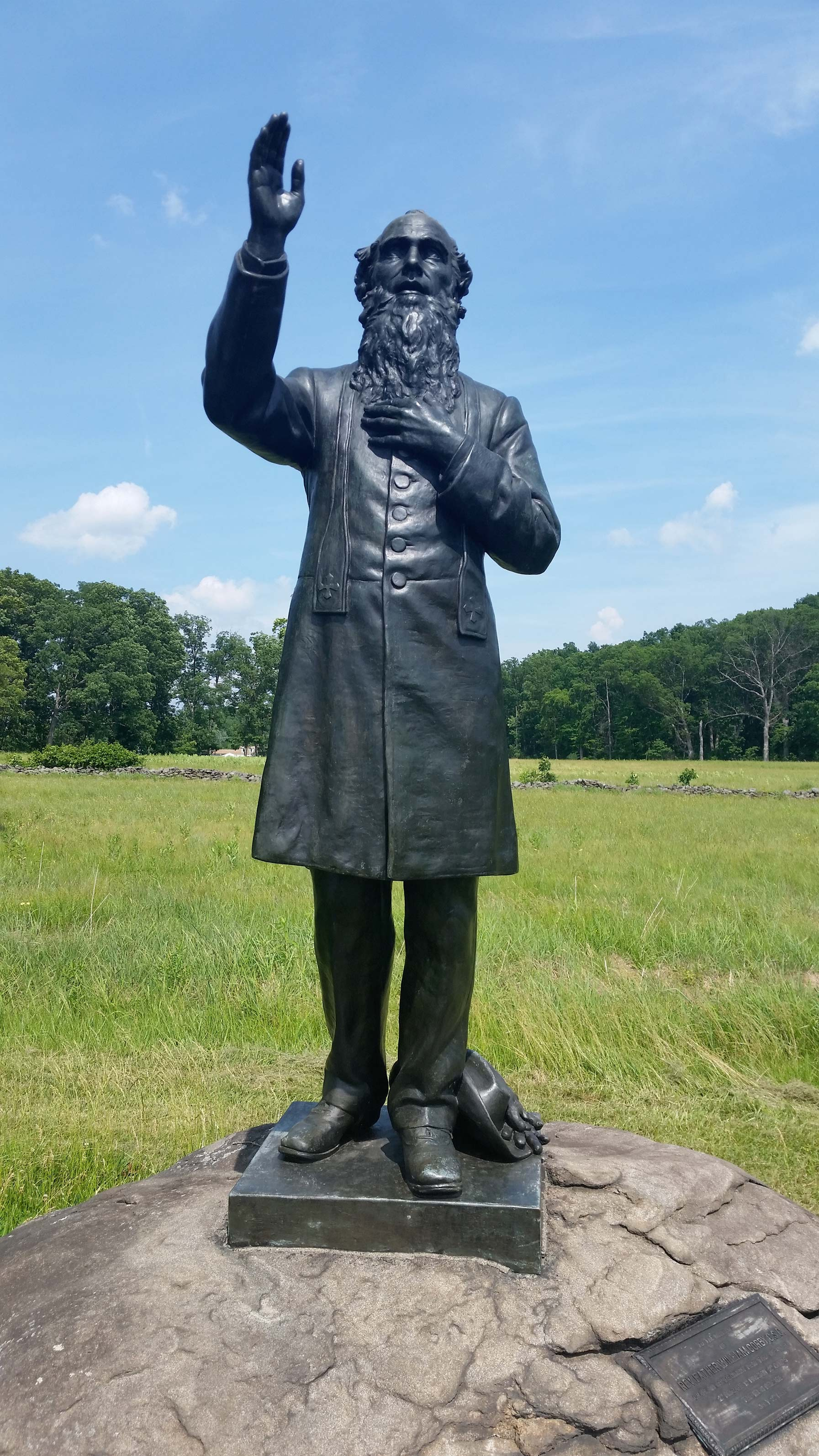
Father William Corby (1910), by Samuel Murray, Gettysburg Battlefield. The statue stands atop the same boulder on which Father Corby stood while granting absolution to troops on the second day of the battle.

=== Father Corby at Gettysburg ===
During the Civil War, Father William Corby was chaplain of the 88th New York Infantry, one of the five original regiments in the Union Army's Irish Brigade. On July 2, 1863, the second day of the Battle of Gettysburg, the Irish Brigade was preparing to enter battle when Father Corby stood on a boulder and began giving the soldiers general absolution. As Father Corby recounted in his memoir, Memoirs of Chaplain Life: "That general absolution was intended for all – in quantum possum – not only for our brigade, but for all, North or South, who were susceptible of it and who were about to appear before their Judge."

The scene of the absolution is represented in Paul Wood's 1891 painting, Absolution Under Fire, which is on display at Notre Dame's Snite Museum of Art. The painting helped shape historical understanding of the absolution as a dramatic, heroic, and sacred event.

=== Gettysburg Sculpture ===
General St. Clair Mulholland, president of the Gettysburg Memorial Commission and a member of the Irish Brigade, began the movement for the installation of a tribute to Corby at Gettysburg as early as the 1890s. He did not manage to raise much money through his initial efforts. In January 1909, The Catholic Alumni Sodality of Philadelphia proposed the creation of a monument to Father Corby on the Gettysburg National Battlefield. The archbishops of New York City, Philadelphia, and Baltimore also supported the proposal. They sought contributions from Notre Dame alumni and veterans of the battle to pay for the work, with the cost estimated at $7,000.

These groups commissioned Samuel Murray, a sculptor from Philadelphia, to complete the project. After the death of Mulholland in February 1910, Henry A. Daily of the Catholic Sodality of Philadelphia took control of the project. Murray completed a first model of the project on March 3, 1910, but the committee denied the model, as Murray depicted Father Corby in military officer's attire, rather than chaplain's attire. The final sculpture, Father William Corby, was dedicated on October 29, 1910.

On the 25th, 50th, 100th, and 150th anniversary of the absolution, priests from Notre Dame, including Father Theodore Hesburgh and Father John Jenkins, celebrated the Catholic Mass at Gettysburg. The Notre Dame Club of Gettysburg organized the 150th anniversary Mass at the statue.

=== Acquisition of Sculpture at Notre Dame ===
On March 10, 1911, the residents of Corby Hall submitted a proposal to the university administration to obtain a replica of Father William Corby in Gettysburg to "call attention to the historic merits of a great alumnus and official of the University." The proposal stated that the residents would collect the necessary $1,500 from members of the student body. The residents of Corby Hall would also oversee the sculpture's installation and unveiling. University president Father John W. Cavanaugh, who attended the dedication of the sculpture in Gettysburg, endorsed the effort. The student newspaper, Notre Dame Scholastic published weekly fundraising updates with the names of each donor for the following three months. By June 1911, the Corby Monument Fund raised $848 with 132 donations from students, alumni, and others. The university funded the remaining sum.

The university held a Decoration Day unveiling event on May 30, 1911, with addresses from General John C. Black, former Commander-in-Chief of the Grand Army of the Republic and Father John P. Chadwick.

== Artist ==
The Catholic Alumni Sodality of Philadelphia chose Samuel Murray, a Roman Catholic and son of Irish immigrants, to sculpt the piece. Murray had been the student of Thomas Eakins and was one of the preeminent sculptors in Philadelphia at the time.

== Condition ==
The area surrounding the sculpture is annually decorated with flowers and flags on July 2 to commemorate the anniversary of Father Corby's absolution. The sculpture is popularly known as "Fair Catch Corby."

== See also ==
- List of public art in St. Joseph County, Indiana
- List of presidents of the University of Notre Dame
- Samuel Murray
