= Matthew F. Colovin =

First professor of law at the University of Notre Dame

Matthew F. Colovin was the first professor of law at the University of Notre Dame and the first "principal" of the law department (forerunner of Notre Dame Law School), serving during the 1868–69 academic year.

== Early life ==
Matthew was born in Ireland in 1840 and emigrated with his family to London, Ontario, Canada as a young boy. He received a law degree from the Collège Sainte-Marie de Montréal (now part of the Université du Québec à Montréal) and was admitted to the bar for Upper Canada in June 1861. Colovin maintained a solo practice in London, Ontario for the several years after receiving his law degree.

== At Notre Dame ==
Colovin emigrated to the U.S. through Port Huron, Michigan on September 12, 1868. He arrived at the University of Notre Dame in September 1868 and served initially as an instructor of French. In October 1868 the university authorized the establishment of a law department and asked Colovin and Prof. William Ivers to establish the curriculum. Law classes began at Notre Dame in February 1869, with Colovin serving as the sole Professor of Law.

== After Notre Dame ==
Colovin departed at the conclusion of the 1868–69 academic year and relocated to Vicksburg, Mississippi. He taught French as a private tutor until 1872, when he was admitted to practice law in Mississippi.

On October 2, 1885, Colovin shot and killed Dan Steel, an African American man, in Sunflower County, Mississippi. Newspaper accounts note the likelihood that both men had been drinking. Colovin was charged with murder but despite the “almost universal opinion of all who closely followed the evidence in the case [and] regarded a conviction as beyond question,” was acquitted.

In 1888 Colovin was charged with violating liquor laws in Vicksburg. The State agreed not to prosecute, and shortly thereafter, Colovin relocated to Louisville, Kentucky.

In 1892 Colovin was admitted to the bar of the Jefferson County Circuit Court in Louisville. Sometime thereafter he was affiliated with the Abbey of Our Lady of Gethsemani.

Due to continued problems with alcohol, Colovin was involuntarily committed to the Central Kentucky Asylum for the Insane on May 21, 1900. He died there on June 17, 1900.

== Family ==
Matthew Colovin's brother, Rev. Patrick J. Colovin, served as the fifth president of the University of Notre Dame years after Matthew's departure from the university.
