= Sacred Heart of Jesus statue (University of Notre Dame) =

Statue in Notre Dame, Indiana, U.S.

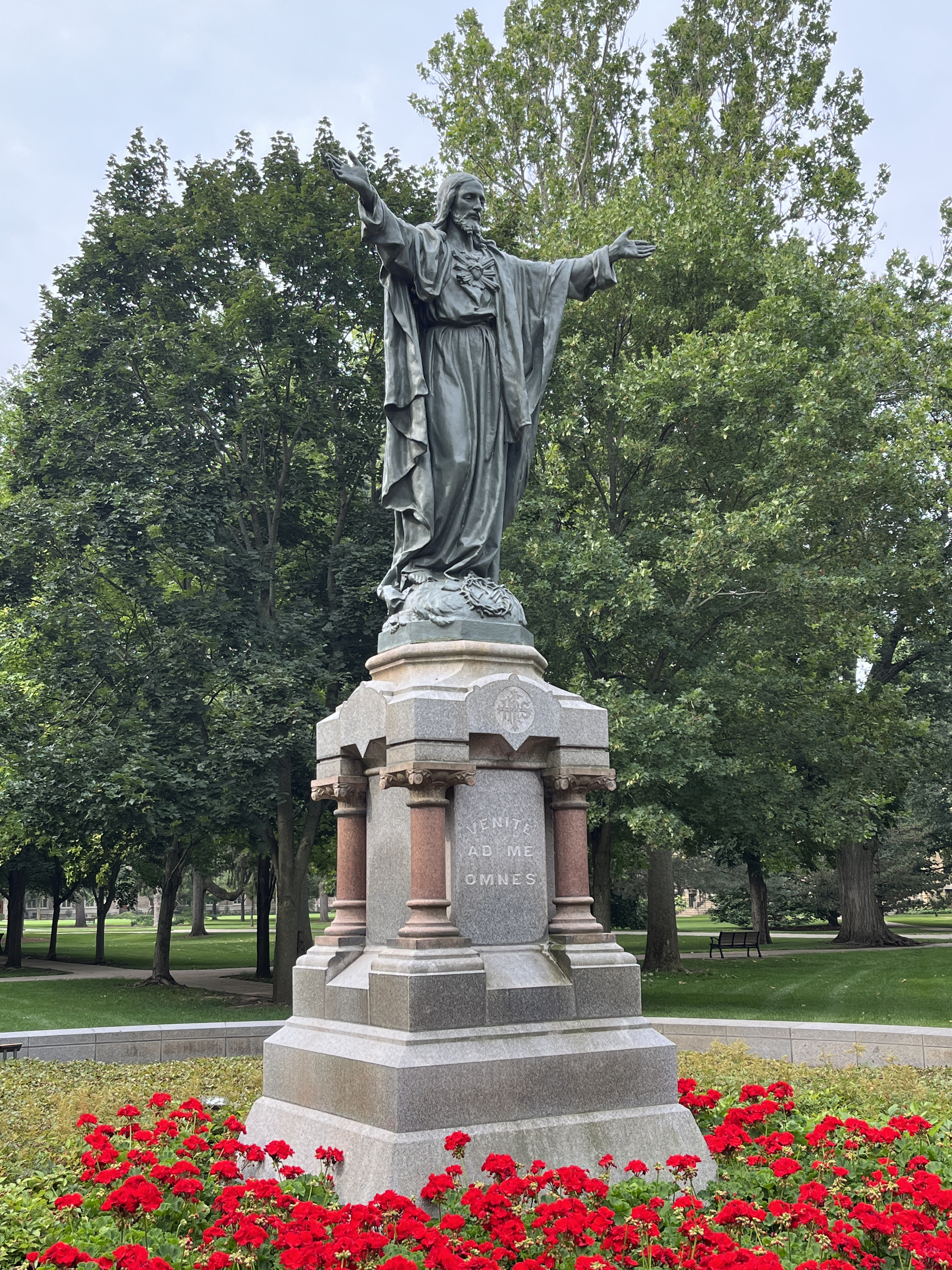
- The statue in 2023
- Location: Notre Dame, Indiana, U.S.; 41°42′6.5″N 86°14′20.1″W

The Sacred Heart of Jesus statue is installed on the University of Notre Dame campus, in Notre Dame, Indiana.

== Description and history ==
The statue represents the Sacred Heart of Jesus. It was sculpted by Robert Cassiani and dedicated during the 1893 commencement exercises. it represents Jesus and the inscription translates to "Come to me everyone". It was modeled after the statue of the Sacred Heart by Gabriel Thomas, which stood at the Montmartre basilica until 1900. It faces the lady on the golden dome. It underwent restoration in 2013.

== See also ==
- List of public art in St. Joseph County, Indiana
