= Notre Dame Fieldhouse =

Arena in Indiana

- Location within Indiana
- Location: Notre Dame, IN
- Coordinates: 41°42′8.2764″N 86°14′2.16″W
- Owner: University of Notre Dame
- Field size: 180' x 100'

Construction
- Opened: 1898
- Closed: 1968
- Demolished: 1983

Notre Dame Fieldhouse was a 4,000-seat multi-purpose arena in Notre Dame, Indiana. It opened in 1898, and was demolished in 1983. A monument marks the site.

== History ==
It was home to the University of Notre Dame Fighting Irish basketball team. It was no longer used for athletics after the Joyce Center opened in 1968. President Franklin D. Roosevelt addressed a special University convocation in the fieldhouse on December 9, 1935.

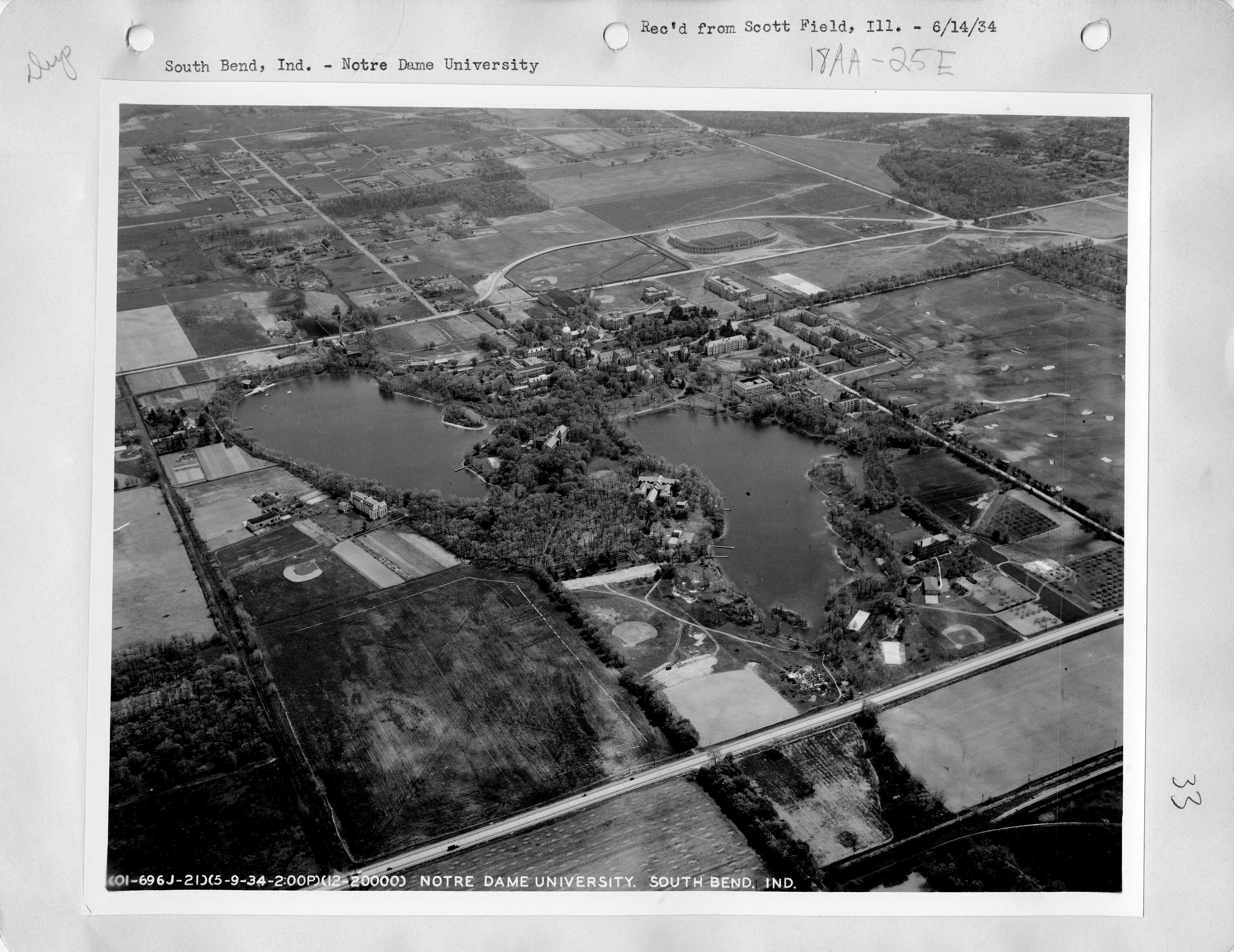
The fieldhouse in 1934

The original Notre Dame Fieldhouse was built in April 1898 under the university's president, Rev. Andrew Morrissey. However, in 1899 the Fieldhouse burned down. Father Morrissey quickly ordered that the Fieldhouse be rebuilt and made fireproof. The Fieldhouse was used as the home of Notre Dame Athletics for seventy years. Not only was the Fieldhouse used for basketball, but also football practice, pep rallies, track and field, the Bengal Bouts boxing tournament, commencement and much more. After the Joyce Center was built in 1968, the Old Fieldhouse was no longer needed for athletics, and it was turned over to the art department to use for studio projects. The Old Fieldhouse was demolished in spring 1983. Rev. Theodore Hesburgh, the president of the university, decided that the space would be used as a pedestrian space to further beautify the campus. Where the Notre Dame Fieldhouse used to be there is now the Clarke Memorial Fountain (a memorial to honor those who gave their lives in World War II, the Korean Conflict and the Vietnam War—it was built in 1986) and the marker in the corner of the quad. The space is known as the Fieldhouse Mall.

== Marker ==
The Old Fieldhouse is memorialized by a historical marker standing in the southwest corner of the Fieldhouse Mall. The Notre Dame Fieldhouse was a multi-purpose arena used for various athletics but mainly used for basketball. The marker consists of the remnants of the southwest corner from the original Fieldhouse. The historical marker is made of yellow Notre Dame bricks left from the structure and the stone that states the year that the Notre Dame Fieldhouse was built (1898).

Notre Dame Old Fieldhouse
- Year: 1968
- Type: Brick
- Dimensions: 84 inches x 84 inches x 84 inches
- Location: University of Notre Dame, Notre Dame, Indiana, United States; 41°25′38″N 86°08′29″W
- Owner: University of Notre Dame

The marker stands at 84 inches x 84 inches x 84 inches. The bottom base is made out of limestone, the middle and main portion consists of original Notre Dame brick, and the top of the marker is concrete. The Notre Dame Old Fieldhouse has plaques that commemorate specific events that took place inside the original Fieldhouse. One plaque honors a convocation given by President Roosevelt in the Fieldhouse on December 9, 1935. It reads, "Site of NOTRE DAME FIELDHOUSE where varsity and intramural athletes shook down the thunder for seventy years 1898-1968. PRESIDENT FRANKLIN D. ROOSEVELT addresses a special University convocation in the Fieldhouse December 9, 1935. The building was razed in 1983." The other plaque pays tribute to the Notre Dame Collegiate Jazz Festival that originated in the Fieldhouse on April 11, 1959. It reads, "THE OLD FIELDHOUSE birthplace of THE UNIVERSITY OF NOTRE DAME COLLEGIATE JAZZ FESTIVAL April 11, 1959. "The oldest, most prestigious and acclaimed event of its kind.""

=== Marker acquisition ===
The monument was created when the Fieldhouse was torn down in 1983. The Southwest corner of the Fieldhouse was carefully preserved for this purpose while the building was being destroyed. Many of the other bricks that made up the rest of the fieldhouse were sold upon removal by the university.

=== Condition ===
The old bricks are in frail shape and students at the university have carved initials and small phrases into the brick. The University of Notre Dame has tried to combat vandalism of the marker but ultimately cannot protect it at all times. The university also does not want to replace the bricks themselves as that would ruin the purpose the marker serves.

== See also ==
- Joyce Center
