= William Corby =

American Catholic priest and army chaplain

The Very Reverend William Corby C.S.C.
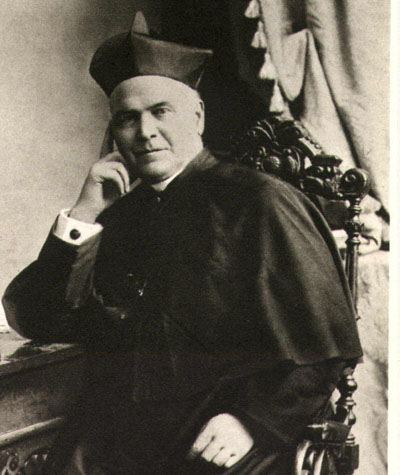

3rd President of the University of Notre Dame
- In office 1866–1872
- Preceded by: Patrick Dillon
- Succeeded by: Auguste Lemonnier
- In office 1877–1881
- Preceded by: Patrick Colovin
- Succeeded by: Thomas E. Walsh

Personal details
- Born: October 2, 1833 Detroit, Michigan, U.S.
- Died: December 28, 1897 (aged 64) South Bend, Indiana, U.S.
- Resting place: Holy Cross Cemetery, Notre Dame, Indiana

William Corby, C.S.C. (October 2, 1833 – December 28, 1897) was an American Catholic priest of the Congregation of Holy Cross and a Union Army chaplain in the American Civil War attached to the Irish Brigade. He served twice as president of the University of Notre Dame.

== Biography ==
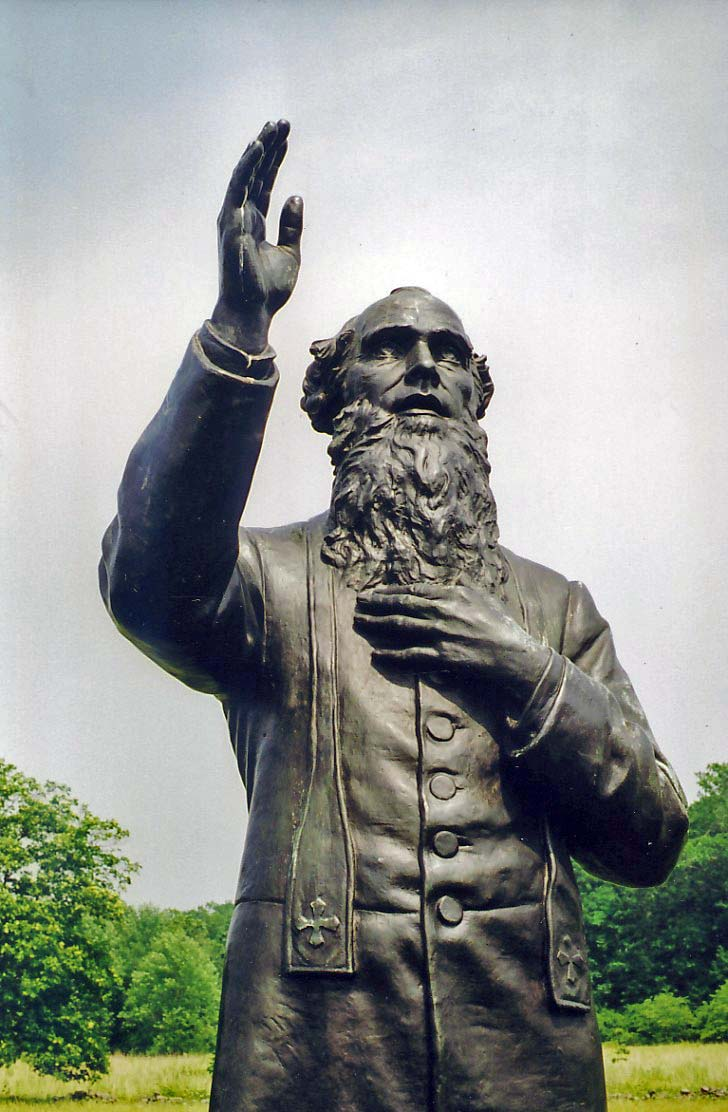
Chaplain Corby of Gettysburg (1903-10) by Samuel Murray, Gettysburg Battlefield, Gettysburg, Pennsylvania.

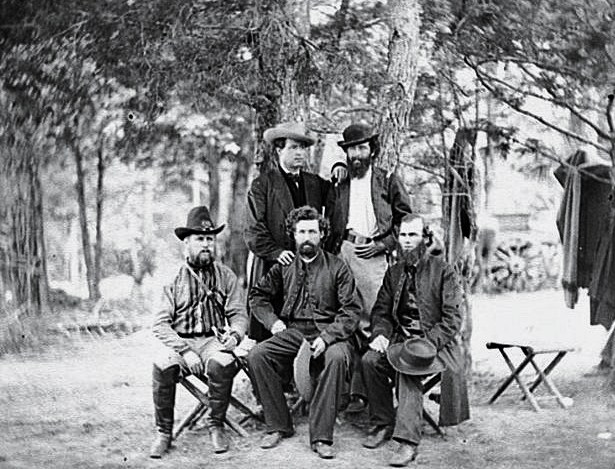
Catholic chaplains of the Irish Brigade, 1862. Corby is in the front row, right.

He was born in Detroit, Michigan, to Daniel Corby, an Irish immigrant, and his wife Elizabeth, a Canadian. He attended public school until age 16, then joined his father's real estate business. In 1853, Corby enrolled in the 10-year-old college of Notre Dame near South Bend, Indiana, and began study for the priesthood three years later. Following ordination, he taught at Notre Dame and served as a local parish priest.

== Irish Brigade ==
Corby left his position at Notre Dame and joined the predominantly Catholic Irish Brigade in 1861. He spent the next three years as chaplain of the 88th New York Infantry, which was one of the five original regiments in the Irish Brigade. His memoir of the Irish Brigade became a best-seller.

During the Battle of Antietam he rode along the line of the Brigade while giving his men a general absolution, of whom 540 became casualties before they were relieved after exhausting their supply of ammunition. After the absolution, Father Corby tended to his fallen men on the battlefield hearing their confessions where they fell. After the battle, he remained on the battlefield for several days, celebrating Mass for the wounded.

Corby gave a general absolution to the Irish Brigade on the second day of the Battle of Gettysburg. Of the Brigade's original 3,000 men, only about 500 remained. Of the men Father Corby absolved that day, 27 were killed, 109 were wounded, and 62 were listed as missing.

The scene of Fr. Corby blessing the troops was depicted in the 1891 painting Absolution under Fire by Paul Wood, and dramatized in the 1993 film Gettysburg.

A statue by Samuel Murray – Father Corby, with right hand raised in the gesture of blessing – stands upon what may be the same boulder on which the priest stood while blessing the troops that morning. It was the first statue of a non-general erected on the Gettysburg Battlefield and was dedicated in 1910.

Corby is widely remembered among military chaplains and celebrated by Irish-American fraternal organizations. Corby Hall at Notre Dame is named for him, and a copy of the Gettysburg statue stands outside the building. An organization of Notre Dame alumni is named The William Corby Society.

== President of the University of Notre Dame ==
Following his service in the Civil War, he returned to Notre Dame and served as its vice-president, 1865–66 and president twice, 1866–72 and 1877-81. Under Corby's first administration, enrollment at Notre Dame increased to more than 500 students. In 1869, Corby opened the law school, which offered a two-year course of study, and in 1871 he began construction of Sacred Heart Church, today the Basilica of the Sacred Heart, Notre Dame. The institution was still small, and Corby taught in the classroom and knew most students and faculty members. In 1869, the entire student body and the faculty presented him with the gift of a 'black horse and, when he left the presidency three years later, they presented him with a matching carriage.

Corby became president again following the short term of Fr. Patrick Colovin. When Corby returned to the presidency, Notre Dame had not yet become a significant academic institution. Corby's presidency saw the April 1879 fire that destroyed the old Main Building of the school. Corby sent all students home and promised that they would return to a "bigger and better Notre Dame." Corby overcame the $200,000 fire loss and rebuilt the Main Building - which now stands with its "Golden Dome." During his administration, he also constructed Washington Hall (then named Music Hall), in which he took much pride and started the construction of St. Edward's Hall for the minims program. In addition to his presidency, Corby was also serving as the Holy Cross Provincial when Fr. Sorin, who had become Superior General of the Congregation, wrote to him to tell him that he would have to relinquish one of his positions. Corby wanted to remain president but was overruled by Sorin.

== See also ==
- Roman Catholic Archdiocese for the Military Services, USA#Chaplains in Civil War
