= Statue of Edward Sorin =

Statue at the University of Notre Dame

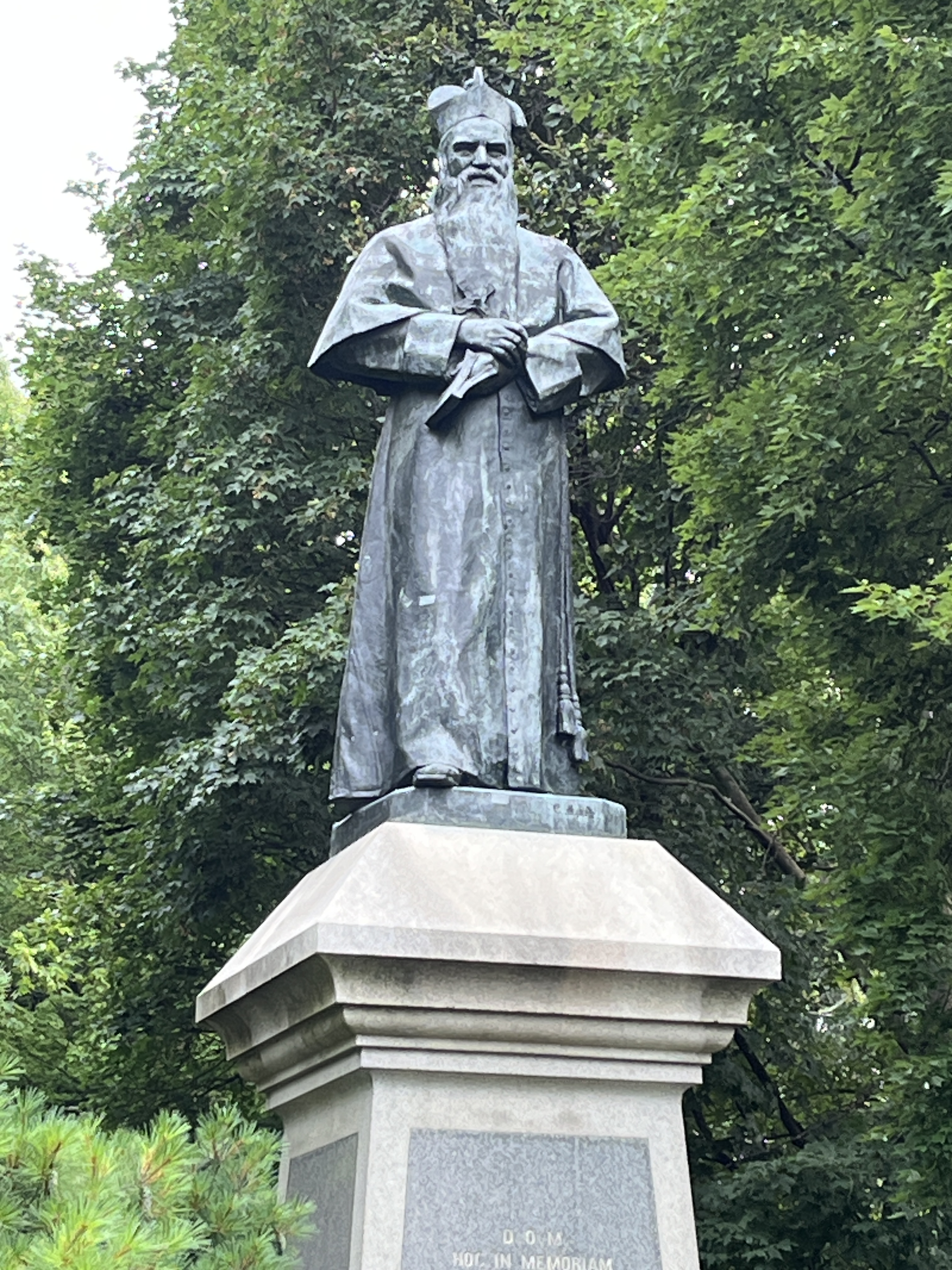
- Artist: Ernesto Biondi
- Year: May 3, 1906
- Type: Bronze
- Dimensions: 8 ft. x 2 ft. 6 in. x 2 ft. 6 in.
- Location: University of Notre Dame; Notre Dame, Indiana, United States; 41°42′03″N 86°14′20″W
- Owner: University of Notre Dame

A statue of Edward Sorin, sometimes called Edward F. Sorin, is an outdoor sculpture by Italian sculptor Ernesto Biondi (January 30, 1855 – 1917). It is located on the University of Notre Dame campus near South Bend, Indiana. The eight-foot-tall statue depicting the founder of Notre Dame is placed on the main quadrangle of the university near the Main Building. The statue, made of bronze, was unveiled on its campus on May 3, 1906.

== Description ==
“Edward F. Sorin” is a life-sized statue composed of bronze, a favorite material of artist Ernesto Biondi. It measures 8 ft. x 2 ft. 6 in. x 2 ft. 6 in. and is mounted on top of a pedestal made of Vermont granite that reads “SORIN.” The statue depicts Sorin with a long beard wearing his priestly vestments. His arms are folded, and his right hand is grasping his left wrist. In his left hand, he holds a partially open book.

The front of the stone base that the statue sits on reads:

Latin

D.O.M.
Hoc in memoriam
Eduardi Sorin
Sup. Gen. C.S.C.
Nostrae Dominae Universitatis
Fundatoris
Qui apostolicis Virtutibus Clarus
Catholicae Americanae
Educationis Studiosissimus
VIII ID. Feb. A.D. MDCCCXIV Natus v
A.LXXVIII.M.X.VIXIT.
Discipuli, Alumni, Amici,
Venerationis, Gratitudinis,
Pignus Posuere
AN.SAL.REP. MCMV.

English translation

To God, Greatest and Best.
In Memory
of Edward Sorin,
Superior General of the Congregation of the Holy Cross,
Founder of the University of Notre Dame,
who, renowned for apostolic virtues,
most zealous for American Catholic Education,
born February 6, 1814,
lived for 78 years and ten months,
students, alumni, and friends
have erected this pledge
of their respect and gratitude
in the year of salvation regained 1905.

== Historical information ==
=== Sorin’s Role in Founding Notre Dame ===
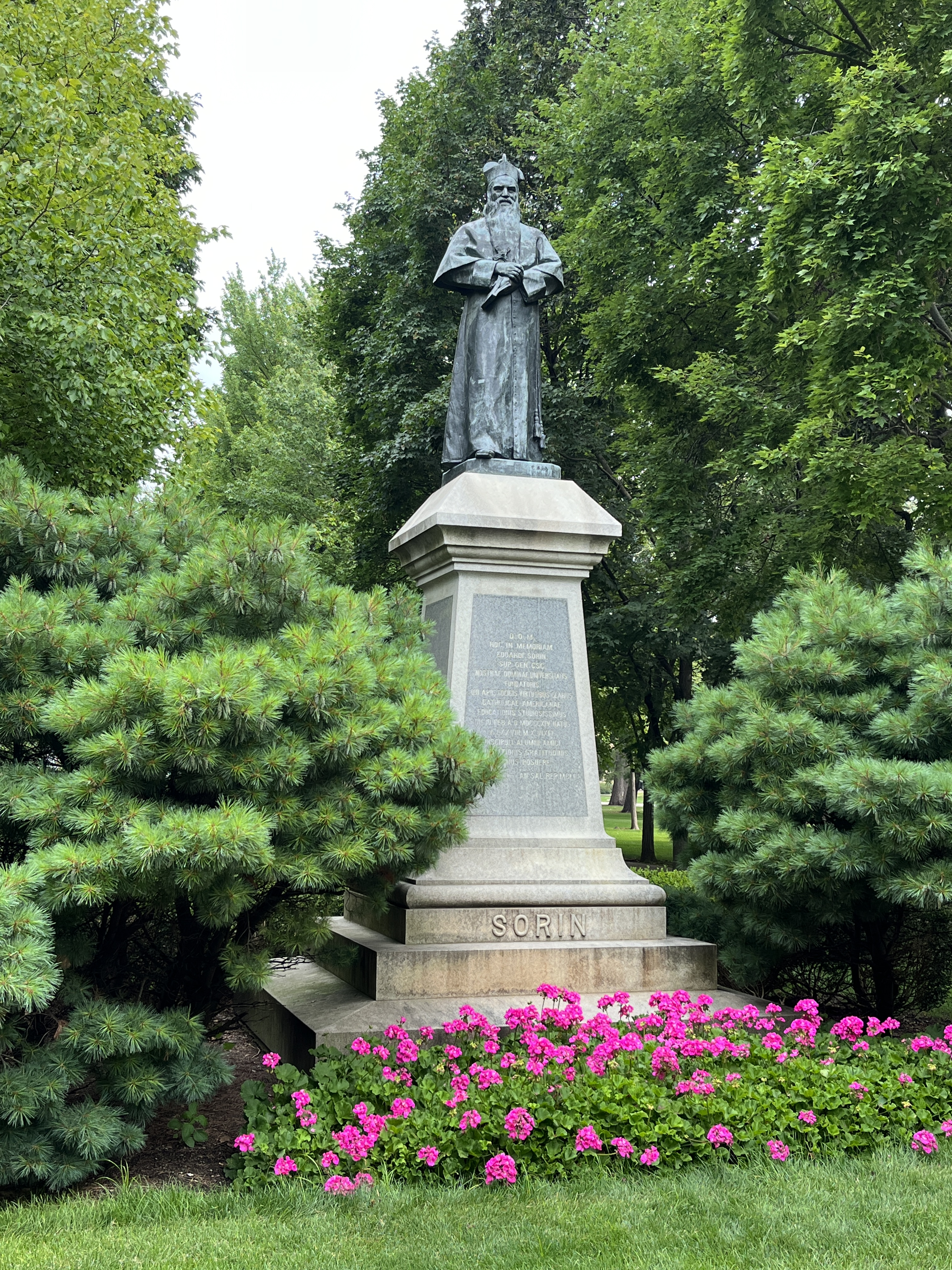
The statue in 2023

Sorin was born in February 1814 near Laval, Mayenne. Following his ordination as a priest in the Congregation of Holy Cross, he traveled as a missionary to the United States, where he worked in Indiana, which was then considered a very remote area of the nation. Accompanied by six brothers, he landed in New York and proceeded to Indiana, where he acquired possession of 524 snow-covered acres of land from the Bishop of Vincennes, Indiana. On November 26, 1842, Sorin began the foundation of the University of Notre Dame on this land.

=== Acquisition ===
The University of Notre Dame commissioned artist Ernesto Biondi to create the statue in Sorin's memory. The price of the commission was not disclosed.

=== Unveiling Ceremony ===
Before the unveiling of the monument, a Mass was celebrated on the campus of the University of Notre Dame in the Basilica of the Sacred Heart, Notre Dame. The sermon was preached by Rev. John J. Keane, D.D., Archbishop of Dubuque, and the Mass was celebrated by Rev. Bishop Alerding of Fort Wayne. Scores of visiting clergy attended, including Rev. Monsignor Oechtering. More than 100 ministers wore red and purple, and about 50 male singers were present. A quartette of seminarians sang at the offertory, and the church was filled with candles and incense. With attendees from the student body and friends of the university, the church was filled.

After Mass, a procession from the Basilica to the grounds where the statue was to be unveiled occurred. The students marched according to their respective halls. They were followed by the dignified array of graduates and faculty in cap and gown, then the acolytes and ministers, and lastly the community members and visitors. A platform was erected beside the monument, and around this stood the audience of about 3,000. The University Band provided music appropriate for the occasion.

Before the statue was revealed, it was shrouded in the American flag and the papal ensign. The then-president of Notre Dame, Father John J. Cavanaugh, offered a reflection, and a cord was pulled to reveal the statue. The crowd reacted to the statue by calling it “perfect” and “matchless.” The student body erupted in a cheer of “U.N.D.”

== Condition ==
After being surveyed in May 1993, the Indiana survey Save Outdoor Sculpture filed Edward F. Sorin as “Treatment Urgent.”

== See also ==
- List of public art in St. Joseph County, Indiana
