= Sufi Ahmad =

Sufi Ahmad صوفي احمد
- Village
- Location within Iran
- Coordinates: 37°10′24″N 47°17′54″E
- Country: Iran
- Province: East Azerbaijan
- County: Charuymaq
- Bakhsh: Shadian
- Rural District: Charuymaq-e Sharqi

Population (2006)
  - Total: 108
- Time zone: UTC+3:30 (IRST)
  - Summer (DST): UTC+4:30 (IRDT)

Sufi Ahmad (Persian: صوفي احمد, also Romanized as Şūfī Aḩmad) is a village in Charuymaq-e Sharqi Rural District, Shadian District, Charuymaq County, East Azerbaijan Province, Iran. At the 2006 census, its population was 108, in 22 families.
