= St. Joseph County Courthouse (Michigan) =

- U.S. National Register of Historic Places
- Michigan State Historic Site
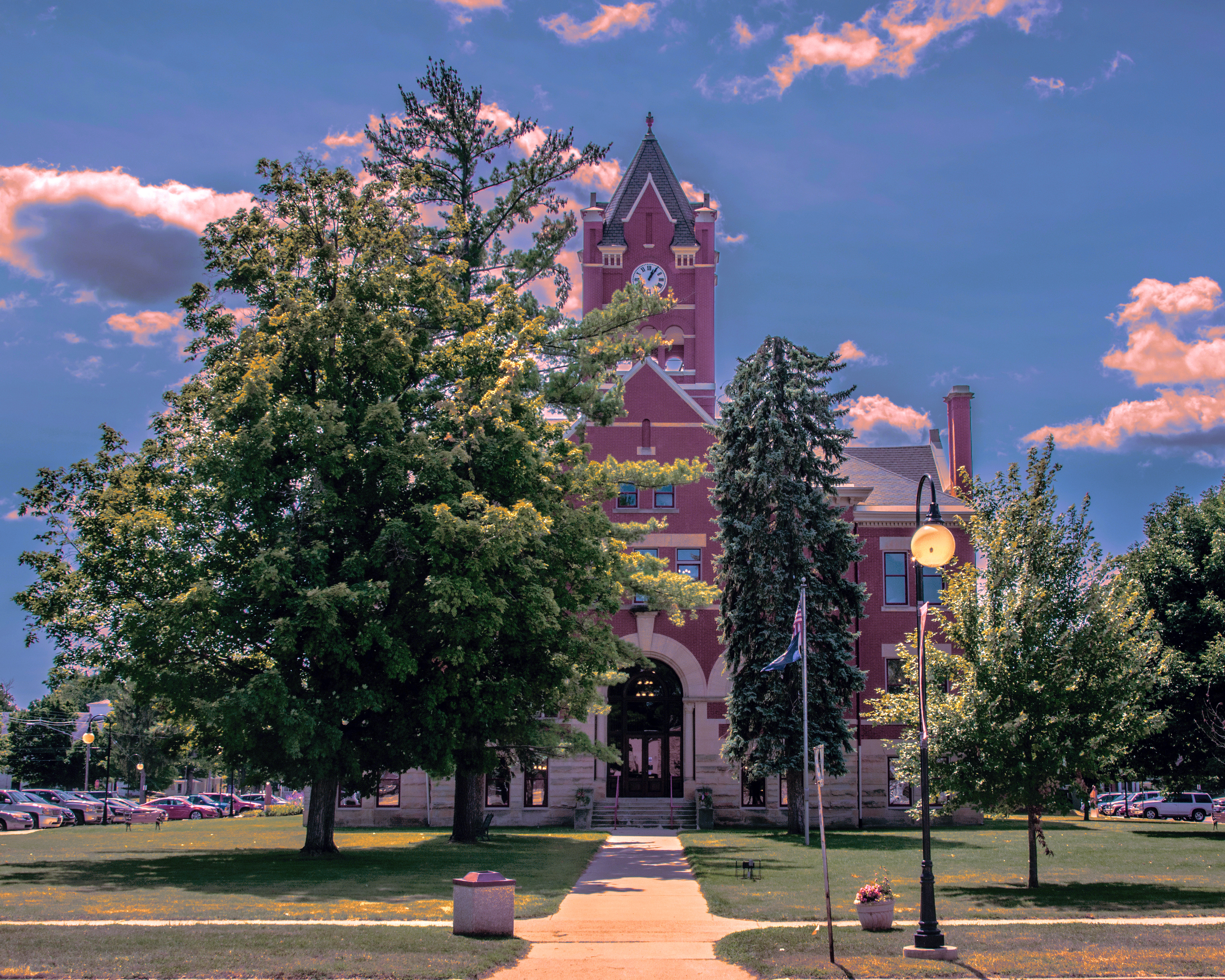

- Location within Michigan Location within the United States
- Interactive map showing the location of St Joseph County Courthouse
- Location: 125 W. Main St., Centreville, Michigan
- Coordinates: 41°55′22″N 85°31′41″W
- Area: 4 acres (1.6 ha)
- Built: 1899
- Architect: Sidney J. Osgood
- Architectural style: Richardsonian Romanesque
- NRHP reference No.: 93000984
- Added to NRHP: September 16, 1993

The St. Joseph County Courthouse is a government building located at 125 West Main Street in Centreville, Michigan. It was listed on the National Register of Historic Places in 1993.

== History ==
Centreville was first established as the county seat of St. Joseph County in 1831. The first county offices were located in a leased house. In 1841, Thomas W. Langley, donated land to the county on which to construct a courthouse and a jail, and the first county courthouse was completed the following year. In 1859, two additional office buildings were constructed. However, by the 1890s, the county buildings were becoming dilapidated, and by 1897, the need to repair or replace them had become critical. At first, the county board of supervisors adopted plans to renovate the existing courthouse, but county voters rejected the proposal. In 1899, the board adopted a plan to replace the courthouse, which was approved by voters alter that year.

A building committee was formed, and the committee selected architect Sidney J. Osgood of Grand Rapids to design this building. Ionia contractors David C Crookshank and William H. Somers were selected to construct the building. The cornerstone of the new courthouse was laid on September 7, 1899. The construction of the courthouse was completed by August 1900, at a total cost of $34,418.90. The building served to house the local courts until the 1970s, when a new two-story building was constructed south of the old courthouse. The building is still used by the county government. In April 2026, the 1970s Courts Building was closed for renovation for an estimated 18 months, and the 3B District Court relocated to the old courthouse.

== Description ==
The Saint Joseph County Courthouse is a rectangular, three-story, Richardsonian Romanesque building, constructed of red brick with sandstone trim. The lower level is slightly below grade, and is faced with rock. The building has a hip and gable roof, and a square plan, pyramidal-roofed, arcaded center tower rises to 45 feet in height. The main entrances are to the north and east; these entrances display round-arch stone detailing topped by keystones. A glass-enclosed passageway to the south of the courthouse connects to the Courts Building.

On the interior, each floor is laid out in a T pattern, with the principal staircases located near the two entrances.

== See also ==
- National Register of Historic Places listings in St. Joseph County, Michigan
