= Samuel Murray (sculptor) =

American sculptor and educator (1869–1941)

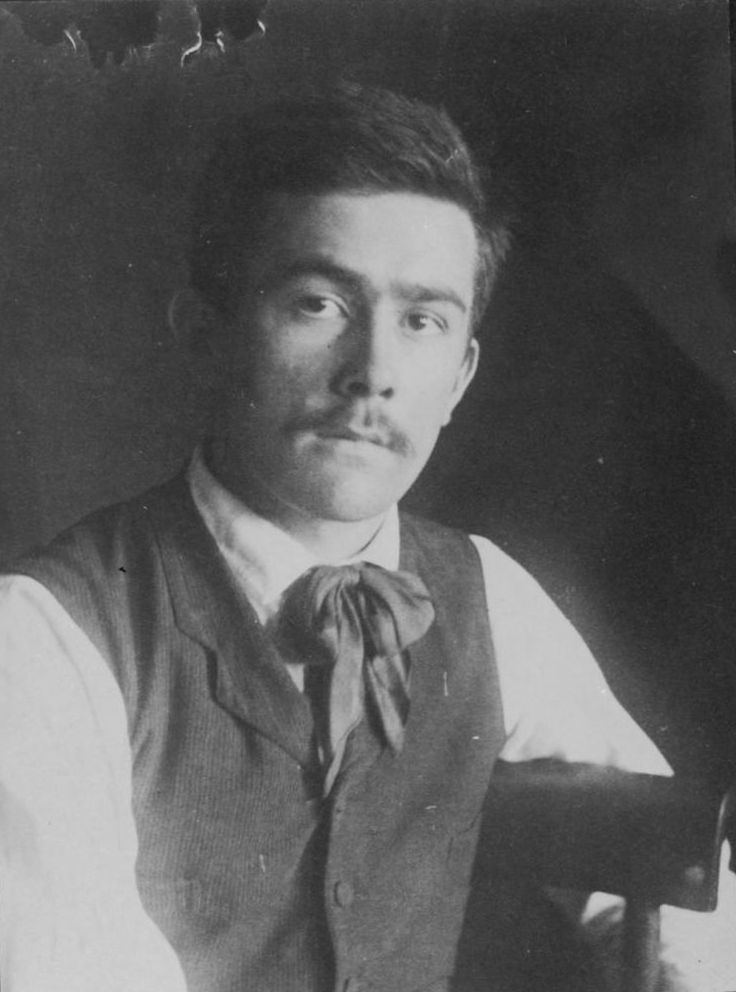
Samuel Murray, c. 1890, Circle of Thomas Eakins, Hirshhorn Museum and Sculpture Garden

Samuel Aloysius Murray (June 12, 1869 – November 3, 1941) was an American sculptor, educator, and protégé of the painter Thomas Eakins.

== Murray and Eakins ==
Samuel Murray was born in Philadelphia, Pennsylvania, the 11th of the 12 children of Irish stonemason William Murray and his wife, Margaret (née Hannigan), the daughter of a linen merchant. He was educated in the city's public and parochial schools. In September 1886, at age 17, he entered the seven-month-old Art Students' League of Philadelphia, where he studied under Eakins. He soon became a favored student, then Eakins's assistant, and was listed as an instructor at the school in 1892. The two artists shared a studio at 1330 Chestnut Street from 1892 to about 1900, sometimes painting and sculpting from the same model.

The pair spent a great deal of time together: working side by side, bicycling around Philadelphia, attending boxing matches, fishing in Gloucester, New Jersey, and taking trips and vacations together. Murray accompanied Eakins on visits to Walt Whitman in Camden, New Jersey (across the Delaware River from Philadelphia), and following the poet's death on March 26, 1892, the pair cast a plaster death mask of his face. Murray introduced Eakins to Catholic priests at St. Charles Borromeo Seminary, and Eakins painted portraits of a number of them.

Eakins painted an 1889 portrait of Murray, and featured him in a number of paintings and photographs. Murray modeled at least three figures of Eakins. The exact nature of their relationship is the subject of speculation, but Murray remained a lifelong friend to Eakins, and helped care for the disabled painter in his old age.

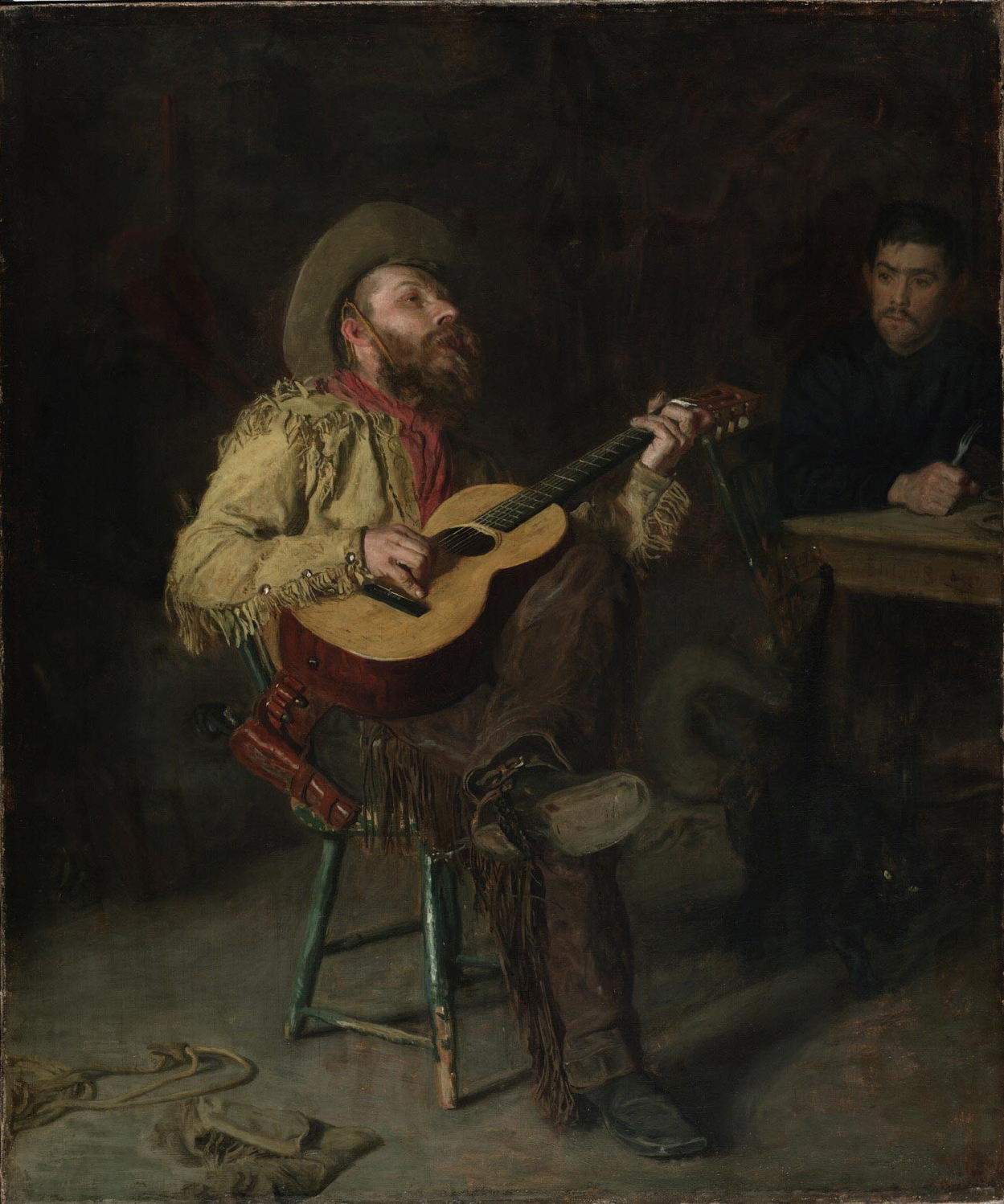
^{Philadelphia Museum of Art}
Home Ranch by Eakins (1888). Franklin L. Schenck is the cowboy; Murray is the man at right.

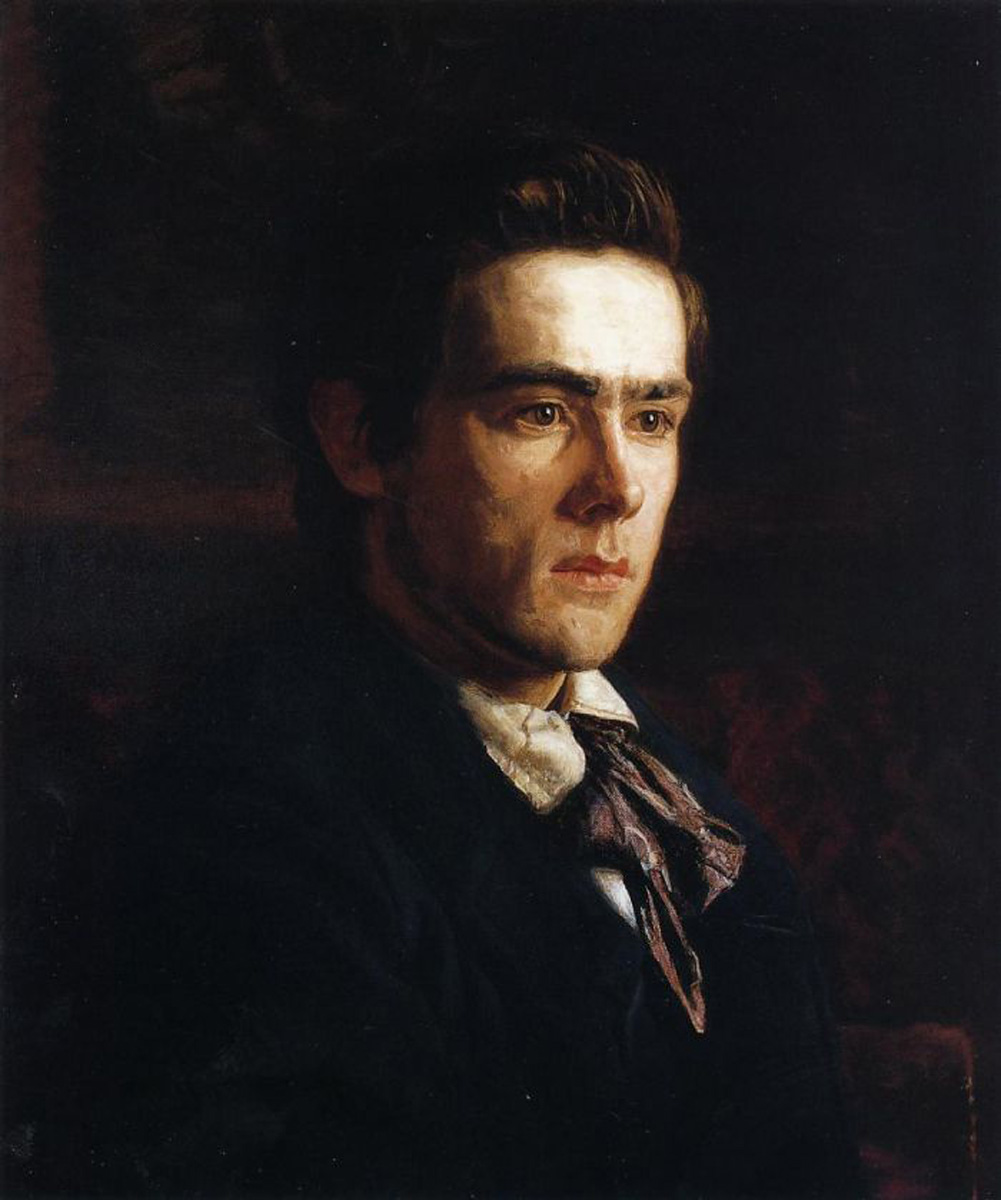
^{Mitchell Museum at Cedarhurst.}
Portrait of Samuel Murray by Eakins (1889)

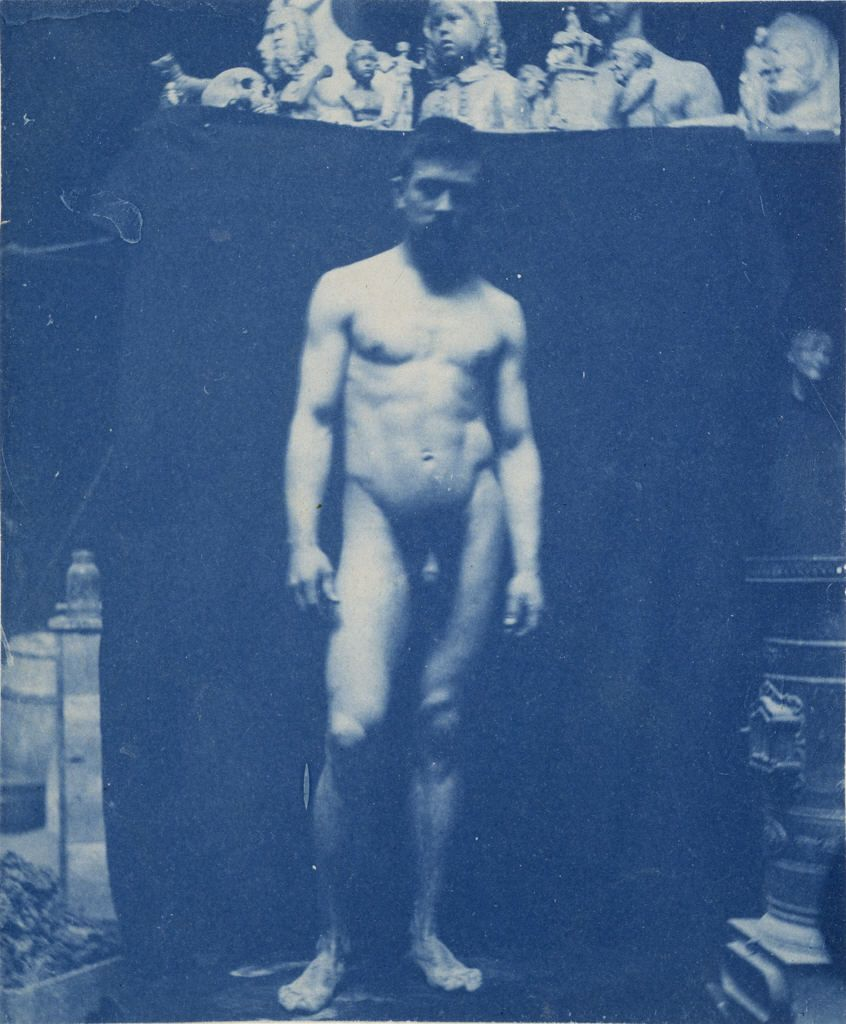
Samuel Murray, nude, in Eakins's 1330 Chestnut Street studio (circa 1892). Murray's bust of Walt Whitman (1892) is on the shelf above.

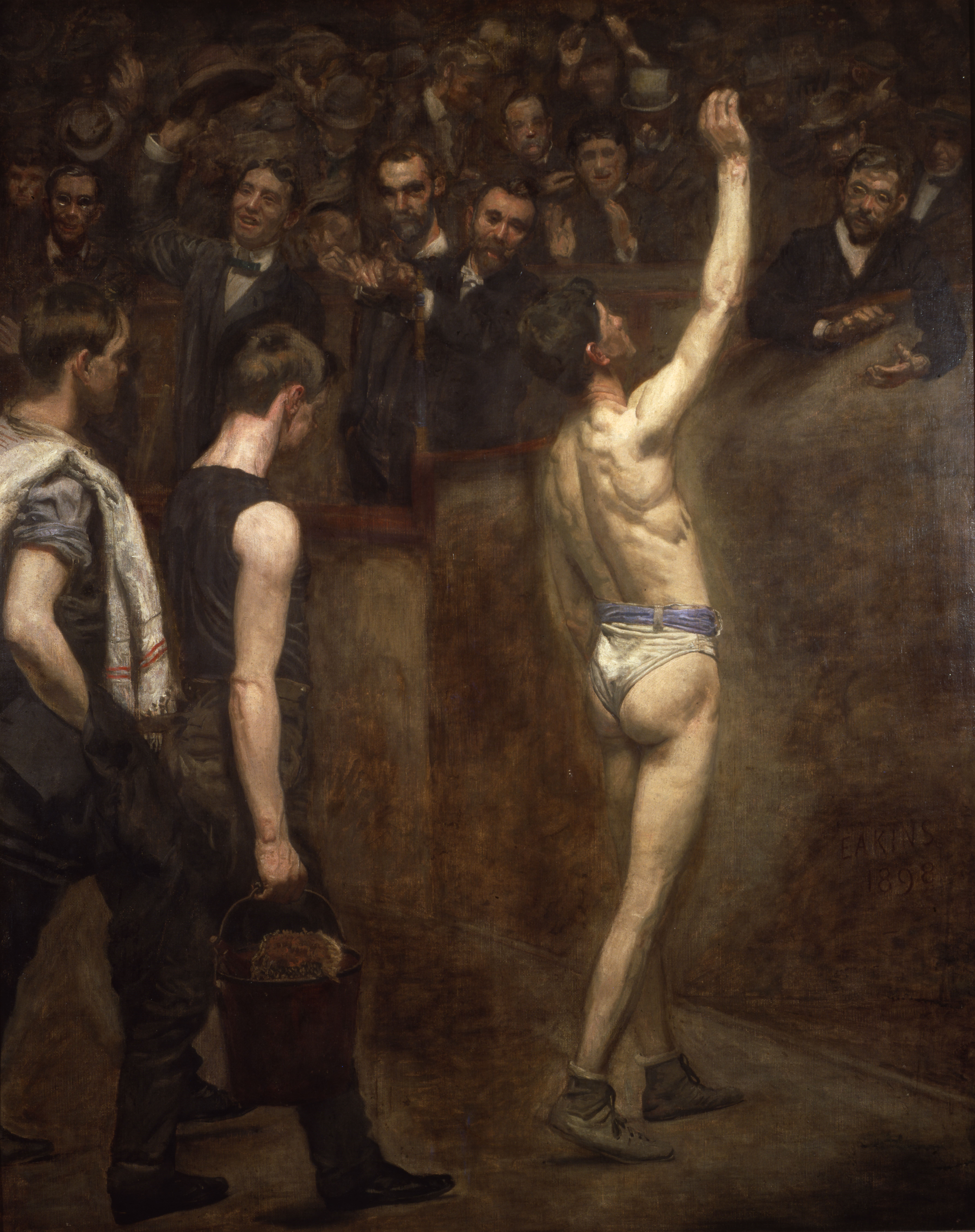
^{Addison Gallery of American Art}
Salutat by Eakins (1898). Murray is the man applauding at far right, with Benjamin Eakins (the artist's father) behind him.

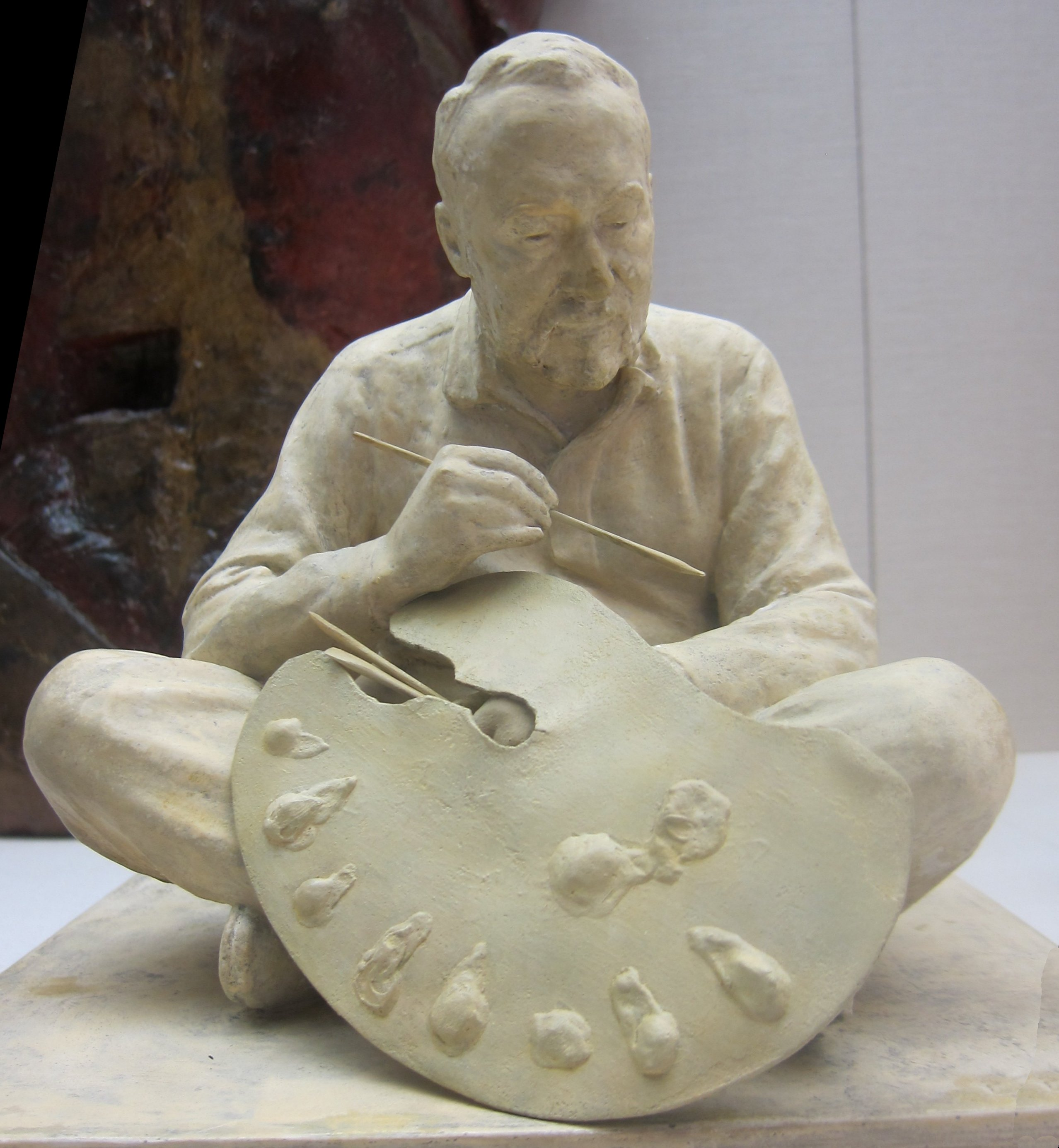
^{Pennsylvania Academy of the Fine Arts}
Statuette of Thomas Eakins Sitting by Murray (1907). This depicts Eakins at work on his 1889 painting The Agnew Clinic.

== Career ==
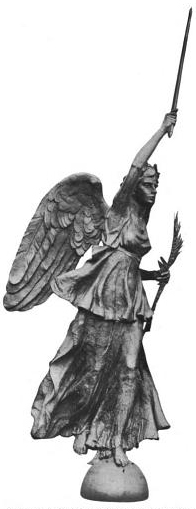
Goddess of Victory and Peace (bronze, 1909–10), Pennsylvania State Monument, Gettysburg Battlefield. Cannons were melted down to provide the bronze for the 21-foot-tall statue.

At age 21 (reportedly, on Eakins's recommendation), Murray was hired by the Philadelphia School of Design for Women (now Moore College of Art) as an instructor in clay modeling and anatomy—a position he held for over 50 years. Among his students were Edythe Ferris, Bessie Pease Gutmann, Alice Neel, Anne Parrish, Ella Peacock, and most of the Philadelphia Ten.

Between 1893 and 1933, Murray exhibited regularly at the Pennsylvania Academy of the Fine Arts. In March 1896, under the auspices of the Fairmount Park Art Association, the Pennsylvania Academy of the Fine Arts mounted a solo exhibition of his work. (He was age 27.) His first major commission came in September 1896, for ten colossal terracotta statues of Biblical prophets to adorn the facade of Philadelphia's Witherspoon Building. Eakins is rumored to have assisted on the project, and at least six of the figures were modeled on members of their "circle":

Moses: Walt Whitman (posthumous)
Isaiah: George W. Holmes (posthumous, posed for Eakins's The Chess Players)
Deborah: Susan Macdowell Eakins (Eakins's wife)
Samuel: Franklin L. Schenck (fellow student at Art Students' League of Philadelphia)
Jeremiah: William H. Macdowell (Eakins's father-in-law)
Huldah: Jennie Dean Kershaw (Murray's fiancé, and later wife)

The models for Elijah, Ezekiel, Daniel and John the Baptist have not been identified. The terracotta statues were removed from the building in 1961; only three of them survive: Moses, Elijah, and Samuel.

Over the course of half a century, Murray modeled about a dozen large sculptures in bronze, the ten Witherspoon prophets, and nearly 200 portrait busts, miniatures and statuettes. Some of the commissions – Commodore Joseph Barry (1906–08), Father William Corby (1909–10), Bishop John W. Shanahan Memorial (1916–18) – may have come through his ties to Philadelphia's Irish-Catholic community. (One of his sisters was a nun.) His work was shown frequently at PAFA's annual exhibitions from 1892 to 1933, occasionally at the National Academy of Design and the National Sculpture Society (both in New York City), and at exhibitions in the United States and the 1900 Exposition Universelle in Paris.

Murray's most ambitious commission was for work on the Pennsylvania State Memorial (1909–10), on the Gettysburg Battlefield. An immense granite pavilion, he modeled the four bas-reliefs of battle scenes over its arches, and the 21-foot-tall (originally gold-patinaed) goddess that crowns its dome. The latter seems to echo Augustus Saint-Gaudens's Sherman Memorial in Central Park, New York City, of a decade earlier.

== Personal ==
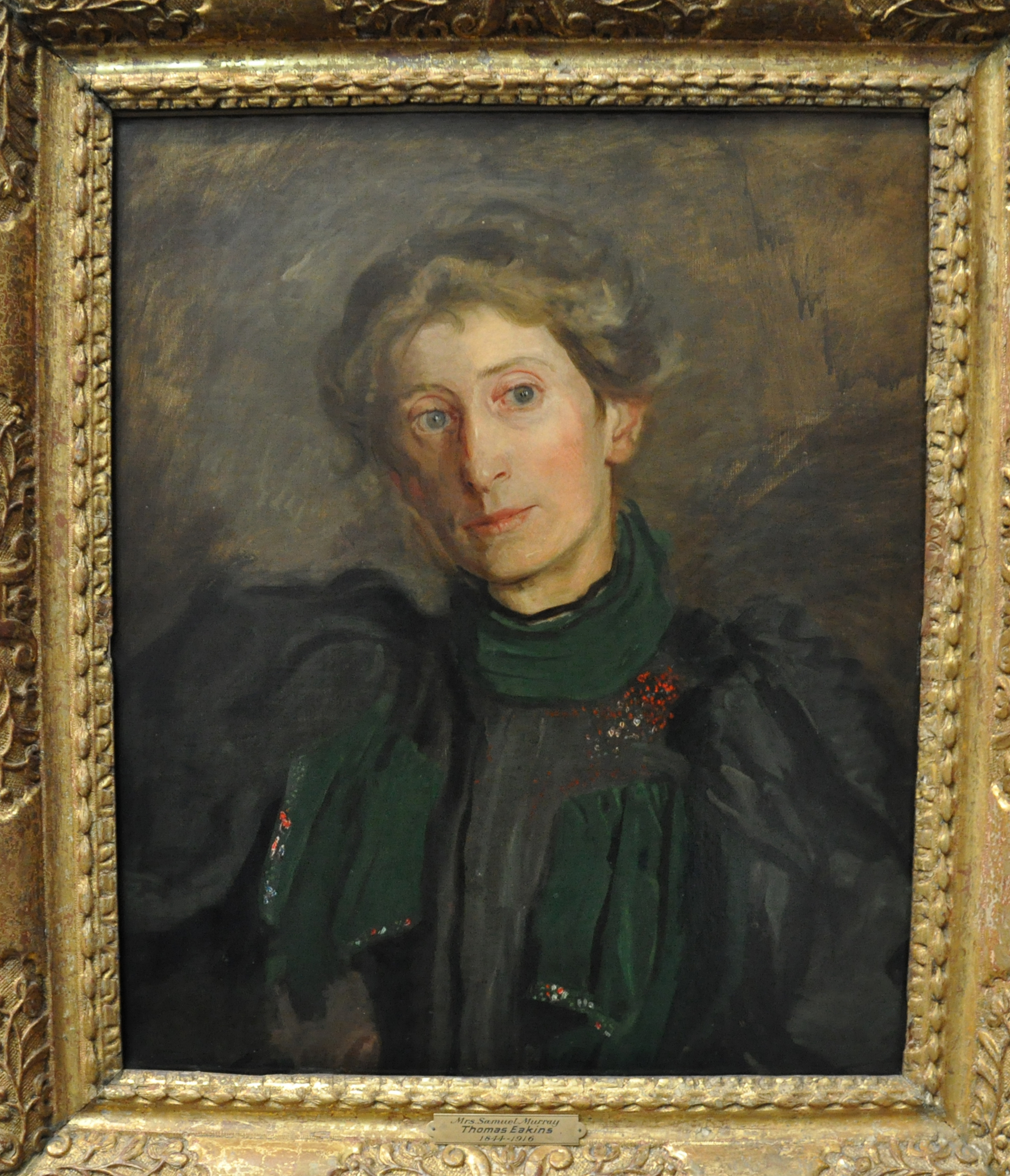
^{Baltimore Museum of Art.} Portrait of Jennie Dean Kershaw (circa 1897) by Thomas Eakins. Murray married Kershaw in 1916.

Following an engagement of nearly 20 years, Murray married illustrator Jean (Jennie) Dean Kershaw (1866–1952) in March 1916. She was a fellow instructor at the Philadelphia School of Design for Women, and had posed for one of the Witherspoon prophets in the 1890s. They had no children.

Murray died of kidney failure at his home in Philadelphia at the age of 72, and was buried near his parents at Old Cathedral Cemetery in Philadelphia. His widow donated a couple of his pieces to the Pennsylvania Academy of the Fine Arts, which also holds a collection of his papers.

A competent sculptor and a sensitive modeler of faces, Murray is remembered more for his personal ties to Eakins than his body of work. The largest collection of his sculpture is at the Hirshhorn Museum and Sculpture Garden in Washington, D.C. (although few are on display). The Hirshhorn also owns five scrapbooks of his drawings and photographs, and mounted the first retrospective exhibition of Murray's work in 1982.

== Selected works ==
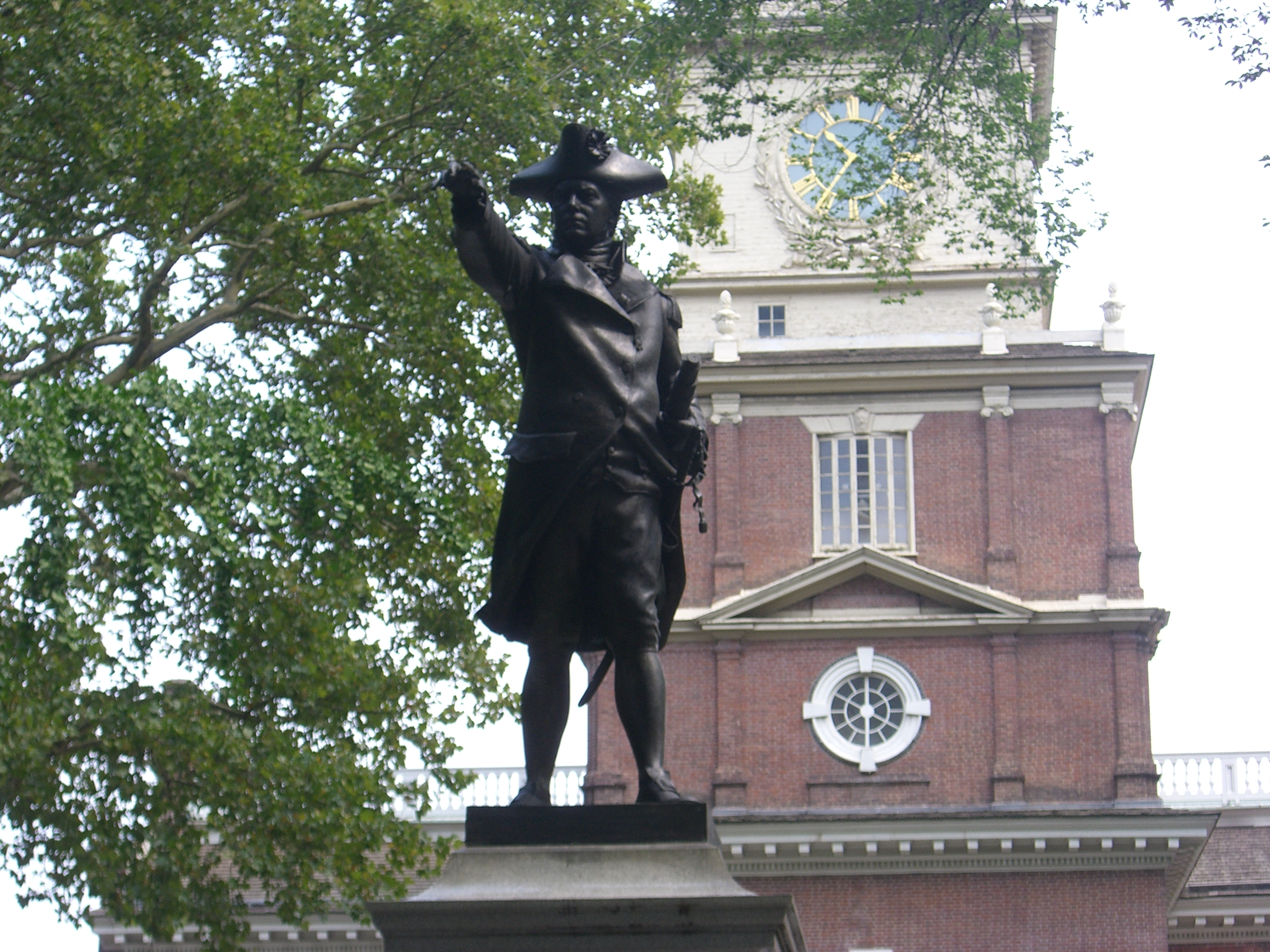
Commodore John Barry (1906–08), in the Statehouse Yard behind Independence Hall in Philadelphia

- Bust of Isaac Jones Wistar (bronze, 1890), Wistar Institute, University of Pennsylvania, Philadelphia, PA.
- Bust of Walt Whitman (plaster, 1892), Hirshhorn Museum and Sculpture Garden. Modeled from the death mask of Whitman made by Murray and Eakins.
- Bust of Benjamin Eakins (plaster, 1894), Hirshhorn Museum and Sculpture Garden. Won the Philadelphia Art Club's gold medal in 1894.
- Statuette of Susan MacDowell Eakins (plaster, 1894), Pennsylvania Academy of the Fine Arts, Philadelphia, PA.
- Head of Thomas Eakins (plaster, 1894), National Portrait Gallery, Washington, D.C.
  - A 1924 bronze cast is at the Philadelphia Museum of Art.
- Ten Biblical Prophets (terracotta, 1896–98), Witherspoon Building, Philadelphia, PA (removed 1961, three survive).
- Bust of James H. Windrim (bronze, 1901–02), Smith Memorial Arch, West Fairmount Park, Philadelphia, PA. Won a silver medal at the 1904 Louisiana Purchase Exposition.
- Commodore John Barry (bronze, 1906–08), Independence Hall, Philadelphia, PA.
- Statuette of Thomas Eakins Sitting (plaster, 1907), Pennsylvania Academy of the Fine Arts, Philadelphia, PA.
- Joseph Leidy (bronze, 1907), Academy of Natural Sciences, Philadelphia, PA.
- Father William Corby (bronze, 1909–10), Gettysburg Battlefield, Gettysburg, PA. The statue stands on the same rock on which Father Corby stood while granting absolution to Union troops before the second day of the battle.
  - A 1911 replica is at the University of Notre Dame.
- Goddess of Victory and Peace (bronze, 1909–10), Pennsylvania State Memorial, Gettysburg Battlefield, Gettysburg, PA. Murray also modeled the bas-reliefs above the monument's arches.
- Sorrow (bronze, 1912), Alfred O. Deshong Memorial, Chester Rural Cemetery, Chester, PA. A statuette of Sorrow (bronze, circa 1910) and Murray's Bust of Alfred O. Deshong (bronze, circa 1916) are in the Alfred O. Deshong Collection at Widener University.
- Bishop John W. Shanahan Memorial (bronze, 1916–18), Cathedral of Saint Patrick, Harrisburg, PA. Located at the rear of the nave, the memorial features a large bronze crucifix set in a niche of white marble.
- Admiral George W. Melville (bronze, 1923), Philadelphia Naval Yard, Philadelphia, PA. A 1904 statuette of this is at the American Philosophical Society.
- Senator Boies Penrose (bronze, 1930), Pennsylvania State Capitol, Harrisburg, PA.
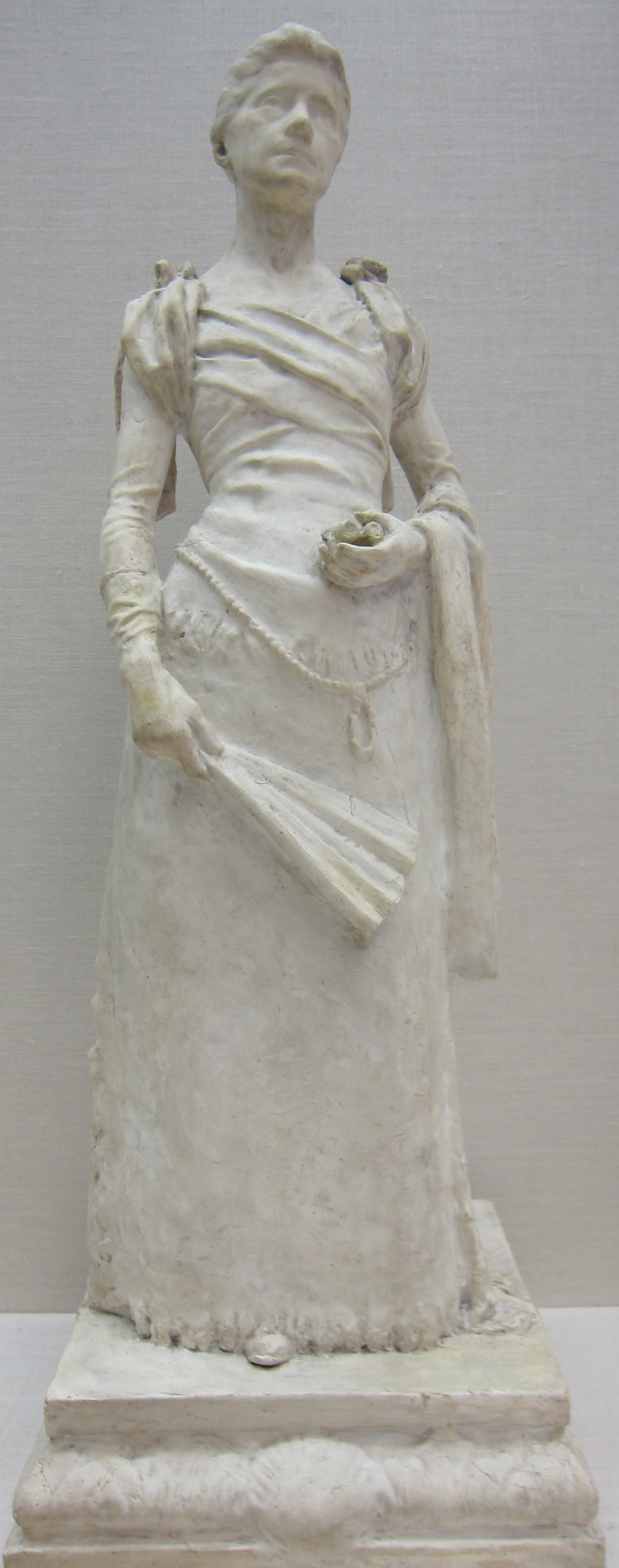
Statuette of Susan MacDowell Eakins (plaster, 1894), Pennsylvania Academy of the Fine Arts, Philadelphia, PA

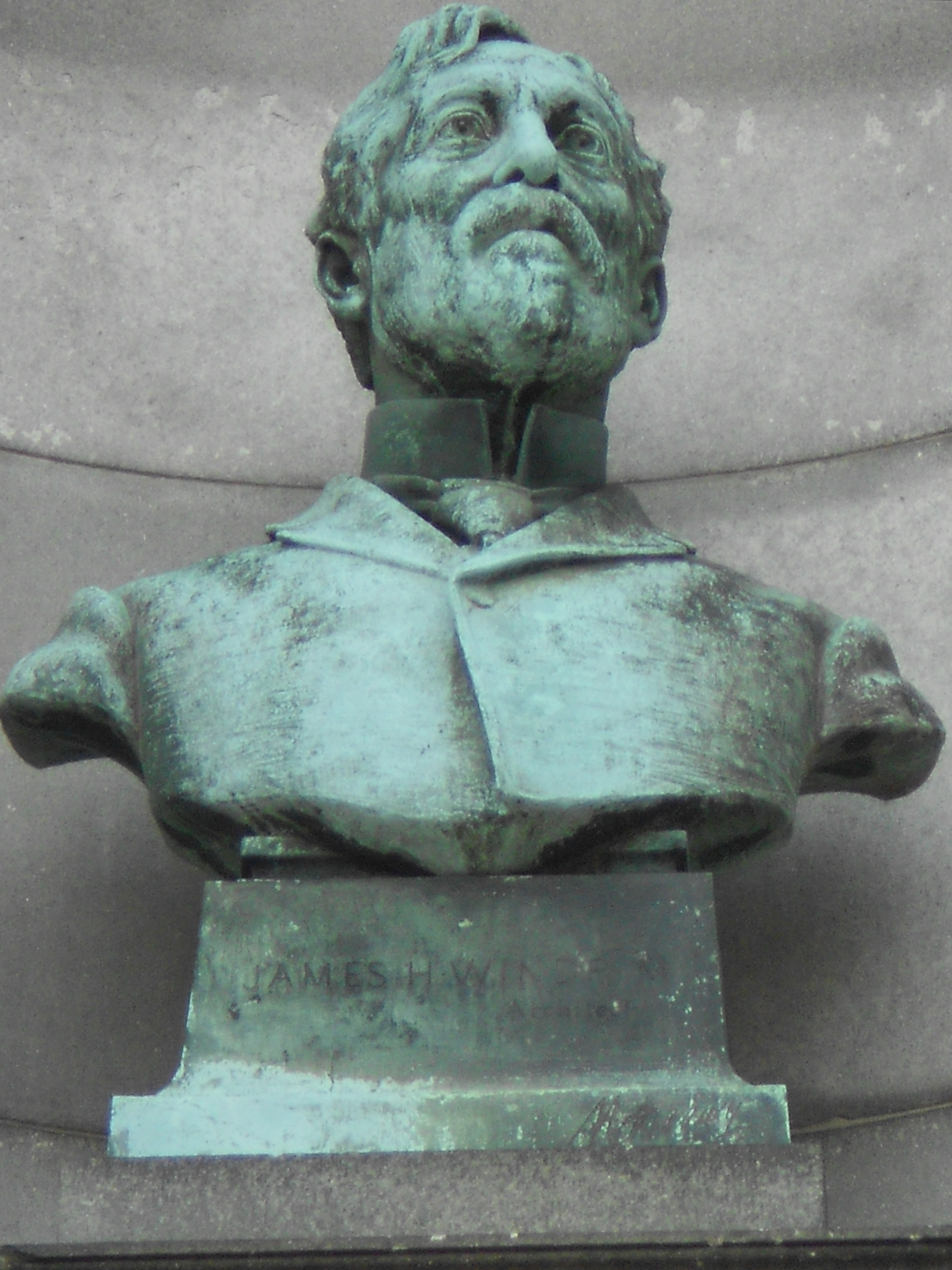
Bust of James H. Windrim (bronze, 1901–1902), Smith Memorial Arch, Philadelphia, PA

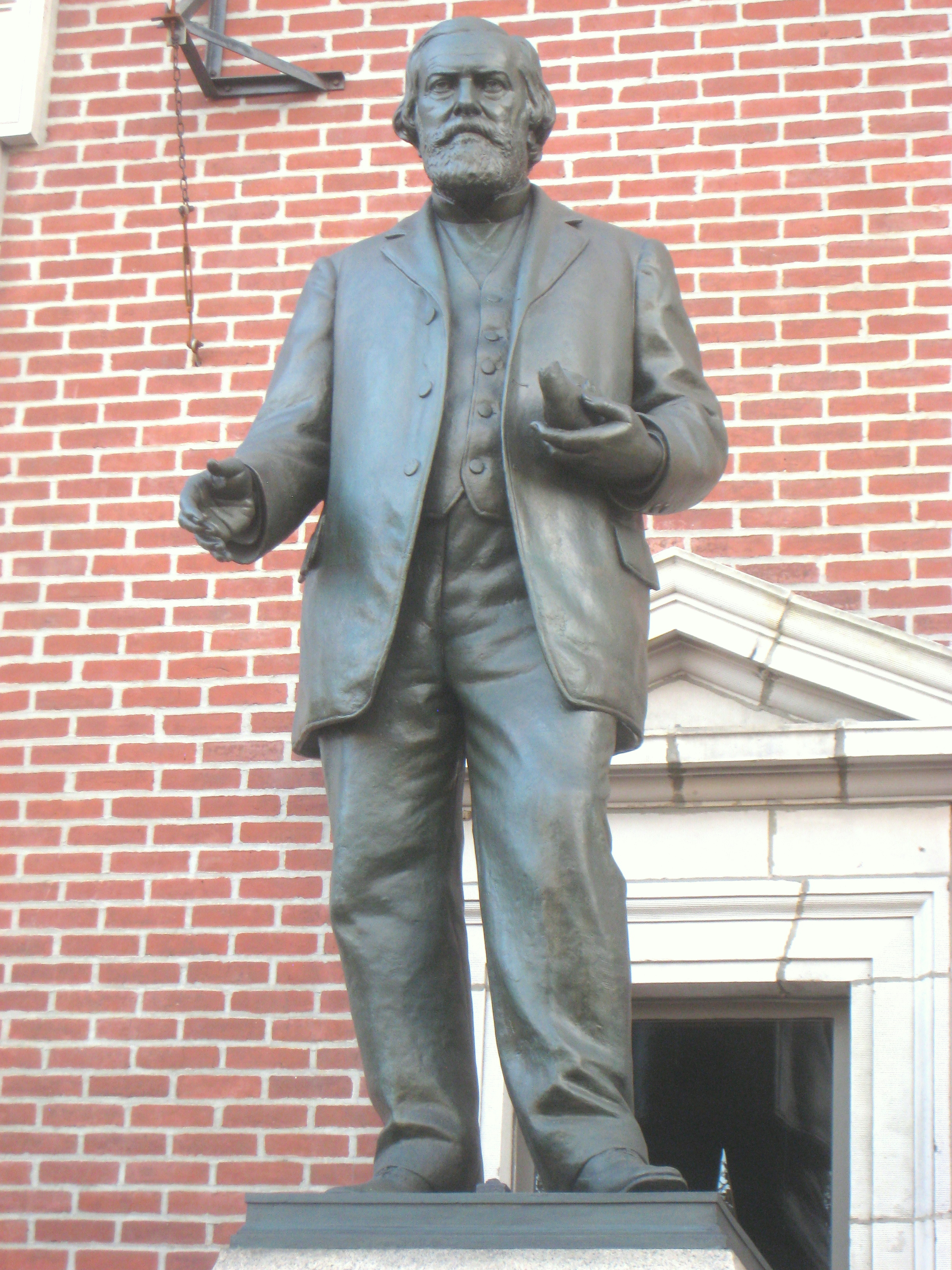
Joseph Leidy (bronze, 1907), Academy of Natural Sciences, Philadelphia, PA

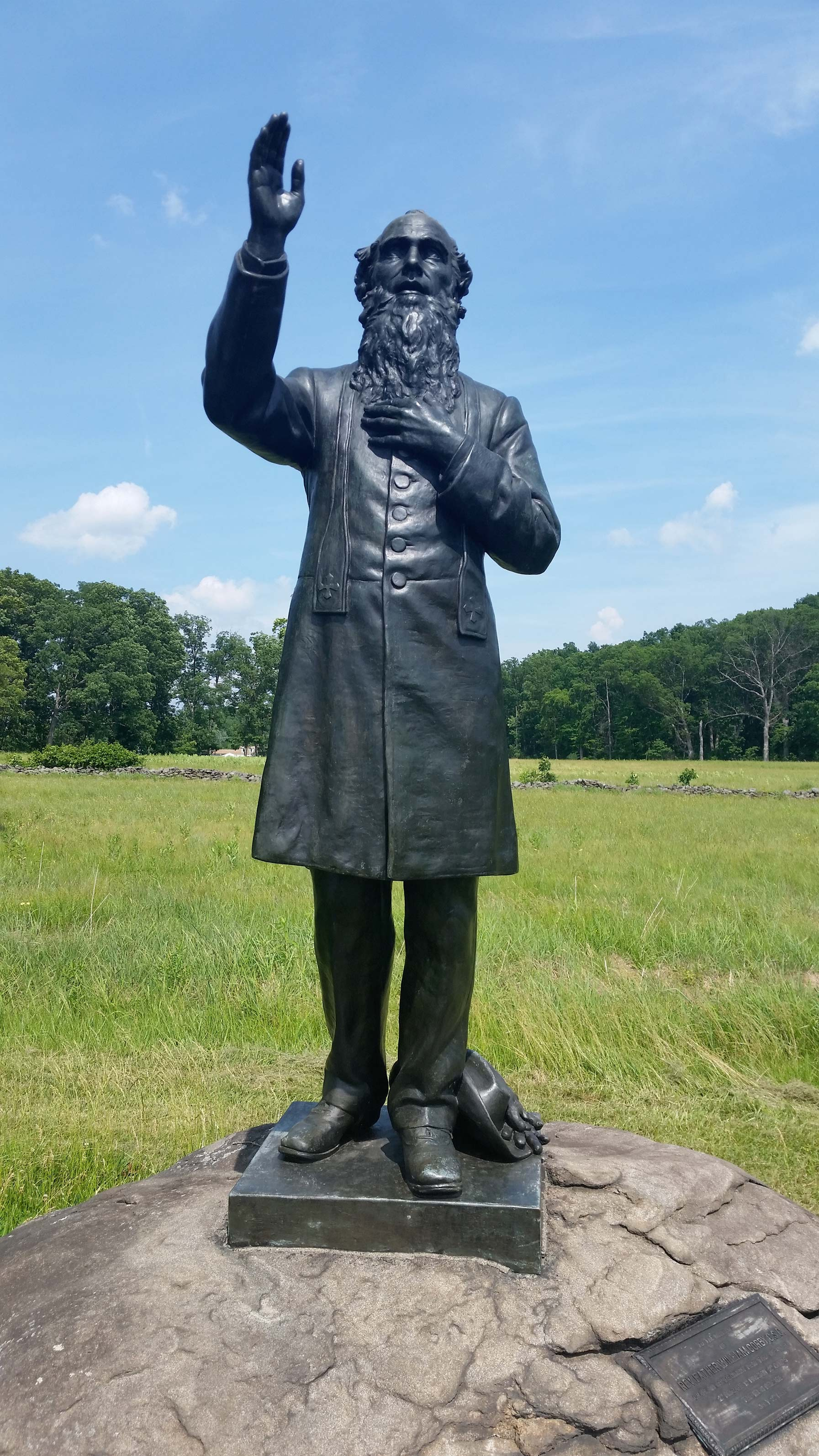
Father William Corby (bronze, 1909–1910), Gettysburg Battlefield, Gettysburg, PA

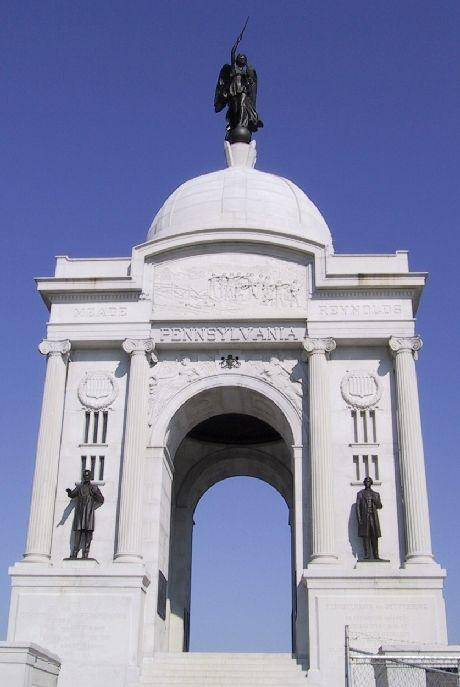
Goddess of Victory and Peace (bronze 1909–1910), atop the Pennsylvania State Memorial, Gettysburg Battlefield, Gettysburg, PA. Murray also modeled the bas-reliefs above the arches.

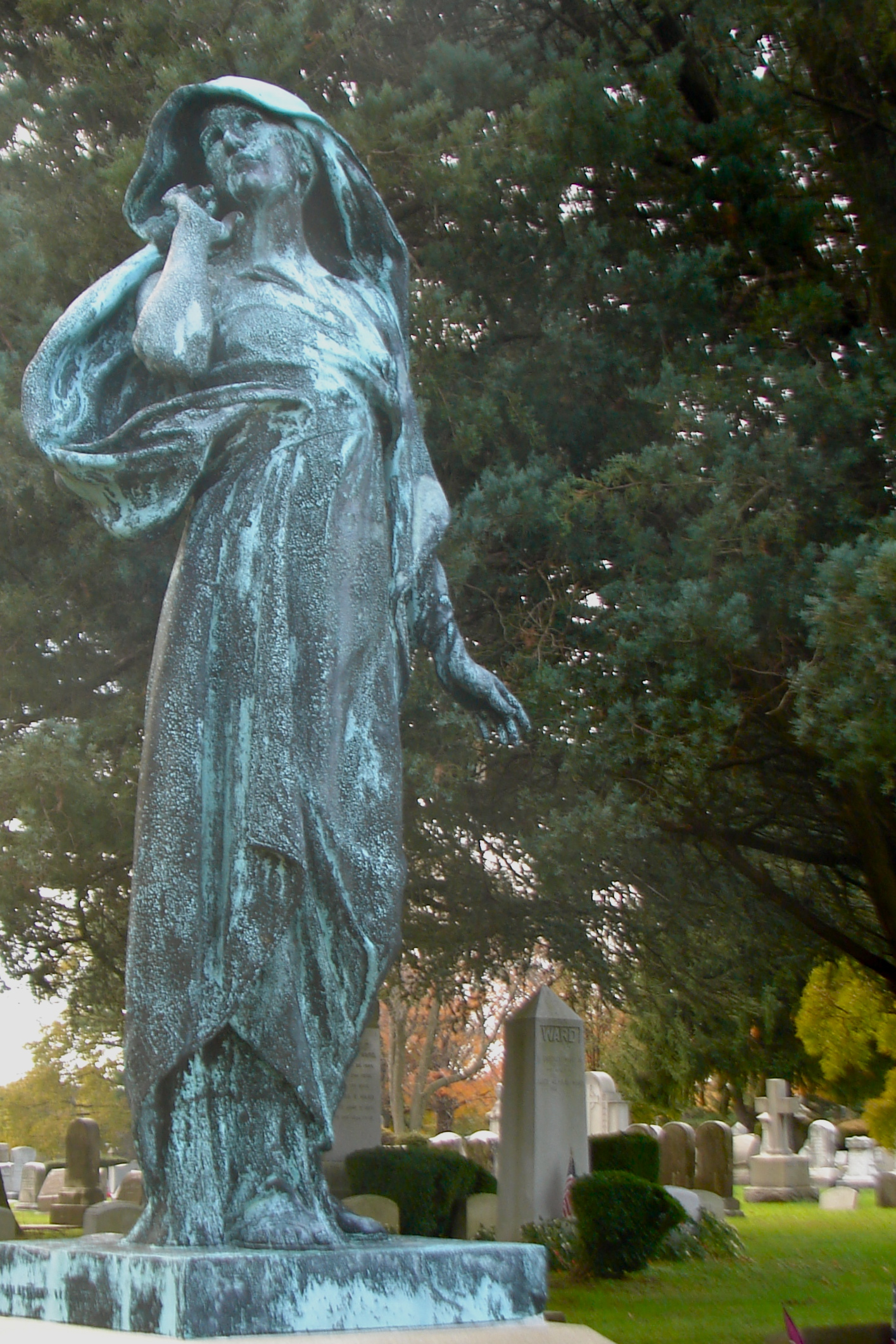
Sorrow (bronze, 1912), Alfred O. Deshong Memorial, Chester Rural Cemetery, Chester, PA

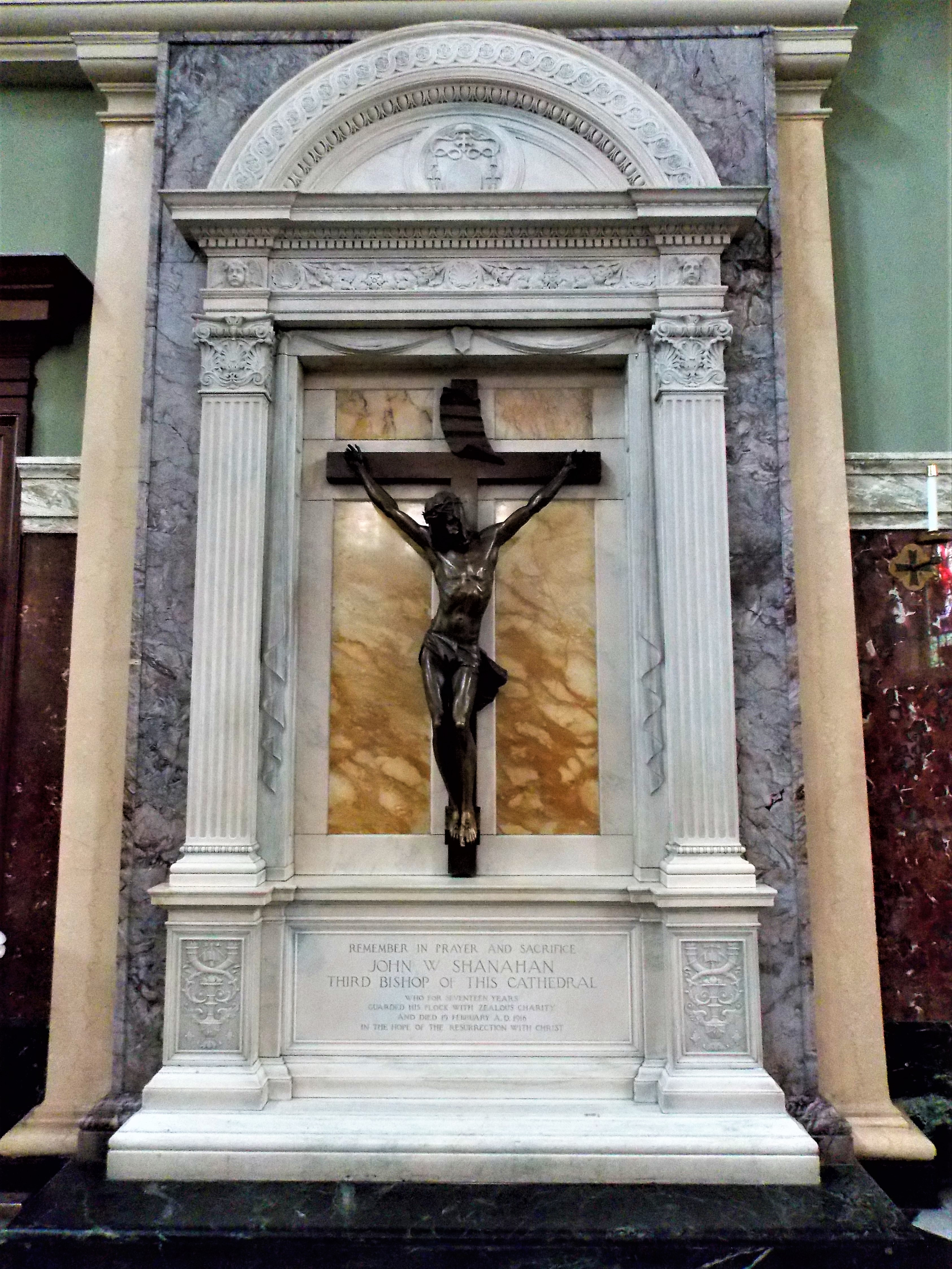
Bishop Shanahan Memorial (bronze, 1916–1918), St. Patrick's Cathedral, Harrisburg, PA

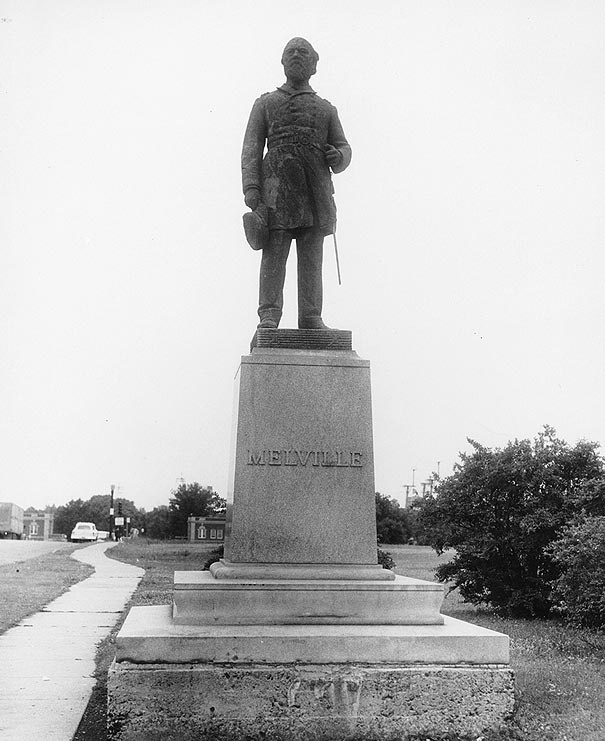
Admiral George W. Melville (bronze, 1923), Philadelphia Naval Yard, Philadelphia, PA

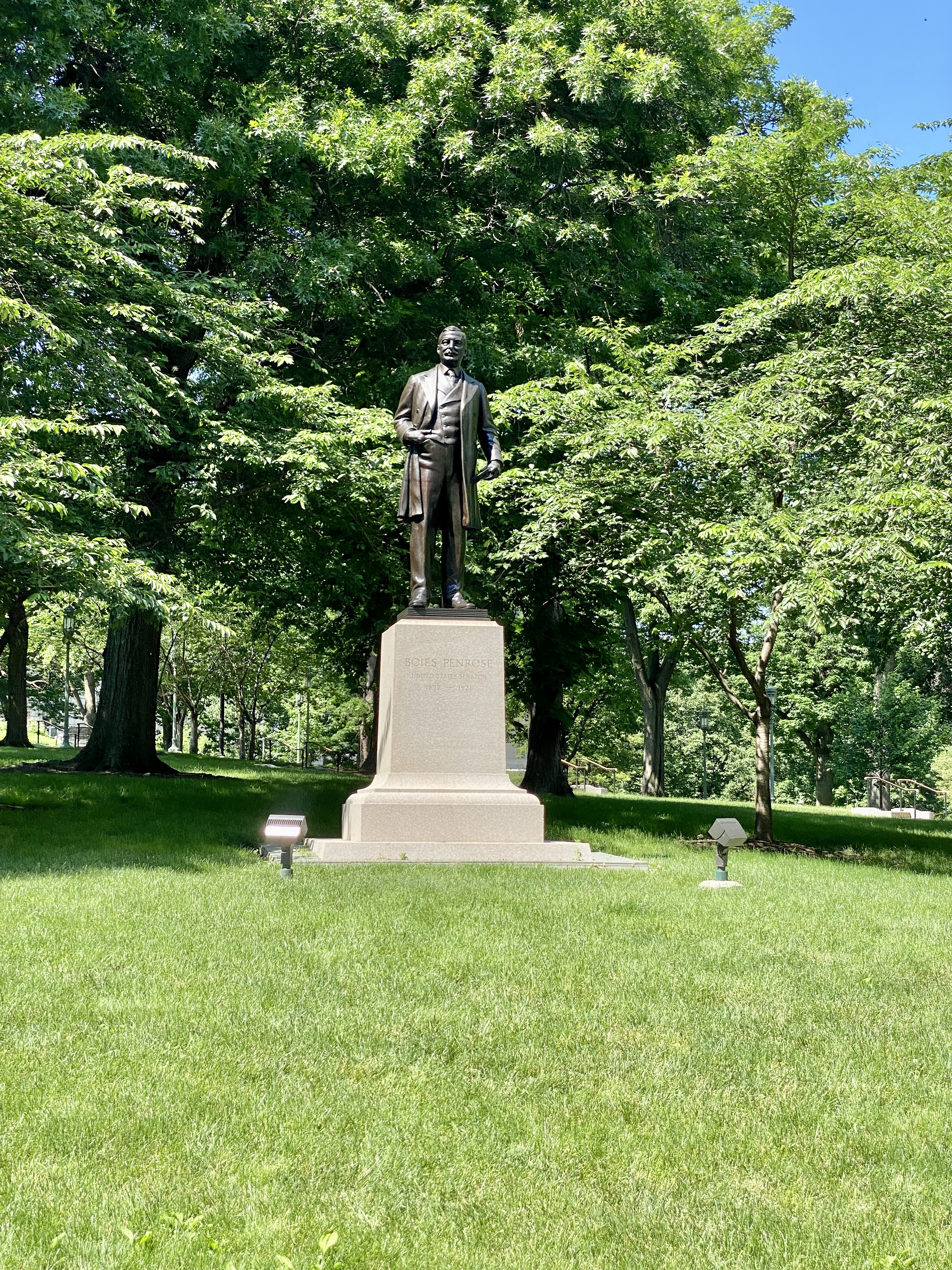
Boies Penrose Monument (1930), Pennsylvania State Capitol, Harrisburg, PA
