= Kevin J. Madigan =

American historian (born 1960)

- Born: March 28, 1960 (age 66)
- Occupations: Theologian; professor; author
- Title: Winn Professor of Ecclesiastical History
- Spouse: Stephanie Paulsell

Academic background
- Education: College of the Holy Cross (BA); University of Virginia (MA); University of Chicago (MDiv, PhD)
- Thesis: Peter Olivi's Lectura super Matthaeum in Medieval Exegetical Context (1992)
- Doctoral advisor: Bernard McGinn

Academic work
- Discipline: Theology
- Institutions: University of Chicago; Northwestern University; Harvard University

Kevin J. Madigan (born March 28, 1960) is an American historian and theologian. He is the Winn Professor of Ecclesiastical History at Harvard Divinity School. He was appointed to the position in 2009 by Harvard Divinity dean William Graham and Harvard president Drew Gilpin Faust.

Madigan has served on Harvard University's Committee on the Study of Religion, the Medieval Studies Committee, and the Center for Jewish Studies.

== Education ==
Madigan graduated from the College of the Holy Cross with a Bachelor of Arts, magna cum laude, in English literature in 1982. He then earned a Master of Arts in English literature from the University of Virginia in 1984. He then earned his Master of Divinity in 1985 and his Ph.D. with distinction in the history of Christianity in 1992 from the University of Chicago. His doctoral dissertation, completed under Bernard McGinn, was titled, "Peter Olivi's Lectura super Matthaeum in Medieval Exegetical Context".

In 1991, Madigan was a Fulbright Scholar in Italy. From 1992 to 1994, he was a post-doctoral fellow at Chicago's Institute for the Advanced Study of Religion.

== Areas of specialization and early career ==
Madigan trained in medieval Christianity at the University of Chicago under Bernard McGinn. While at Chicago, Madigan took courses with Professor Jon D. Levenson, with whom, after Madigan joined the Harvard faculty, he would collaborate in publication and in the editing of the journal Harvard Theological Review. After taking his doctorate, Madigan also trained at the Summer Institute on the Holocaust and Jewish Civilization, then held annually under the direction of Peter Hayes and sponsored by Chicago's Holocaust Educational Foundation. The following summer, he studied under the then-dean of American Holocaust scholars, the late Raul Hilberg at the United States Holocaust Memorial Museum in Washington. In 1994, Madigan took his first "ladder" job as Assistant Professor of Church History at Catholic Theological Union (CTU) in Chicago; he would be tenured there in the spring of 1999. While on the faculty of CTU, Madigan came under the influence of distinguished scholars, such as Robert Schreiter, Zachary Hayes, Donald Senior, John Pawlikowski, and Carolyn Osiek. He would collaborate in publications with several of these colleagues even after leaving Chicago for Cambridge in the summer of 1999.

== Publications ==
With Professor Senior, he collaborated on the introductory material to Oxford University Press' Catholic Study Bible, writing an essay on the reception and interpretation of the Bible in the Catholic Church, c. 200–2000 CE, and with Professor Osiek he would, after leaving CTU, soon collaborate on a book on women and ordained office in Early Christianity. While Osiek handled the Greek texts, Madigan translated and commented on all extant Latin texts, including inscriptions, c. 100–66. The same year Ordained Women appeared, Antisemitism: An Encyclopedia of Prejudice and Persecution, edited by Richard Levy, and of which Madigan was associate editor, was published. Finally, with Pawlikowski, he published his first article on the Holocaust, based on the eleven volumes of the Actes and Documents du Saint Siège relatifs à la Seconde Guerre Mondiale ed P. Blet et al. A later version of this article, revised for popular consumption, would be published in 2001, entitled "What the Vatican Knew about the Holocaust, and When." The article inaugurated a long and fruitful relationship between Madigan and Commentary, for which he would publish articles in 2010 on Popes Pius XI and XII, in 2010 on the use made by "Nazis on the Run" of the Vatican's Pontifical Aid Commission", and in 2014 on the Vatican's relationship with the government of Benito Mussolini. This, in fact, was a review-essay of David Kertzer's Pulitzer Prize-winning "double-biography of Mussolini and Pope Pius XI. Madigan would later publish a review defending the distinguished Brown University historian, author of the brilliant and critically acclaimed The Kidnapping of Edgardo Mortara, (about to be made into a movie by Steven Spielberg) in the New York Review of Books after a book-length critique of Kertzer's study The Popes against the Jews: The Vatican's Role in the Rise of Modern Antisemitism, a volume that had been translated into nine languages, had been published.

Madigan's Chicago dissertation, on the influence of Joachim of Fiore and of controversies surrounding the "Spiritual Franciscans" on commentaries on the Gospel of Matthew in the high Middle Ages, especially that written by Peter Olivi (1248–98), was published in revised form in 2003. Madigan talks about his first book in a published interview with an HDS journalist. His first articles were on biblical interpretation, scholastic thought and Christology in the High Middle Ages. Later gathered together and augmented by several other essays, they would form the core of a book, entitled "The Passions of Christ in the High Middle Ages: An Essay on Christological Development (Oxford University Press, 2007) on the intertwined issues of biblical exegesis, scholastic thought, and the issue of dogmatic "continuity" in Christian tradition.

In the years 2009–2011, Madigan began to collaborate in several respects with his former teacher, close friend and HDS colleague, Jon D. Levenson, a fruitful collaboration that continues to this day. After publishing his award-winning book Resurrection and the Restoration of Israel, Levenson, at the request of his editor at Yale University Press, co-authored with Madigan a book on the Jewish roots and Christian appropriation of the idea of resurrection in Second Temple Judaism. In 2010, the two would take over as co-editors of Harvard Theological Review, as their dear friend and colleague, François Bovon, grew more and more ill before his death in 2013.

In 2015, Madigan published Medieval Christianity: A New History, also published by Yale University Press. It has received generally positive reviews. Francis Oakley wrote in Commonweal that "Madigan's book can be said to convey a picture of medieval Christianity that is no less lively for being well-informed and carefully balanced. It can be recommended without reservation to any interested reader." Rachel Fulton Brown wrote that it is "a masterful yet accessible introduction to the principal institutional, intellectual, and social developments of medieval Christianity, including the papacy and religious orders, particularly valuable for its attention to the place of Jews, Muslims, heretics, and women in these developments, as well as the problem of educating the laity." Madigan finished the book after serving as Associate Dean for Academic Affairs and Faculty for two years at HDS, working with and for his colleague in history, Dean David Hempton. Madigan is now working on a book, based on the rich resources of the Vatican, Jesuit, and Central State Archives in Rome, on the relationship between Protestants and Catholics during the Fascist period in Italy. Entitled The Pope against the Protestants: Evangelical Christians and the Vatican in the Fascist Period in Italy, the book will be published by Yale University Press in 2021.

== Personal life ==
Madigan has been married for over thirty years to Stephanie Paulsell, Susan Shallcross Swartz Professor of the Practice of Christian Studies at HDS. They have one child, Amanda P. Madigan, a student at Harvard Law School. In the summer of 2020, Madigan and Paulsell were appointed Faculty Deans of Eliot House, one of twelve undergraduate residences of Harvard College. They stepped down as Faculty Deans at the end of the 2023-24 academic year.
