= Edward Foley =

Edward Foley may refer to:

- Edward Foley (cricketer) (1851–1923), English cricketer
- Edward Foley (mass murderer) (1811–1838), convicted perpetrator of the Myall Creek massacre
- Edward Foley (priest), American Catholic priest and writer
- Edward Foley (1676–1747), twice MP for Droitwich
- Edward Foley (1747–1803) MP, 2nd son of Thomas Foley, 1st Baron Foley
- Edward Thomas Foley (1791–1846), his eldest son
- Edward B. Foley, American lawyer, law professor and election law scholar
- Edward P. Foley (1891–1980), Speaker of the Prince Edward Island legislature in 1959
- Edmond Foley (1897–1921), sometimes known as Edward, member of the Irish Republican Army
- A fictional CIA director in the Tom Clancy novels
