= John Tilson =

John Tilson may refer to:

- John Q. Tilson, American politician
- John Tilson (cricketer) (1845–1895), cricketer
