= George Huntston Williams =

American professor and historian of Christianity (1914–2000)

- Born: April 7, 1914; Huntsburg, Ohio, US
- Died: October 6, 2000 (aged 86)
- Spouse: Marjorie Derr (m. 1941)

Academic background
- Education: St. Lawrence University; Meadville Theological School; Union Theological Seminary
- Influences: James Luther Adams

Academic work
- Discipline: History
- Sub-discipline: History of Christianity
- Institutions: Harvard University
- Main interests: Socinianism; Unitarianism
- Notable works: The Radical Reformation (1962)

George Huntston Williams (April 7, 1914, in Huntsburg – October 6, 2000) was an American academic, historian of Christianity, and professor of nontrinitarian Christian theology. His works focused on the historical research of nontrinitarian Christian movements that emerged during the Protestant Reformation, primarily Socinianism and Unitarianism.

== Biography ==
George Pease Williams was born in 1914. His father David Rhys Williams was a Unitarian minister who signed the Humanist Manifesto, while his grandparents were Congregationalists.

Williams changed his middle name as a young man and chose the name of his village, Huntsburg, Ohio. He went to study at St. Lawrence University (graduated 1936) and Meadville Theological School (graduated 1939). After his academic studies in history of Christianity at the European universities of Paris and Strasbourg, he returned to the United States and became assistant minister of a Unitarian church in Rockford, Illinois, where he married his wife Marjorie Derr in 1941.

From 1941 onwards, he taught Church history at the Unitarian-affiliated Starr King School for the Ministry in Berkeley, California, and at the nearby Pacific School of Religion, while studying for his Th.D. completed at Union Theological Seminary, New York (1946). From 1947 he taught at Harvard Divinity School, being appointed Winn Professor of Ecclesiastical History from 1956 to 1963.

In 1962 he was one of several official Protestant observers who attended the sessions of the Second Vatican Council, where he met the future Pope John Paul II.

He was elected to the American Academy of Arts and Sciences in 1953.

In 1981 he was appointed to the Hollis Chair of Divinity. He was among the original Editorial Advisors of the scholarly journal Dionysius. As an anti-abortion activist, he became the first chairman of the board of Americans United for Life.

A Festschrift was published in his honor in 1999 titled The Contentious Triangle: Church, State, and University. Contributors included Jaroslav Pelikan, Timothy George and Harold O. J. Brown, among others.

== Works ==
- The Norman Anonymous of 1100 A.D.: Toward the Identification and Evaluation of the So-Called Anonymous of York, 1951
- Spiritual and Anabaptist Writers: Documents Illustrative of the Radical Reformation, 1957
- The Radical Reformation, 1962 ISBN 0-940474-15-8.
- The Polish Brethren: Documentation of the History and Thought of Unitarianism in the Polish-Lithuanian Commonwealth and in the Diaspora 1601-1685, Scholars Press, 1980, ISBN 0-89130-343-X.
- The Mind of John Paul II: Origins of His Thought and Action, Seabury, 1981, ISBN 0816404631.
- Unterschiede zwischen dem polnischen und dem siebenbürgisch-ungarischen Unitarismus und ihre Ursachen, in: Wolfgang Deppert/Werner Erdt/Aart de Groot (Hrsg.): Der Einfluß der Unitarier auf die europäisch-amerikanische Geistesgeschichte, Peter Lang Verlag, Frankfurt am Main/Bern/New York/Paris 1990, ISSN 0930-4118, ISBN 3-631-41859-0, S. 33–57.
- Article The Attitude of Liberals in New England toward Non-Christian Religions, 1784-1885, Crane Review 9.

== Family ==
Williams was married to Marjorie Derr for 59 years and they had four children.

Academic offices
Preceded by Kirsopp Lake	Winn Professor of Ecclesiastical History; 1956–1963	Succeeded by Heiko Oberman
Preceded by Amos Wilder	Hollis Chair of Divinity; 1963–1980	Succeeded by Harvey Cox
