= Kenneth Hagen =

Kenneth Hagen may refer to:

- Kenneth G. Hagen (1936-2014), American theologian and scholar of the Protestant Reformation
- Kenneth Sverre Hagen (1919–1997), American entomologist

== See also ==
- Kenneth Hagan, American naval historian
- Kenneth E. Hagin (1917–2003), American Charismatic preacher
