= Catholic Theological Union =

Catholic graduate school in Illinois, US

Coordinates: 41°47′52″N 87°35′09″W

- Motto: Preparing effective leaders for the Church, ready to witness to Christ's good news of justice, love, and peace.
- Type: Private graduate school of theology
- Established: 1968
- Accreditation: ATS
- Religious affiliation: Roman Catholic
- Academic affiliations: Association of Chicago Theological Schools (ACTS), DePaul University, Lay Centre at Foyer Unitas, Lutheran School of Theology at Chicago, McCormick Theological Seminary, University of Chicago Divinity School
- Endowment: $41.7 million (FY23)
- President: Enzo Del Brocco
- Dean: Ferdinand Okorie
- Faculty: 16 full-time, 20 full-time equivalent
- Administrative staff: 42
- Postgraduates: 193, 127 full-time equivalent
- Location: Chicago, Illinois, U.S.
- Campus: Urban
- Website: ctu.edu

Catholic Theological Union (CTU) is a private Catholic graduate school of theology in Chicago, Illinois, United States. It was formed in Hyde Park as a union of schools from three Catholic religious institutes and has since been sponsored by 24 institutes and Catholic faith communities. It is one of the largest Catholic graduate schools of theology in the English-speaking world, training men and women for both lay and ordained ministry within the Catholic Church. It gained renewed attention in 2025 with reporting that the newly-elected Pope Leo XIV was an alumnus, who had earned a Master of Divinity degree in 1982.

== History ==
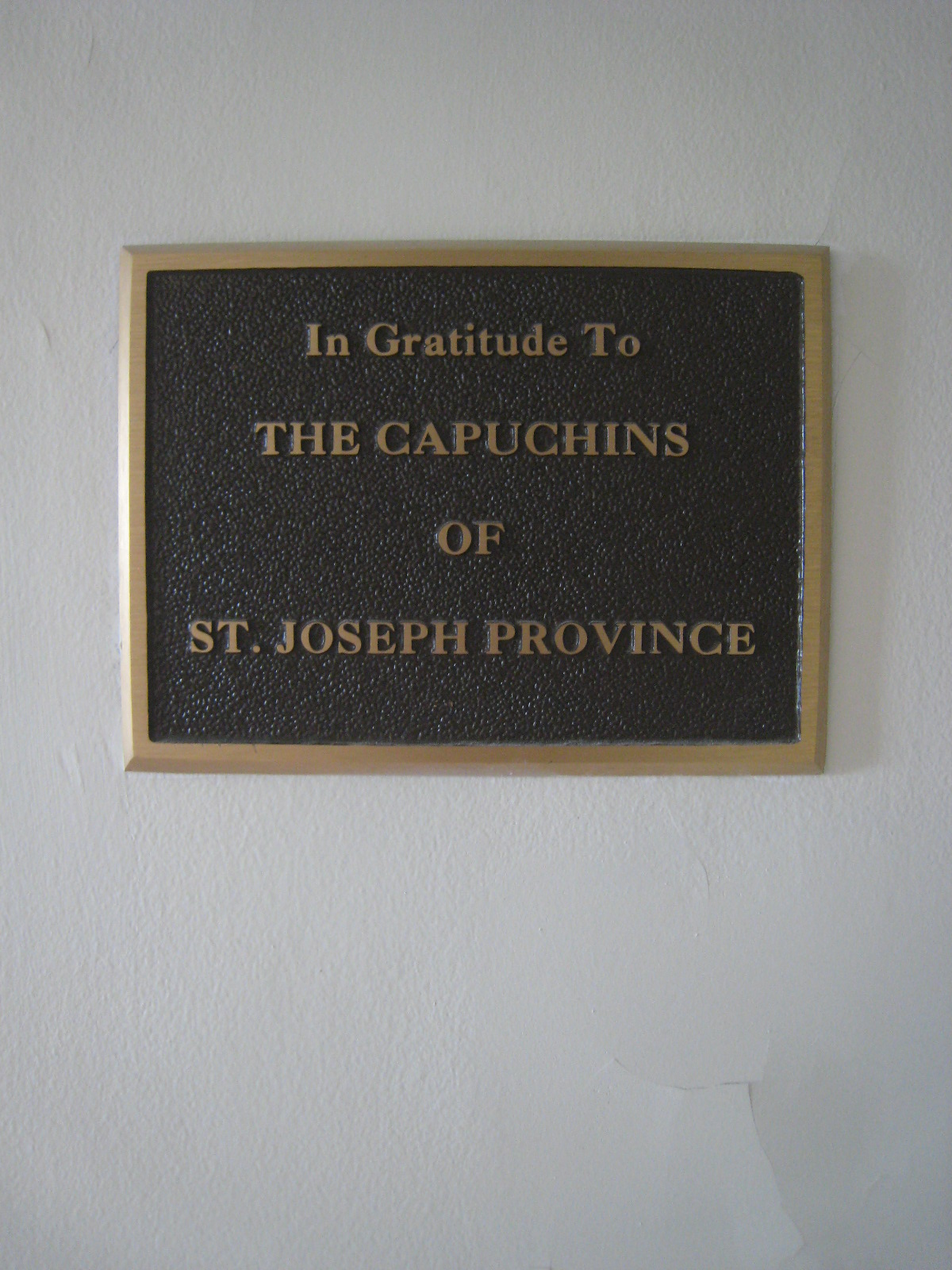
A plaque within one of the rooms at the Union

The Union was founded in 1968, when three religious institutes—the Franciscans, Passionists, and Servites—united their separate theology programs to form one school. As such, it was influenced a bit by the feeling of 1960s radicalism, but more directly was inspired by the changes of the Second Vatican Council. The Union has since gained the sponsorship of twenty-three religious communities.

During the 1970s and 1980s, there was a movement among some Union students and faculty in support of the ordination of women within the Catholic Church; this included organizing a meeting on the CTU campus in 1976 of the Women’s Ordination Conference and staging a protest at a 1981 ordination event at the nearby St. Thomas the Apostle Catholic Church, with the latter being one of the events that led the Vatican to order an investigation of American Catholic seminaries.

In 1986, the Metropolitan Andrey Sheptytsky Institute of Eastern Christian Studies was founded at CTU by Ukrainian Greek Catholic priest and faculty member Andriy Chirovsky. Named after Andrey Sheptytsky, the institute was established to advance the academic study of Eastern Christianity, particularly the theological, liturgical, and spiritual traditions of the Kyivan Church. The institute remained at CTU until 1990, when it relocated to Ottawa, Canada. It is now affiliated with the University of St. Michael's College at the University of Toronto.

The school granted its first Master of Divinity degree to a woman in 1981.

The Catholic Theological Union building is at 5416 South Cornell Avenue in the Hyde Park neighborhood of Chicago. In 2023, the campus of the Lutheran School of Theology at Chicago relocated to the 4th floor of the James and Catherine Denny Center at the Catholic Theological Union. Construction of new facilities on the floor of the Catholic Theological Union had begun earlier: the space includes four classrooms; two zoom rooms, thirty office spaces; a prayer and meditation room, a café, a chapel, and a grand hallway meeting space. With it came the McCormick Theological Seminary, with which it had already been sharing facilities.

== Academics ==
CTU is staffed by religious and lay men and women. International students constitute nearly one-third of the student body.

The main library of CTU is the Paul Bechtold Library, named after CTU's founding president. Distinctive collections in the library include Catholic religious communities, dialogue across ecumenical and inter-religious lines, and pastoral theology.

=== Publications ===
- New Theology Review (NTR)
- Theophilus: The Student Journal of Catholic Theological Union

== Presidents ==
- Paul Bechtold, Founding President, 1968–1978
- Alcuin Coyle, 1978–1981
- John Linnan, 1981–1987
- Donald Senior, 1987–1995
- Norman Bevan, 1995–1997
- Donald Senior, 1997–2013
- Mark Francis, 2013–2020
- Barbara Reid, 2021–2025
- Enzo Del Brocco, 2025–present

== Notable theologians and faculty ==
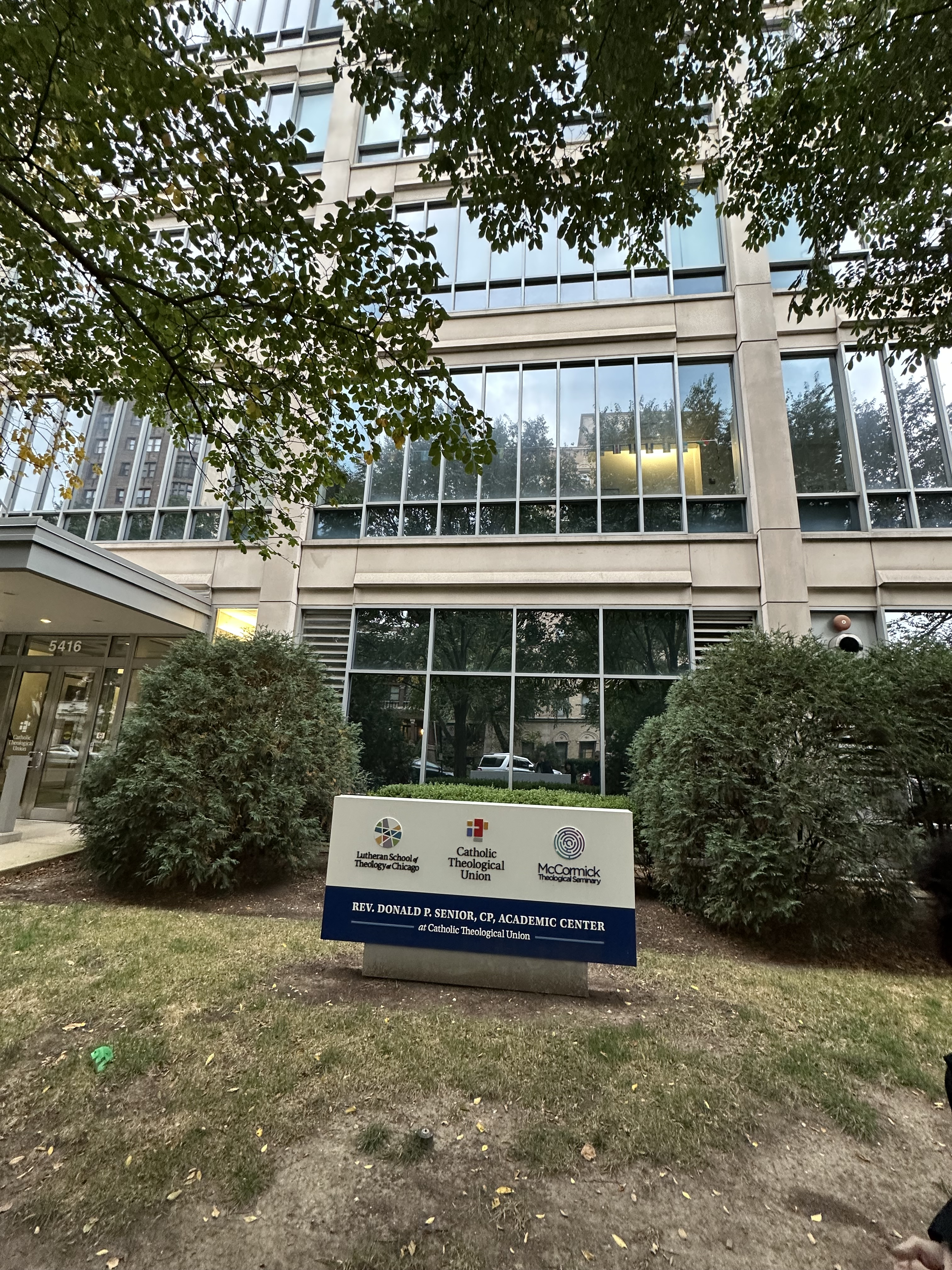
Catholic Theological Union building in Hyde Park, with sign indicating that Lutheran School of Theology at Chicago and McCormick Theological Seminary share space with it.

- Claude Marie Barbour, scholar of world mission
- Stephen B. Bevans, scholar of mission and culture
- John Dominic Crossan, scholar of the New Testament
- Edward Foley, scholar of spirituality, liturgy, and music
- Peter Galadza – Ukrainian Greek Catholic priest and liturgical theologian; former dean of the Lviv Theological Academy (now Ukrainian Catholic University).
- John Jefferson Gros, scholar of Christian ecumenical studies (adjunct faculty member)
- Leslie J. Hoppe, scholar of the Old Testament
- Daniel P. Horan, scholar of systematic theology and spirituality
- Kevin J. Madigan, scholar of church history
- Steven P. Millies, professor of public theology
- John T. Pawlikowski, scholar of social ethics
- Robert J. Schreiter, scholar of theology and culture
- Wayne Robert Teasdale, scholar and practitioner of interreligious dialogue (adjunct faculty member)
- Zachary Hayes, professor of systematic theology

== Notable alumni ==
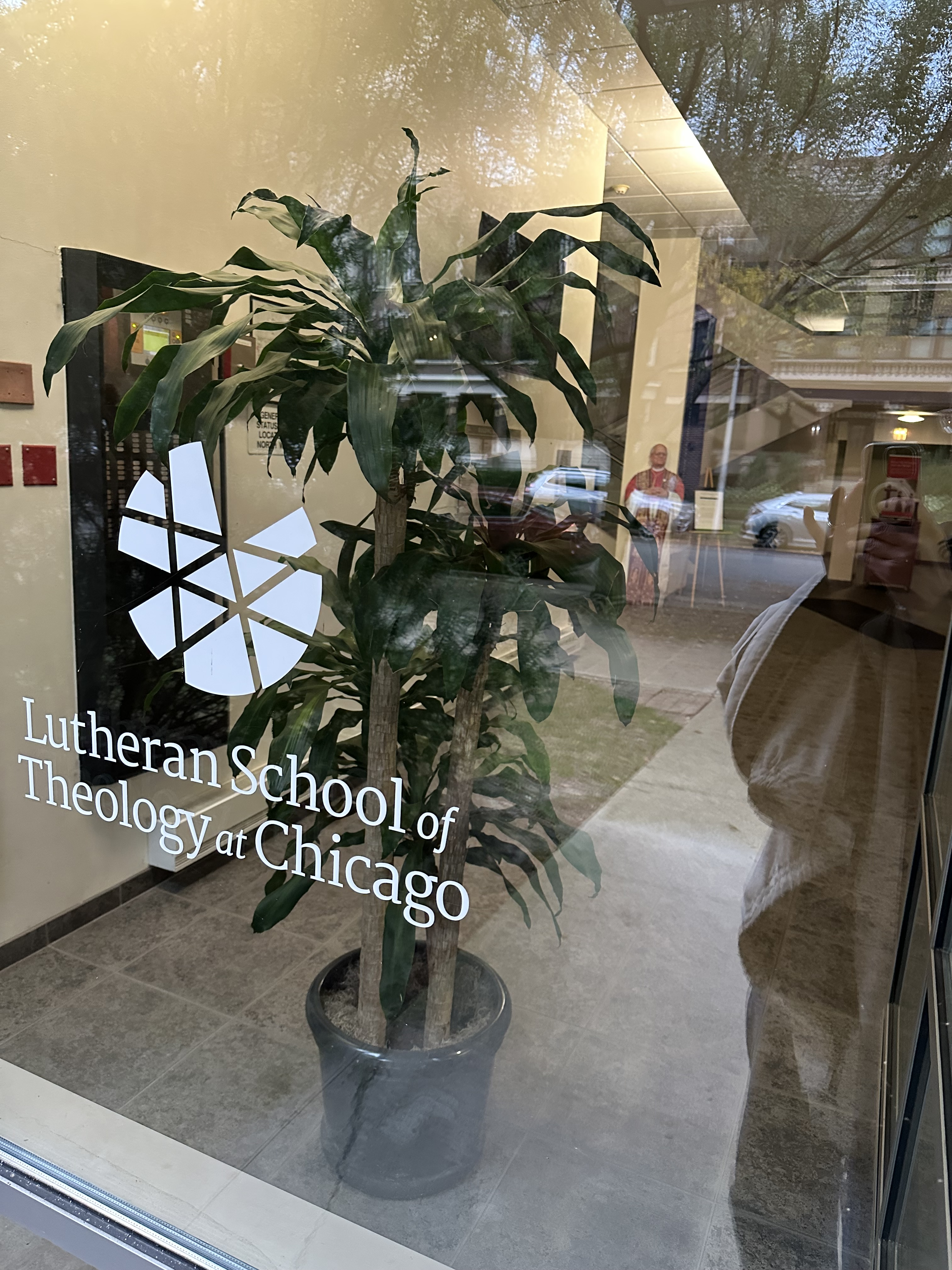
In 2025, a cardboard cutout of alumnus Pope Leo XIV can be seen in the lobby of the Catholic Theological Union

- Pope Leo XIV (MDiv 1982 as Robert Francis Prevost) – 267th pope.
- Saleha Jabeen (MA 2014, MDiv 2020) – first female Muslim chaplain in the United States Department of Defense.
