= Winn Professor of Ecclesiastical History =

Endowed chair at Harvard Divinity School

The Winn Professorship of Ecclesiastical History is an endowed chair at Harvard Divinity School. It was established in 1877 by a bequest from Jonathan Bowers Winn (1811-1873), a business man in Woburn, Massachusetts.

== History ==
Jonathan Bowers Winn, who died in 1873, had left $100,000 in a trust for his son, which would transfer to the "Unitarian Denomination" should his son die "without issue," which in fact happened two years later. As a result, the sum was to be disposed of under the direction of Edward Everett Hale (1822-1909), a Unitarian minister, and Andrew P. Peabody (1811-1893), Plummer Professor of Christian Morals at Harvard Divinity School. The two concluded that a professorship in Ecclesiastical History at the Unitarian Harvard Divinity School would be a worthy cause, and petitioned the Supreme Judicial Court for permission to use a portion of the funds to that end. The court granted the petition in 1877, concluding that since "Harvard College is the seminary of higher education to which young men from Unitarian families chiefly resort; and whereas the Divinity School of Harvard College was founded by Unitarians, is supported mainly by funds contributed by Unitarians ... and is the principal seminary in the country for the education of Unitarian ministers; and whereas Ecclesiastical History is an essential department of study for Unitarians, as well as other ministers, and is of the highest value in the religious education of Unitarians, as of all other youth," an endowed chair would be a suitable use for a portion of the funds. It directed the two "to pay over the sum of forty-three thousand five hundred dollars to the President and Fellows of Harvard College to be by them held in trust for the establishment of a professorship to be called the Winn Professorship of Ecclesiastical History."

The duties of the holder of the chair were detailed as follows: "The Professor, when appointed, shall first of all give such instruction in Ecclesiastical History to students in the Divinity School, and to special students in Theology in the University, as the Theological Faculty may direct and require. To such courses of instruction any members of the University may be admitted. He shall also give instruction, by lectures or otherwise, on such subjects as the religious history of the world; the relations of secular and church history; the influence of Christianity on the Roman Law, on preexisting institutions and customs, and on the earlier philosophies; the influence of antecedent institutions, religions, and philosophies, on Christianity; and the origin, history, and scope of the canon law; —such instruction to be open to all members of every department of the University."

The President of Harvard at the time Charles William Eliot (1834-1926) began to make inquiries of potential candidates for the chair. Both William Robertson Smith (1846-1894), a noted biblical scholar at the University of Aberdeen, and the great church historian Adolf von Harnack (1851-1930), then at the University of Giessen, turned down the offer. Eventually Ephraim Emerton (1851-1935), who had done his dissertation at Leipzig University, was appointed as the first holder of the chair in 1882.

== Chairholders ==
- Ephraim Emerton, (1882–1918)
- Kirsopp Lake, (1919–1932)
- George Huntston Williams, (1956–1963)
- Heiko Oberman, (1964–1966)
- Helmut Koester, (1968–1998)
- Karen Leigh King, (2003–2009)
- Kevin J. Madigan, (2009–present)
