= Jonathan Bowers Winn =

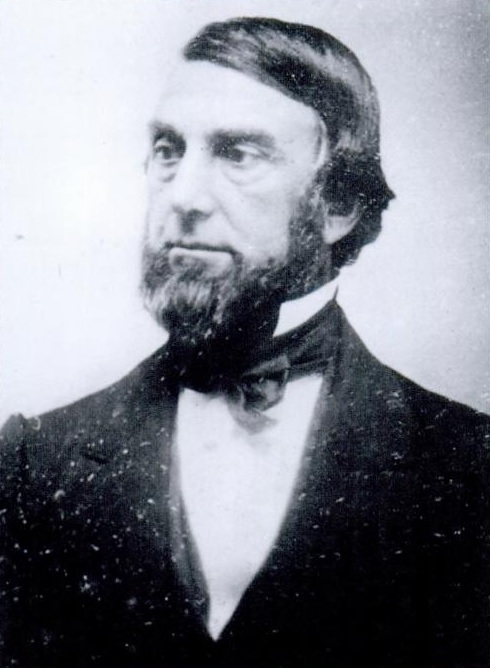
- Winn ca. 1860
- Born: 24 August 1811; Burlington, Massachusetts
- Died: 12 December 1873 (aged 62); Woburn, Massachusetts
- Spouse: Nancy Cummings (1814-1863)
- Children: Marcia Ann Winn (1836-1862), Charles Bowers Winn (1838-1875)
- Parent(s): Col. William Winn (1784-1856), Abigail Walker (1785-1826)

Jonathan Bowers Winn (24 August 1811 – 12 December 1873) was a school teacher, currier, business owner, banker, and benefactor. Both the Winn Professorship of Ecclesiastical History at Harvard Divinity School and the Woburn Public Library were bequests from his estate.

== Biography ==
Jonathan Bowers Winn was born at Burlington, Massachusetts on 24 August 1811, the son of Col. William Winn (14 Feb 1784 – 12 Apr 1856) and Abigail Walker (2 Sep 1785 – 11 May 1826). He was a descendant of one of the first settlers of Woburn, Massachusetts, and among the seventh generation of the family in the country.

As a young man he was a school teacher in Wilmington and North Woburn. Following his teaching career, he got involved in the leather making industry, first as a Currier, then becoming a partner in the rapidly expanding firm of John Cummings & Co. After learning the business, he started on his own in 1837, and then in 1841 established the leather manufacturing firm of J. B. Winn & Co. The factory was located on the north side of Salem Street, known today as Winn Park. Business was booming and Woburn soon became the leading town in leather production in Middlesex County and Winn amassed a small fortune. During 1843-44 Winn commanded the local militia company known as the Woburn Mechanic Phalanx. On 19 May 1844 the company "with 61 guns" attended the bicentennial of the founding of the town of Reading. During this period he also filled a number of minor offices in the town and other institutions.

In 1853 he was elected and served as a delegate to the State Constitutional Convention. The following year he was at a town meeting in November and proposed the creation of a free public library, adding that if the town would appropriate matching funds he would donate the $300 he had received for serving as convention delegate. The proposal met with a favorable reception and the offer was formally accepted March 1855. Finally, on 20 August 1856 the Woburn Public Library, also known as the Winn Memorial Library, opened for the first time (though not in the present building).

During the Civil War he was the most active citizen in raising money to properly furnish soldiers with equipment for the war effort. He was also responsible for large sums of money used to pay bounties to soldiers that the town convinced to enlist. He was one of the founders of Woburn National Bank, and on the death of the first president Abijah Thompson in 1868, he was elected as his successor. The next year (1869) he was elected a member of the Governor's Council for Massachusetts and was subsequently re-elected until 1873 when declining health forced him to retire from public life.

He died at his residence on Pleasant Street, in Woburn, early in the morning of 12 December 1873 from kidney disease. His funeral was a notable event and was attended by the Governor and his Council. Winn had been a liberal supporter of the Unitarian Church throughout his life, and in his will left the "First Unitarian Society" $5,000 for support. He also left $100,000 in a trust for his son, which would transfer to the society should his son die without any heirs, and $2,500 for the public library. His son Charles Bowers Winn, who had never been in good health, was the sole surviving heir and died two years later (19 December 1875) leaving the bulk of the estate to the library with the intent that most of the funds would be used to construct a new building that would be "an architectural ornament to the town." The bequest, which ultimately totaled more than $225,000, was "among the most liberal donations that had been made to an American public library to date." As for the bequest to the Unitarians, those moneys were to be disposed of under the direction of Edward Everett Hale, a Unitarian minister, and Andrew P. Peabody, Plummer Professor of Christian Morals at Harvard Divinity School. The two concluded that since Harvard Divinity School was founded by Unitarians, and the children of Unitarians favor the school, an endowed chair would be a suitable use for a portion of the funds. As a result, $43,500 was used to establish the Winn Professorship of Ecclesiastical History in 1877.
