= The Pillar =

American Catholic news website

- Type: Online news magazine
- Founders: JD Flynn; Ed Condon
- Editor-in-chief: JD Flynn
- Editor: Ed Condon
- Managing editor: Michelle La Rosa
- Founded: January 4, 2021; 5 years ago
- Language: English
- Website: pillarcatholic.com

The Pillar is an American news and investigative journalism website focusing on the Catholic Church. The site was founded in 2021 by two journalist canon lawyers: J.D. Flynn, former editor-in-chief of Catholic News Agency and former chancellor of the Archdiocese of Denver; and Ed Condon, former Washington, D.C., bureau editor of Catholic News Agency. The Pillar publishes news and analyses on the life of the church, abuse, church finances, and the interaction of the church and global politics. In July 2021, they received international coverage for publishing a controversial exposé on a top American church official's use of a location-based hookup app. By the end of that month, they had become the third-most-subscribed "faith" publication on Substack.

== Background ==
J.D. Flynn is an American canon lawyer. A revert to Catholicism, he grew up in New Jersey and attended Franciscan University of Steubenville as an undergraduate and received a JCL from Catholic University of America. He formerly worked at the Archdiocese of Denver from 2007 to 2013, spending 2011 to 2013 as chancellor. He later served as special assistant to Bishop James D. Conley in the Diocese of Lincoln, Nebraska, and from August 2017 to December 2020 was the editor-in-chief of Catholic News Agency. He has three children, two of whom are adopted with special needs.

Ed Condon is a British-American canon lawyer who received his JCD from Catholic University of America. Condon previously worked as the DC editor of the Catholic News Agency and an associate editor of the Catholic Herald. Prior to his work in Catholic spheres, he worked in politics in the United Kingdom. He is the nephew of former president of the Catholic University of America, John H. Garvey.

As co-workers at Catholic News Agency, Flynn and Condon hosted the popular CNA Editor's Desk podcast. According to the Washington Post, Flynn and Condon "stood out" as conservative journalists taking aim at holding the hierarchy of the Catholic Church accountable. In December 2020, Flynn and Condon announced their departure from Catholic News Agency, citing personal and family reasons, and launched The Pillar on January 4, 2021. By the end of July 2021, The Pillar was the third most popular "faith" Substack.

== Publication ==
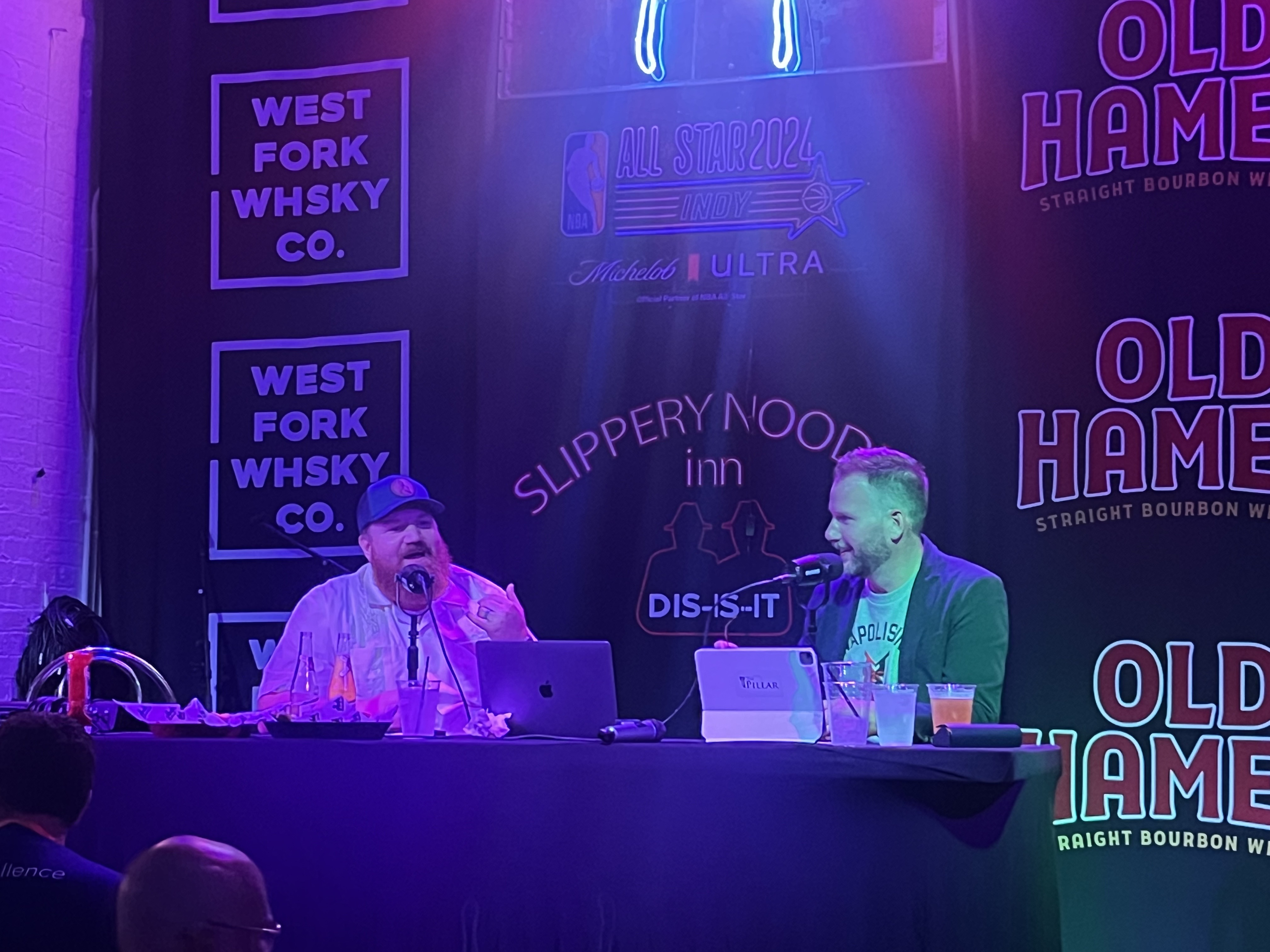
JD Flynn and Ed Condon, cofounders and editors of The Pillar, host a live podcast at the 10th National Eucharistic Congress in Indianapolis.

The Pillar publishes news, analyses, and interviews on Catholic news topics in the United States and worldwide, including Vatican finances, clerical sexual abuse, China–Holy See relations, the Catholic Church in Nicaragua, and general Catholic news topics. The site is free but subscription-supported. Some content, such as certain podcast bonus episodes and the Starting Seven daily news feed, are only accessible to paying subscribers.

The Pillar uses Substack and publishes two weekly newsletters on Tuesday and Friday containing summaries of the new articles published during the week. Flynn and Condon also host a weekly podcast self-described as "great Catholic conversation" wherein they discuss the news of the week. Europe editor Luke Coppen, former editor of the Catholic Herald, publishes a subscriber-only newsletter called Starting Seven containing the daily Vatican Press Bulletin, upcoming news to watch out for, and summaries of Catholic news of the day, including links to stories not necessarily published by the Pillar.

Flynn has been characterized as portraying as a "wholesome dad" in his editorials and on social media, while Condon "plays the cynical grump".

== Notable coverage ==
The Pillar has covered numerous stories of alleged sexual abuse or coverup by members of the Church and bishops, including the cases of former diocesan bishops Richard Stika of Knoxville and Michael Hoeppner of Crookston and cases at Franciscan University of Steubenville. They have also covered the case of Marko Rupnik, a Sloevenian Jesuit accused of sexually abusing nuns.

The Pillar has also extensively covered Vatican finances, including the trial of former Cardinal Giovanni Angelo Becciu, alleged mismanagement of CDF funds by Cardinal Gerhard Ludwig Müller, and other alleged mismanagement in the Administration of the Patrimony of the Apostolic See. It has also covered American diocesan finances. In early 2026, The Pillar reported on alleged financial and personal indiscretions of Emanuel Hana Shaleta, bishop of the Chaldean Cahtolic Eparchy of San Diego; Shaleta was arrested as he attempted to leave the country shortly after the reporting broke.

In October 2025, Edgar Beltrán, the Pillar's Rome correspondent, was assaulted while interviewing the Venezuelan Archbishop Edgar Peña Parra. Ricardo Cisneros, a businessman and member of the Venezuelan government's delegation in Rome for the canonization of José Gregorio Hernández and Carmen Elena Rendiles Martínez, interrupted Beltrán and grabbed his recorder after Beltrán asked a question around the "apparent politicization" of the canonizations by the Venezuelan government. The International Association of Journalists Accredited to the Vatican released a statement condemning the incident. In an interview, Pietro Parolin, the Cardinal Secretary of State, expressed concern about increasing attacks on free speech.

=== Clerical use of location-based dating apps ===
In July 2021, The Pillar published a story which reported on cell phone location data which showed that Monsignor Jeffrey Burrill, the top administrator of the United States Conference of Catholic Bishops, had frequented gay bars and the Grindr app.

Burrill resigned from the USCCB after The Pillar notified the USCCB that it was going to publish the story. The site's methods of obtaining Burrill's location history were legal, but raised privacy concerns. In a Religion News Service column appearing in The Washington Post, theology professor Steven P. Millies decried the investigation as "unethical, homophobic innuendo" and wrote that The Pillar "must not have thought about the Code of Canon Law" and "The Pillar's investigators paid little heed also to the canons of ethics for journalists". Others, including Matthew Hennessey of The Wall Street Journal, dismissed allegations of homophobic intent while applauding the reporting with a favorable comparison to similar phone data-based reporting by The New York Times.

Later in 2021 The Pillar also reported that Vatican employees were using hookup apps within secure areas of the Vatican inaccessible to the public, which The Pillar called a diplomatic blackmail security risk. Cardinal Pietro Parolin, the Secretary of State of Holy See, met with Flynn and Condon to discuss the issue.
