= Ray Madding McConnell =

American instructor of social ethics (1875–1911)

Ray Madding McConnell (1875–1911) was an instructor of social ethics at Harvard University.

McConnell received a Ph.D. in philosophy from Harvard in 1908, a STB from Vanderbilt University, and an AB from Southern University in Alabama.

== Works ==
- The Duty of Altruism, New York: MacMillan, 1910

McConnell reviews the various methods by which people have tried to prove the universal validity of certain ethical frameworks, and shows how they fail. He recommends instead a more descriptive moral science that respects the particular circumstances and nature of each individual, and the subjective ethics that results from this, rather than trying to impose a universal generic ethics on everyone.

- Criminal Responsibility and Social Constraint, New York: Charles Scribner's Sons, 1912

McConnell reviews the various justifications usually given for punishing criminals (expiation, retribution, deterrence, and reformation), and finds these lacking. He promotes in their place a principle he calls "social utility", which incorporates the useful features of the failed theories, but solely in the service of the protection of society, and solely on utilitarian grounds. He justifies this in part on what he sees as the evident truth of determinism, which undermines some of the moral intuitions used to justify other theories of punishment.
