= Ephraim Emerton =

American educator, author, translator, and historian

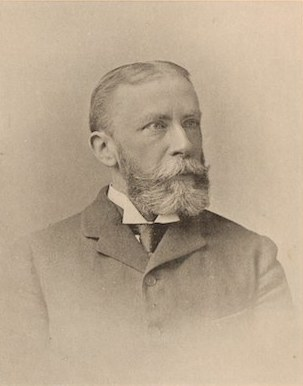
- Born: February 18, 1851
- Died: March 3, 1935 (aged 84)
- Occupation: Writer
- Awards: Fellow of the Medieval Academy of America (1927)

Ephraim Emerton (February 18, 1851 – March 3, 1935) was an American educator, author, translator, and historian prominent in his field of European medieval history.

== Early life and education ==
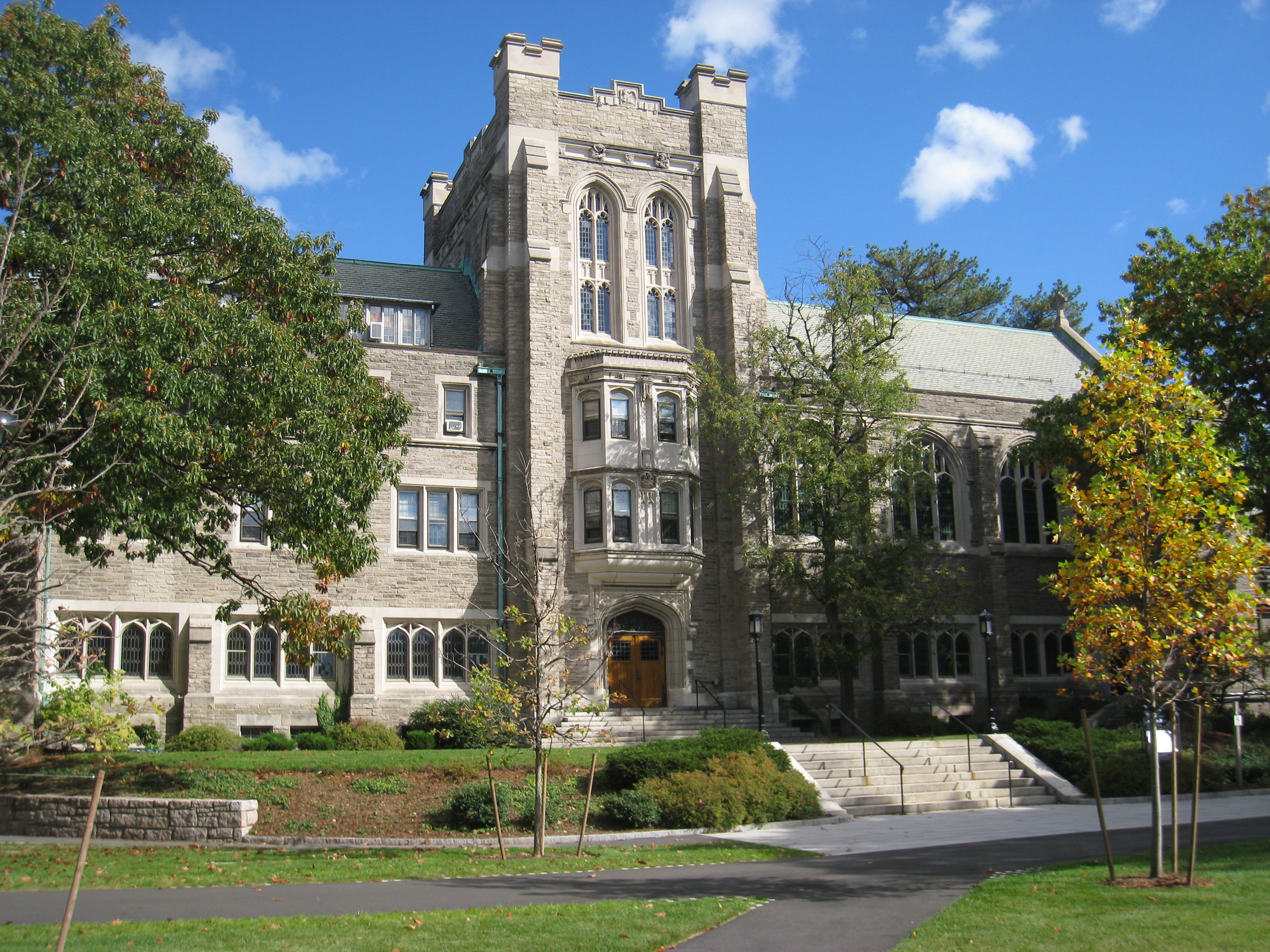
Harvard Divinity School, Cambridge, Massachusetts

Ephraim Emerton was born in Salem, Massachusetts, to James and Martha West Emerton. His elder brother was James Henry Emerton (1847–1930), naturalist and arachnologist.

At the age of twenty, Emerton graduated from Harvard College. He continued his postgraduate education in Germany and received his doctorate from the University of Leipzig in 1876. Returning to Massachusetts the following year, he married Sybil M. Clark of Cambridge and accepted a teaching position at Harvard.

== Academic career ==
Emerton served at first as an instructor in both History and German language. He eventually became Harvard's foremost professor of Ecclesiastical History, and served on the faculty for forty-two years (1876–1918). A devout Unitarian, he taught at the Harvard Divinity School and most of his writings deal with religious figures and issues. In 1882, he was appointed to a Harvard chair as Winn Professor of Ecclesiastical History, the first such professorship bestowed by the Winn financial endowment.

In 1884, Emerton became one of the founders of the oldest and largest historians' society in the United States, the American Historical Association. Throughout his life he was active in numerous academic organizations including the New England History Teachers' Association, the Massachusetts Historical Society, the Essex Institute and the American Academy of Arts and Sciences of which he was a Fellow.

Emerton retired from teaching on September 1, 1918 and he was granted the title of professor emeritus. In his retirement he continued his historical research and translation work. He remained active with academic groups and, in 1921, he accepted the position of president of the Cambridge Historical Society. He died at his home in Cambridge on March 3, 1935 at the age of eighty-four.

== Works ==
The Dutch theologian Erasmus (1466–1536) was the inspiration for Emerton's Desiderius Erasmus of Rotterdam, first published as one section of a multi-author compilation called Heroes of the Reformation. Published as a standalone book in 1899, it is regarded by scholars as his greatest historical work.

Emerton frequently contributed to larger works, writing articles for books, journals, and even the New York Evening Post. He was an authoritative contributor to the New International Encyclopedia (1914), and provided the full entries for Erasmus and the papacy.

Emerton also authored several widely read textbooks for high school and college students, including Mediaeval Europe, 814–1300 and An Introduction to the Study of the Middle Ages (375-814), which were highly acclaimed by his contemporaries. Professor Emerton's texts were standard reading within the American educational system for decades after their publication.

A facility for languages never left Emerton, and the translation of medieval German and Latin texts to contemporary English language was his special occupation. One of his most enduring efforts is a translation of the letters of Saint Boniface, the last work published before his death.

Emerton's body of work includes:

=== Books ===
- Synopsis of the history of continental Europe, 800-1250. Cambridge: W.H. Wheeler. 1880. OCLC 19021084.
- Mediaeval Europe, 814–1300. Boston: Ginn & Co. 1894. OCLC 391878.
- An Introduction to the Study of the Middle Ages (375-814). Boston: Ginn & Co. 1899. OCLC 560266601.
- Desiderius Erasmus of Rotterdam. New York: G.P. Putnam's Sons. 1899. OCLC 312661. "Desiderius Erasmus of Rotterdam."
- Unitarian Thought. New York: Macmillan Co. 1911. OCLC 1403642. "Unitarian Thought."
- Beginnings of Modern Europe (1250–1450). Boston: Ginn & Co. 1917. OCLC 484803. "Beginnings of Modern Europe (1250-1450)."
- The Defensor Pacis of Marsiglio of Padua: A Critical Study. Cambridge: Harvard University Press. 1920. OCLC 257462319. "The Defensor Pacis of Marsiglio of Padua."
- Learning and Living:Academic Essays. Cambridge: Harvard University Press. 1921. OCLC 697952360.
- Humanism and Tyranny, Studies in the Italian Trecento. Cambridge: Harvard University Press. 1925. OCLC 1561687.
- The correspondence of Pope Gregory VII: Selected letters from the Registrum. New York: Columbia University Press. 1932. ISBN 9780231096270. OCLC 1471578.
- The letters of Saint Boniface. New York: Macmillan Co. 1934. ISBN 9780231120920. OCLC 499912626.

=== Pamphlets, booklets, articles ===
- "The Calvin celebration : Four hundredth anniversary of his birth". The Evening Post (July 10). New York Evening Post Co. 1909. OCLC 171293674.
- Emerton, Ephraim (1915). "Fra Salimbene and the Franciscan Ideal". Harvard Theological Review. 8 (4): 480–503. doi:10.1017/s0017816000009196. JSTOR 1507265. S2CID 162895403.
- Diesterweg, Friedrich Adolph Wilhelm. "The Historical Seminary in American Teaching". Methods of Teaching History. Boston: Ginn, Heath, & Co. pp. 11–200.

=== Other ===
- Papers of Ephraim Emerton, 1891–1930, a collection of notes and lectures including a sound recording, is in the permanent collection of the Harvard University Library (OCLC 77069261).

Academic offices
New creation	Winn Professor of Ecclesiastical History; 1882–1918	Succeeded by Kirsopp Lake
