= Catholic Biblical Quarterly =

Theology journal

- Editor: Leslie J. Hoppe, O.F.M.
- Categories: Theology, Old Testament, New Testament
- Frequency: Quarterly
- Publisher: Catholic Biblical Association of America
- First issue: 1939
- Country: United States
- Language: English
- Website: CBQ
- ISSN: 0008-7912

The Catholic Biblical Quarterly is a refereed peer-reviewed theology journal published by the Catholic Biblical Association of America (CBA) in January, April, July, and October. It was established in 1939 and its circulation in 2010 was over 3,800.

The journal publishes both scholarly articles and has an extensive section for book reviews. In 2018, the General Editor of the journal was Leslie J. Hoppe. In 2021, Corrine Carvalho became the new General Editor.
