= Winn Memorial Library =

- Woburn Public Library
- U.S. National Register of Historic Places
- U.S. National Historic Landmark
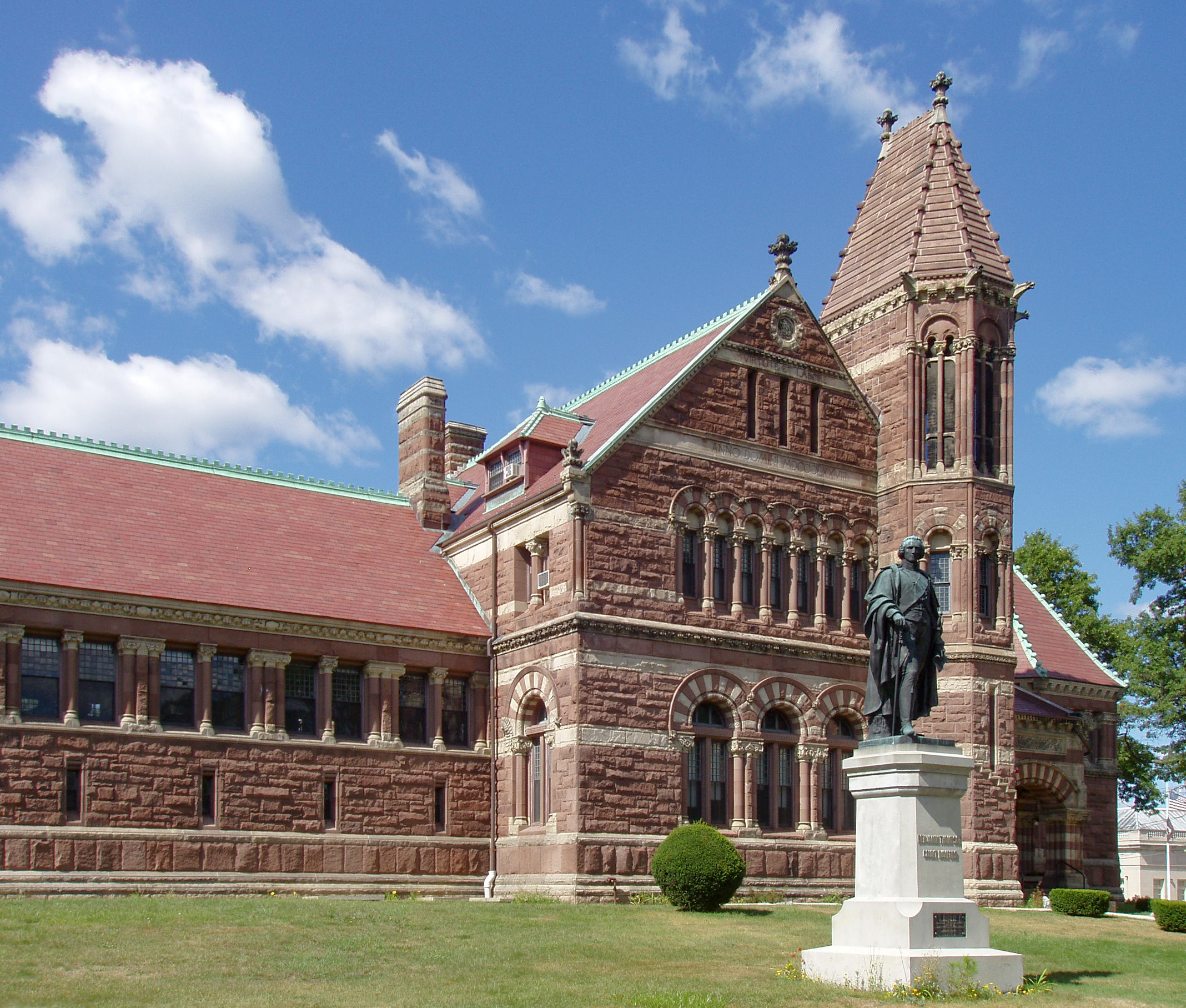

- Location within Massachusetts Location within the United States
- Location: 45 Pleasant Street, Woburn, Massachusetts
- Coordinates: 42°28′44″N 71°9′18″W
- Area: 1.7 acres (0.69 ha)
- Built: 1879
- Architect: H. H. Richardson; Norcross Brothers
- Architectural style: Romanesque
- NRHP reference No.: 76000290

Significant dates
- Added to NRHP: November 13, 1976
- Designated NHL: December 23, 1987

Woburn Public Library, previously known as the Winn Memorial Library, is a National Historic Landmark in Woburn, Massachusetts. Designed by architect H. H. Richardson, the Romanesque Revival building was a bequest of the Winn family and built from 1876 to 1879. It houses the Woburn Public Library, an institution that was established in 1856.

== History ==
The first librarian of the Winn Memorial Library was George Mather Champney. In 1851, with the formation of the first town library, Champney served as Chairman of the Library Committee and worked to develop the library. After Charles B. Winn's death in 1875, Champney took a leading role in planning for the new library that the town would build with the Winn endowment. He spent considerable time and energy acquiring books for the library, and became the first librarian in the new building when it opened in 1879. George Champney wrote a history of the library for the Woburn Journal in November of 1881. Less than two months later, on January 4, 1882, Champney died on the front porch of the library, at the age of 69.

The library is also home to the Dr. Thomas J. Glennon Archives. The Glennon Archives holds many important records dating back to Woburn's early history in the 1600s. The Archives maintains more than two hundred separate manuscript collections relating to Woburn's history, several special collections of books including a rare book collection, tens of thousands of photographs, a fine art collection, and a museum. Many of the Archives' museum objects can be viewed in the Historical Artifacts Room, located in the Octagon Room of the Richardson Building.

An expansion of the library was approved in 2015. In 2019, the library completed a $33 million renovation project, adding 30,500 square feet (2,830 m^{2}) . The new addition includes a maker space, a teen room, a program room, a climate-controlled archives and reading room, and a children's department which is complemented by a craft room and play area. The library was subsequently honored with a 2023 AIA/ALA Award for Library Design.

== Architecture ==
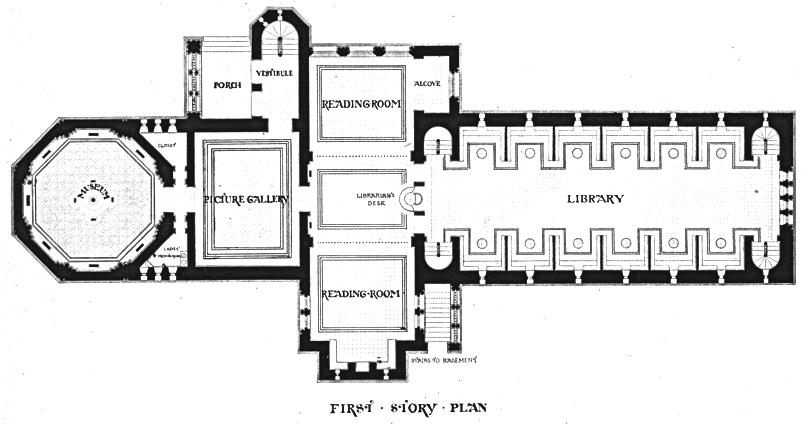
First floor plan, 1877

The library is properly called the "Woburn Public Library". The Winn family paid to construct the building and provide an endowment for the library but specifically requested that it not be named for them. Nevertheless, Richardson signed his plans "Winn Library", and it remains known in architectural circles as "Winn Memorial Library". The inscription in the entrance porch reads: "This building was erected in memory of Jonathan Bowers Winn from funds bequeathed by his son, for the use, benefit and improvement of the people of Woburn."

It was built between 1876 and 1879 and was the first in a series of libraries designed by Richardson. In it he established a characteristic basilical plan for such buildings: an off-axis entrance marked by a staircase tower; a vestibule opening into a high-ceilinged reception area; reading room(s) adjacent to the stacks; and an optional art gallery. The building was designated a National Historic Landmark in 1987 in recognition of its architectural significance.

The library's main (south) facade presents a long, two-story stack wing to the west (left), slit windows on the first story with a strip of clerestory windows separated by columns above, all below a peaked roof. The gable-ended crossing (center) features a trio of arched double windows on the first story, a line of seven arched single windows above, and an attached High Victorian tower. On the opposite side of the tower is the arch of the entrance porch. The easternmost section is an attached two-and-a-half-story octagonal wing that houses the library's museum. The building's polychromatic exterior is constructed of brownstone trimmed with lighter stone, sometimes laid in bands, and set in alternating colors over the main arches and the entrance porch. This is all beneath a red tile roof trimmed with bronze cresting, with crocketed ribs on the roofs of the tower and museum.

The interior features a reception room/picture gallery with the museum to the right and a trio of reading rooms to the left. Beyond the reading rooms are the two-story stacks that feature a tall 6-arch arcade on each side, topped by a wooden barrel-vaulted ceiling. There are curved staircases at the four corners of the stacks, in addition to the main stair in the tower.

A statue of native son and notable scientist Sir Benjamin Thompson, Count Rumford, stands on the main lawn before the library.

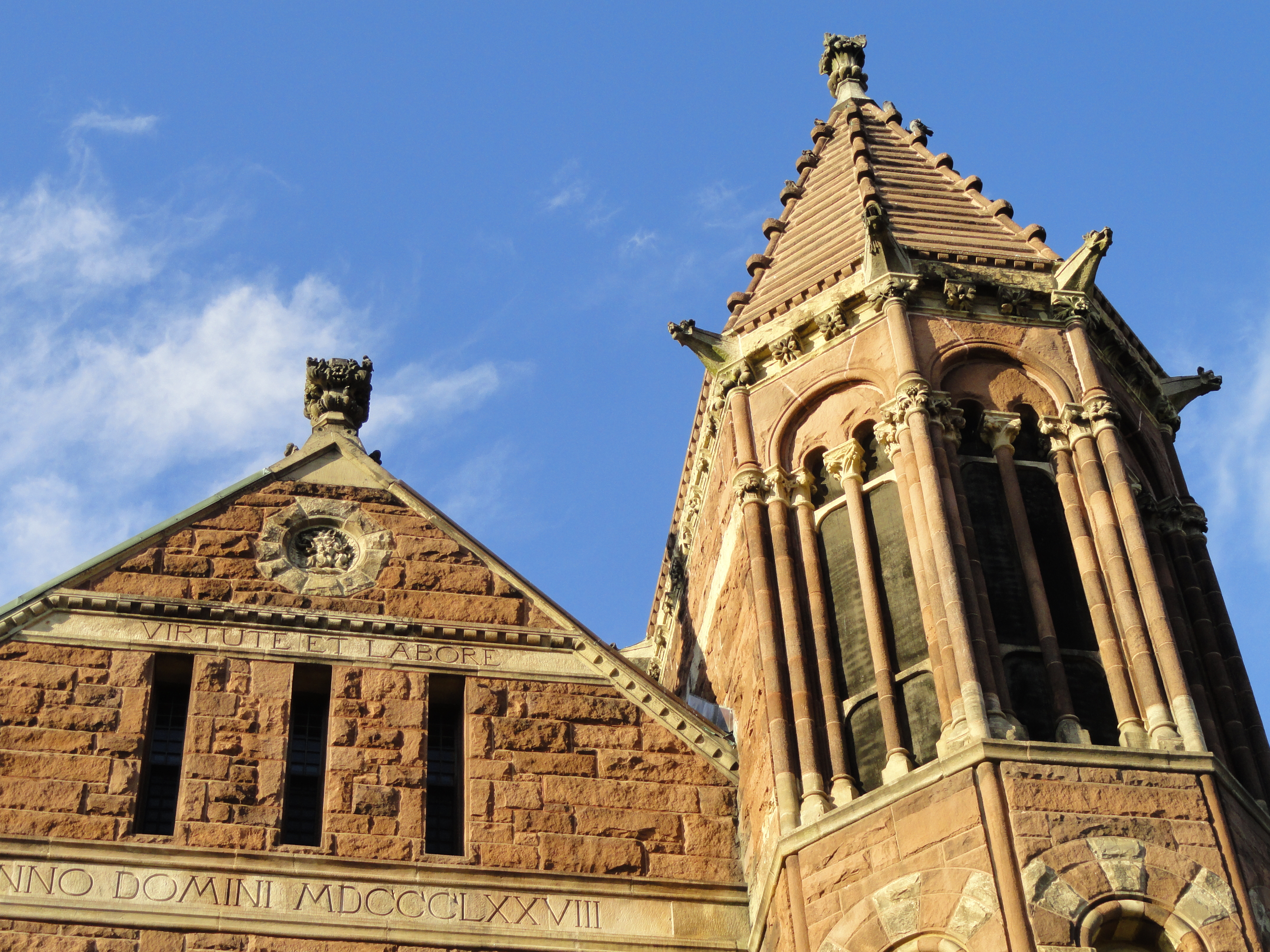
Gable and tower.

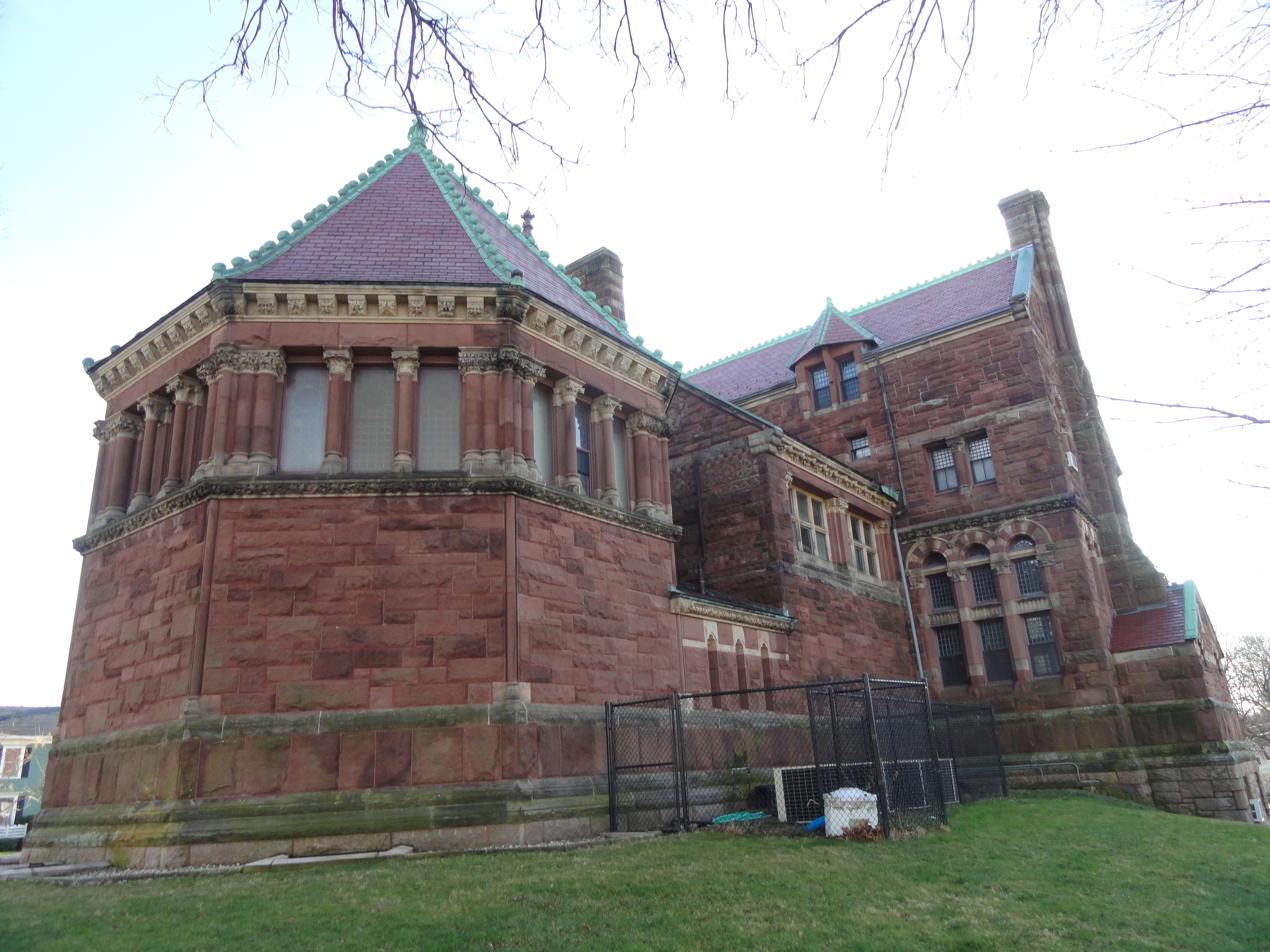
Museum exterior.

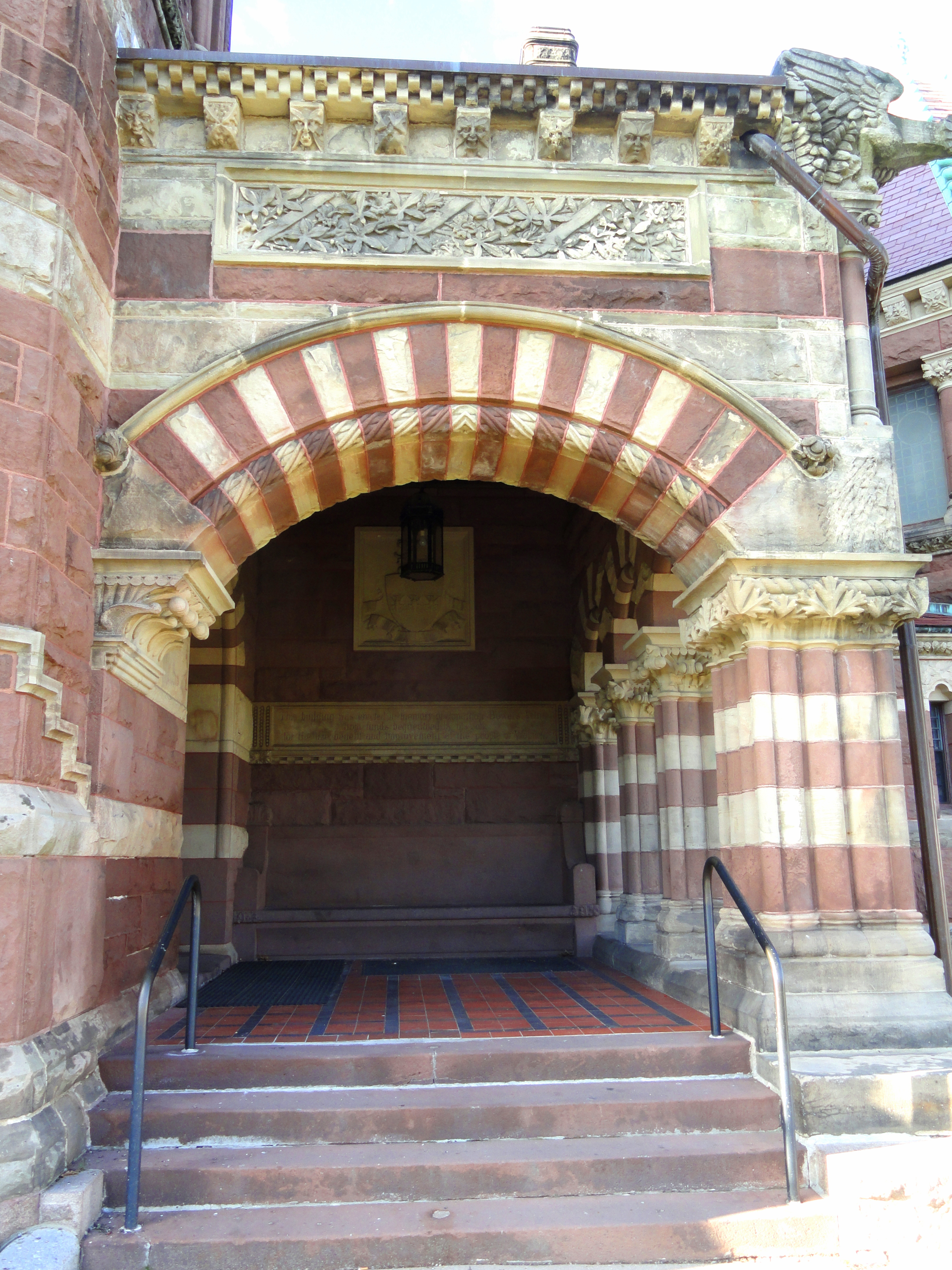
Entrance porch.

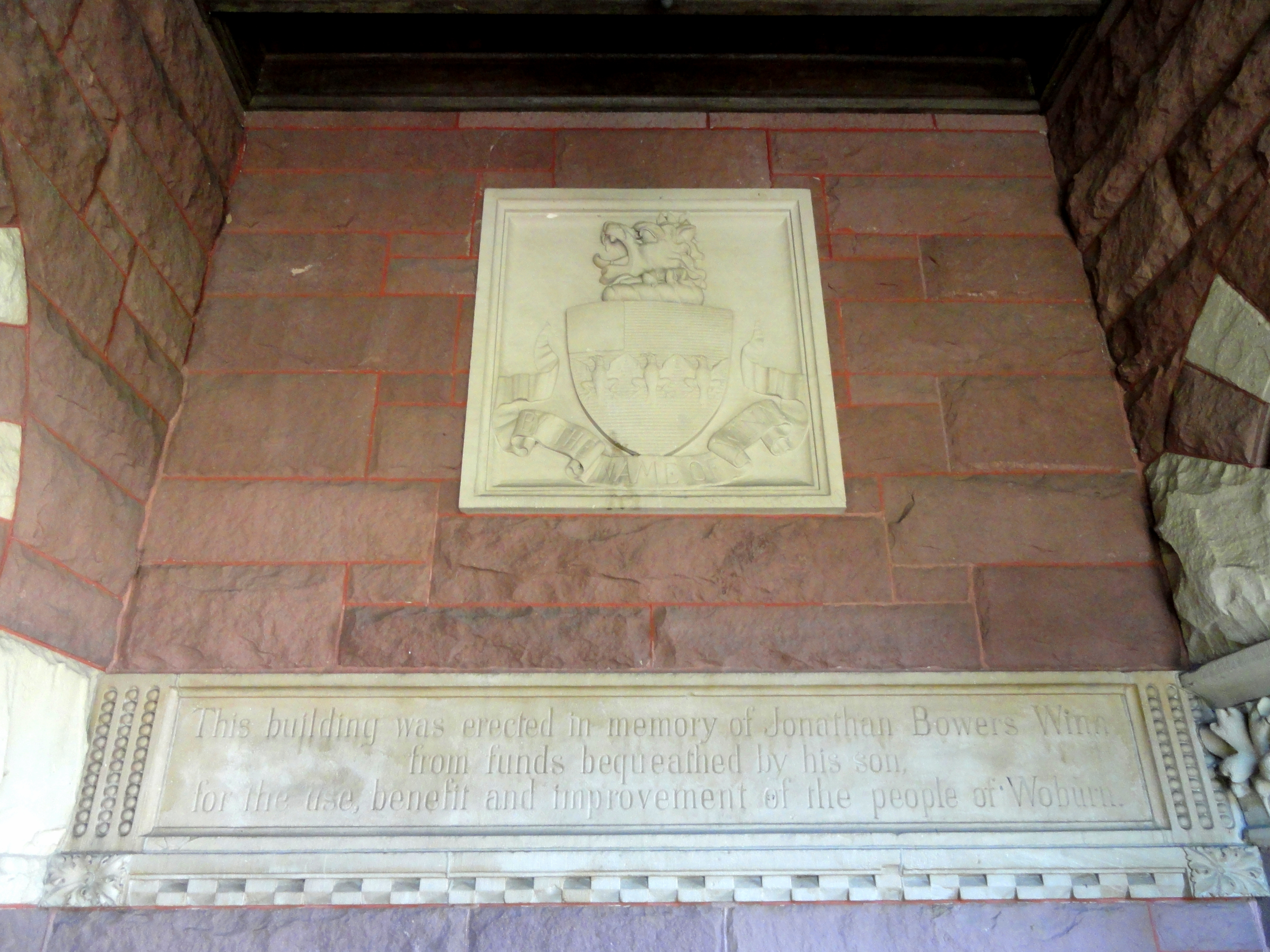
Memorial plaque.

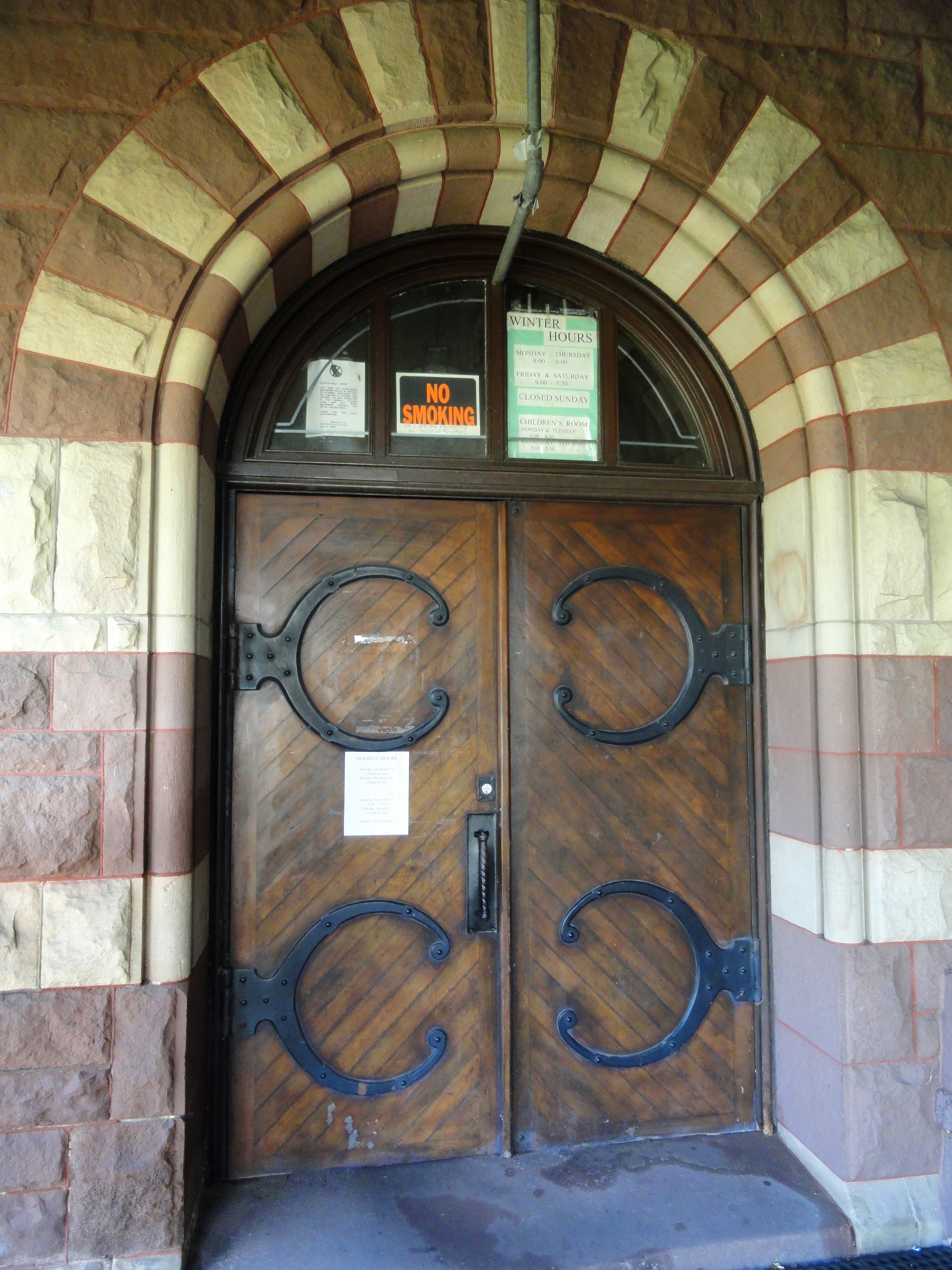
Entrance.

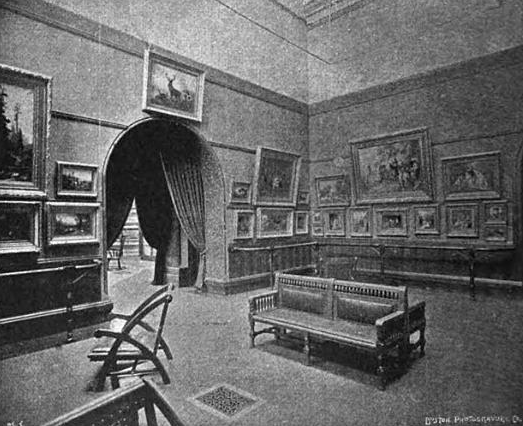
Reception room/picture gallery, ca.1890.

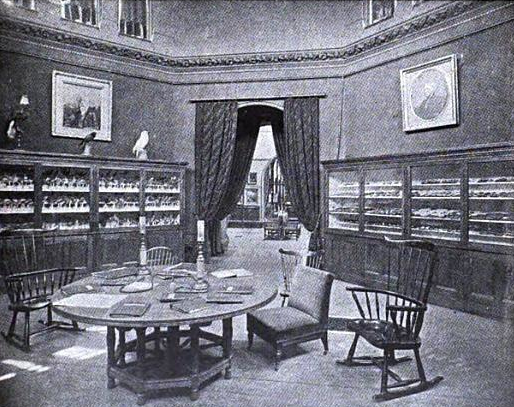
Museum/natural history room, ca.1890.

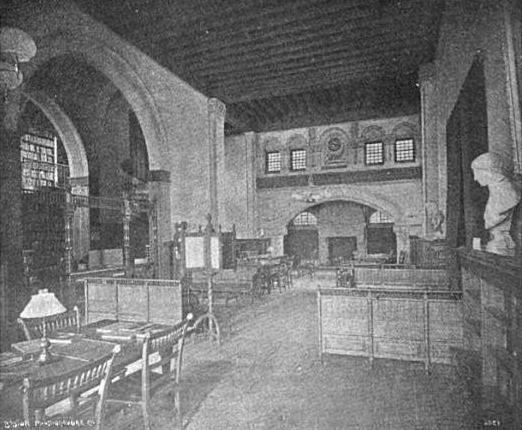
Reading rooms, ca.1890.

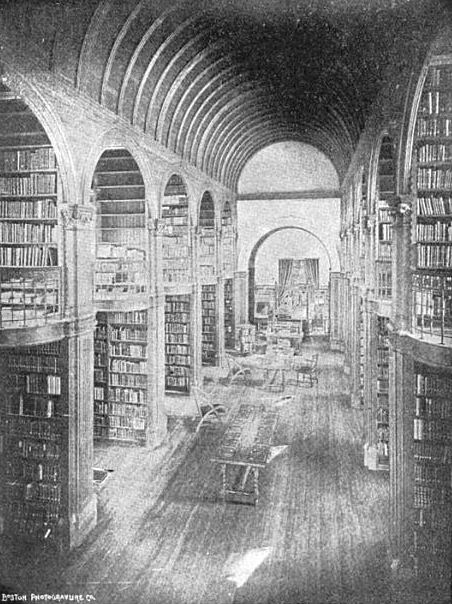
Book stacks, ca.1890.

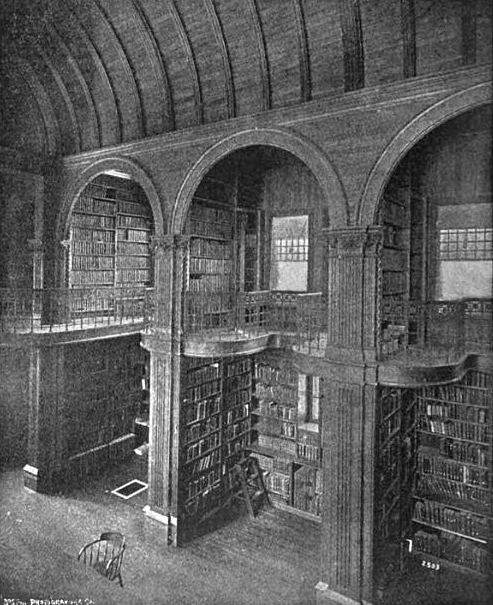
Book stacks, ca.1890.

== See also ==
- National Register of Historic Places listings in Middlesex County, Massachusetts
- List of National Historic Landmarks in Massachusetts
- William Richard Cutter
- Benjamin Champney
