= Leslie J. Hoppe =

Biblical scholar

Leslie J. Hoppe OFM (born 22 September 1944) is an American Franciscan priest and Old Testament scholar with a focus on Deuteronomy and Deuteronomic literature and is an expert in biblical studies. He is Carroll Stuhlmueller Distinguished Professor of Old Testament Studies at Catholic Theological Union in Chicago and the general editor of the refereed theological journal Catholic Biblical Quarterly.

Between 2015-2016, he served as president of the Catholic Biblical Association and has also served as the president of the Chicago Society of Biblical Research and was visiting professor at Garrett-Evangelical Theological Seminary, Studium Biblicum Franciscanum, and Seabury-Western Theological Seminary. He has served on the editorial board of The Bible Today and Old Testament Abstracts, previously being the general editor of the former.

== Education ==
Hoppe first received his MA in theology from the Aquinas Institute of Theology and then went on to receive a PhD in religion from Northwestern University.

== Career ==
Hoppe joined and has been on the faculty of Catholic Theological Union (CTU) since 1981. Since then, he has authored many books on the Old Testament and biblical archaeology and has served in many archaeological projects in Upper Galilee as well as being the director of the fall study program of CTU in Jerusalem and lead its first Holy Land Pilgrimage. He has written a number of scholarly articles and books, including The Holy City: Jerusalem in the Theology of the Old Testament (2000) and was one of the archaeologists to work on the hypothesis of a House of Peter at Capernaum. He has written for America Magazine and has outlined his views on the Bible in an interview with US Catholic magazine. He has been noted by the National Catholic Register for his support of the Dei verbum to Catholic life and scripture, and believes the question of archaeology is separate from belief in the Bible.

== Publications ==
=== Books ===
- The Book of Isaiah: The Fifth Gospel (2016).
- Caesarea Maritima (Oxford 2013)
- Priests, Prophets, and Sages: Catholic Perspectives on the Old Testament (2006).
- New Light from Old Stories: Hebrew Scriptures for Today’s World (2005)
- There shall be no poor among you: Poverty in the Bible (Abingdon Press 2004).
- A Retreat with Matthew: Going Beyond the Law (2000).
- The Holy City: Jerusalem in the Theology of the Old Testament (2000).
- A guide to the lands of the Bible (1999)
- The synagogues and churches of ancient Palestine (1994)
- A New Heart: A Commentary on the Book of Ezekiel (Eerdmans 1991).
- Being Poor: A Biblical Study (1987).
- Deuteronomy (1985)
- What are they saying about biblical archaeology? (Paulist Press 1984)
- Joshua, Judges: with an excursus on charismatic leadership in Israel (1982)

=== Articles and Chapters ===
- "The Strategy of the Deuteronomistic History: A Proposal." Catholic Biblical Quarterly 79.1 (2017).
- “A Place for Prayer: Solomon’s Prayer at the Dedication of the Temple (2 Kgs 8)” in Prayer in the Catholic Tradition: A Handbook of Practical Approaches. (2016): 467-478.
- "Vatican II: Some Reminiscences After Fifty Years." New Theology Review 25.2 (2013): 59-61.
- “Vengeance and Forgiveness: The Two Faces of Psalm 79” in Images and Imagination in Biblical Literature. (Washington: CBA, 2001): 1-22.
- "Israel Constructs Its History: Deuteronomistic Historiography in Recent Research." The Catholic Biblical Quarterly 64.2 (2002): 408.
- "Judges." The Catholic Biblical Quarterly 63.2 (2001): 307.
- "The Afterlife of a Text. The Case of Solomon’s Prayer in 1 Kings 8." Liber Annuus 51 (2001): 9-30.
- "Scribing the Center: Organization and Redaction in Deuteronomy 14: 1-17: 13." Hebrew Studies 38.1 (1997): 123-125.
- "Deuteronomy" in The Collegeville Bible Commentary: Based on the New American Bible with Revised New Testament. (Liturgical Press, 1989): 196-228.
- "Isaiah 58: 1-12, Fasting and Idolatry." Biblical Theology Bulletin 13.2 (1983): 44-47.
- "The Meaning of Deuteronomy." Biblical Theology Bulletin 10.3 (1980): 111-117.
