= David Steinmetz (historian) =

American historian (1936-2015)

- Born: June 12, 1936; Columbus, Ohio, U.S.
- Died: November 26, 2015 (aged 79)
- Education: Wheaton College; Drew University; Harvard University

David Curtis Steinmetz (June 12, 1936 – November 26, 2015) was an American historian of late medieval and early modern Christianity.

Born in Columbus, Ohio, Steinmetz received his BA in English from Wheaton College in Illinois (1958) and his BD from Drew University (1961). In 1961 he was ordained an elder in the Methodist Church. He moved to Harvard University, where he took a Th.D. (1967) under the direction of the prominent Dutch Reformation historian Heiko Oberman. Before coming to Duke University, where he spent most of his academic career, he taught for five years (1966-1971) at Lancaster Theological Seminary. At the Duke Divinity School, he served as the Amos Ragan Kearns Distinguished Professor of the History of Christianity and was elected Fellow of the American Academy of Arts and Sciences in 2006. He also served as a visiting professor at Harvard (1977), Notre Dame (1993, 1997, 2005, 2008), and Emory (2010) universities.

In 1959 Steinmetz married Virginia Ruth Verploegh, an English teacher from Chicago whom he met at Wheaton. Virginia earned her MA in English at Temple University and her Ph.D. at Duke University. She taught for several years at Meredith College in Raleigh, North Carolina, before she was appointed as Duke's first director of graduate student career services. The couple have two children: Claire Elise and Matthew Eliot.

Steinmetz taught courses at Duke in four departments: the historical division of the Divinity School, the joint program in Graduate Religion, the Center for Medieval and Renaissance Studies, and the Department of German. In 1985 he was elected president of the American Society of Church History. In 1986 he was chosen as the first president of the American Friends of the Herzog August Bibliothek in Germany.

In addition to his reputation as a productive scholar, Steinmetz was known as a lively and entertaining lecturer, who could win over students disinclined to take history seriously, No one was therefore surprised when he won a teaching prize in 1986 and was named the Duke University Scholar/Teacher of the year. His prose style, written and spoken, was admired by critics for its clarity, its elegance, and its dry humor.

Steinmetz was an intellectual historian and a specialist in the history of Christian thought in late medieval and early modern Europe. His earliest works explored the reception of the teaching of St. Augustine in the later Middle Ages, determining if possible the intellectual influence such late medieval Augustinianism might have exercised on Martin Luther.

Luther's early thought was often articulated in biblical commentaries and lectures. This fact led Steinmetz to take a fresh look at the history of biblical interpretation. Typically, historians were satisfied if they tried to analyze Luther's hermeneutical theory (rather than his exegesis). But Steinmetz was dissatisfied with what he regarded as an exclusive interest in hermeneutics and concluded that such an approach, while useful, was woefully inadequate.

What historians needed was something more than a critical review of interpretive theory; what they needed was a wholesale immersion of their minds in the exegesis itself. Steinmetz argued that exegesis could not be understood properly in isolation from its own larger context. Unless historians developed a comparative approach to their texts, reading as many commentaries as possible on each biblical passage, they would never understand what biblical exegesis could tell them about the intellectual world they were studying.

Steinmetz shifted the focus of his studies from Luther's early theology to the theology and exegesis of Luther's younger contemporary, John Calvin. Using as many as 60 early modern commentaries on Paul's Letter to the Romans, Steinmetz looked at Calvin's theological development through the lens of medieval and early modern interpretations of Paul. By placing Calvin's exegesis in its proper context he could now tell Calvin's ordinary comments (broadly shared by his contemporaries) from his original insights.

The late Heiko Oberman characterized Steinmetz's study of Calvin as an "exquisite contribution to Calvin scholarship" that "succeeds in tracing the precise profile of Calvin as biblical interpreter." Barbara Pitkin called his Calvin scholarship a "collection of path-breaking studies" that "set investigation into Calvin's biblical interpretation on a new footing,"[2]

In 1996 Steinmetz was honored by his students with a Festschrift, Biblical Interpretation in the Era of the Reformation, and in 2006 was elected a Fellow of the American Academy of Arts and Sciences. In 2008 he and his wife endowed the annual Steinmetz Lectures in Historical Theology. Shortly thereafter (2009) he retired as the Kearns Distinguished Professor Emeritus and was awarded the Distinguished Career Award of the American Society of Church History (2010). At the same time (2010) Emory University offered him a visiting post as the McDonald Distinguished Professor of History, a gift that enabled him to lay the intellectual foundations for his next book, The Catholic Calvin.

== Selected bibliography ==
Misericordia Dei: The Theology of Johannes von Staupitz in its Late Medieval Setting. Studies in Medieval and Reformation Thought IV. Leiden: E.J. Brill, 1968.

Reformers in the Wings. Philadelphia: Fortress Press, 1971. Paperback edition: Grand Rapids: Baker, 1981. Reformers in the Wings: From Geiler von Kaysersberg to Theodore Beza, Second revised edition. New York: Oxford University Press, 2000. Hardbound and paperback editions.

Luther and Staupitz: An Essay in the Intellectual Origins of the Protestant Reformation. Duke University Monographs in Medieval and Renaissance Studies 4. Durham, NC: Duke University Press, 1980.

Luther in Context. Bloomington: Indiana University Press, 1986. Hardbound and paperback editions. New paperback edition, Baker, 1995. Revised and expanded second edition, Baker, 2002.

Memory and Mission: Theological Reflections on the Christian Past. Nashville: Abingdon Press, 1988.

Editor, The Bible in the Sixteenth Century, Duke University Monographs in Medieval and Renaissance Studies11, Durham and London: Duke University Press, 1990. Paperback edition, 1996.

Calvin in Context. New York: Oxford University Press, 1995. Hardbound and paperback editions. Second revised and expanded edition, Oxford, 2010.

Senior Editor, Theology, Oxford Encyclopedia of the Reformation, 4 vols.. New York: Oxford University Press, 1996.

Editor, Die Patristik in der Bibelexegese des 16. Jahrhunderts. Wolfenbütteler Forschungen 85. Wiesbaden: Otto Harrassowitz, 1999.

Co-editor with David Bagchi, The Cambridge Companion to Reformation Theology, Cambridge: Cambridge University Press, 2004. Hardbound and paperback editions.

Taking the Long View. Christian Theology in Historical Perspective New York: Oxford University Press, 2011.

In addition to his own writings, Steinmetz was the senior editor of Oxford Studies in Historical Theology, Oxford University Press, 1994- .
