= John T. Pawlikowski =

American Servite priest (1940–2026)

John Thaddeus Pawlikowski, O.S.M. (November 2, 1940 – June 26, 2026) was an American Servite priest, Professor Emeritus of Social Ethics, and Director of the Catholic-Jewish Studies Program, part of The Bernardin Center for Theology and Ministry, at Catholic Theological Union (CTU) in Chicago. He was a resident at Assumption Church in the River North section of Chicago.

As a member of Catholic Theological Union from 1968, Pawlikowski was appointed to the United States Holocaust Memorial Council in 1980 by then-President Jimmy Carter. He was subsequently re-appointed by Presidents George H. W. Bush and Bill Clinton. As of 2008, he chaired the council's Subcommittee on Church Relations and served on its executive committee, the Committee on Conscience, and academic committee. Pawlikowski also served as president of the International Council of Christians and Jews (ICCJ) from 2002 to 2008.

== Biography ==
Pawlikowski was born on November 2, 1940, in Chicago, Illinois, the son of Thaddeus John and Anna Mary (née Mizera) Pawlikowski. After high school, he entered the Order of the Servants of Mary in 1958, and subsequently enrolled at Loyola University Chicago, graduating with a Bachelor of Arts degree in 1963. He continued his priestly studies in Northern Ireland, only to return to the United States and eventually graduate from the University of Saint Mary of the Lake (Mundelein Seminary). Pawlikowski was then ordained to the priesthood in 1967, and a year later became one of the founding faculty members of Catholic Theological Union. In 1970, he received a Doctor of Philosophy degree in social ethics from The University of Chicago. He also studied, for a time, at the University of Wisconsin-Madison and Mansfield College, University of Oxford. In addition to his teaching responsibilities at CTU, he also completed fellowships at St. Edmund's College, University of Cambridge and the Catholic University of Leuven.

His students at the Catholic Theological Union included a young Robert Prevost, who was elected Pope Leo XIV in the 2025 conclave. Pawlikowski remembered Prevost as "a pretty bright student… My experience of him was he’s a very open-minded person who’s very much in the context of Vatican II." Under Pawlikowski, Prevost studied Catholic social teaching.

Pawlikowski died on June 26, 2026, at the age of 85.

== Views ==
Pawlikowski was critical of John Cornwell's book Hitler's Pope, which criticizes the record of Pope Pius XII and the Vatican during the Holocaust. Pawlikowski characterized Cornwell's book as "full of exaggerated claims and deceptions," "a work of deeply flawed scholarship" that "presents only the evidence that suggests [Cornwell's] predetermined view."

Pawlikowski told the Jewish Telegraph Agency in 2025 "I’ve always argued that antisemitism is something that has to be counted as part of the Catholic commitment to social justice and human dignity. My work on Catholic social teaching did include always the issue of antisemitism.”

== Awards ==
- "The Righteous Among the Nations Award" from the Holocaust Museum in Detroit (1986)
- Raoul Wallenberg Humanitarian Award for Distinguished Contributions to Religion, from The American Jewish Committee (AJC) [1989]
- "Man of Reconciliation" Award from The Polish Council of Christians and Jews (1994)
- The Nostra Aetate Award from the Archdiocese of Chicago (1995)
- Distinguished Service Award from the American Jewish Committee (AJC) [Chicago]
- Officers' Cross of Merit for Distinguished Service to the Polish Nation, from the Government of Poland (1995)
- Eternal Flame Award from St. Leo University and the American Jewish Committee (AJC) [1999]
- "The Heart to Heart" Award from the Polish National Church in Lublin, Poland (2000)
- Named an "Illustrious Person and Honorary Citizen" of Montevideo by the City Council of Montevideo, Uruguay (2001)
- Honorary Doctorate from Hebrew Union College-Jewish Institute of Religion (2001)
- Bernard Nath Award from The Anti-Defamation League (ADL) [Chicago] (2003)
- Honorary Doctorate from Dominican University (2005)
- Shevet Achim Award from the Council of Centers on Jewish-Christian Relations (CCJR) [2012]
- Honorary Doctorate from Australian Catholic University (ACU) [2014]
- John Courtney Murray Award for significant contributions in the field of Catholic Theology, from the Catholic Theological Society of America (2014)
