= Andrew Gow (historian) =

Canadian historian

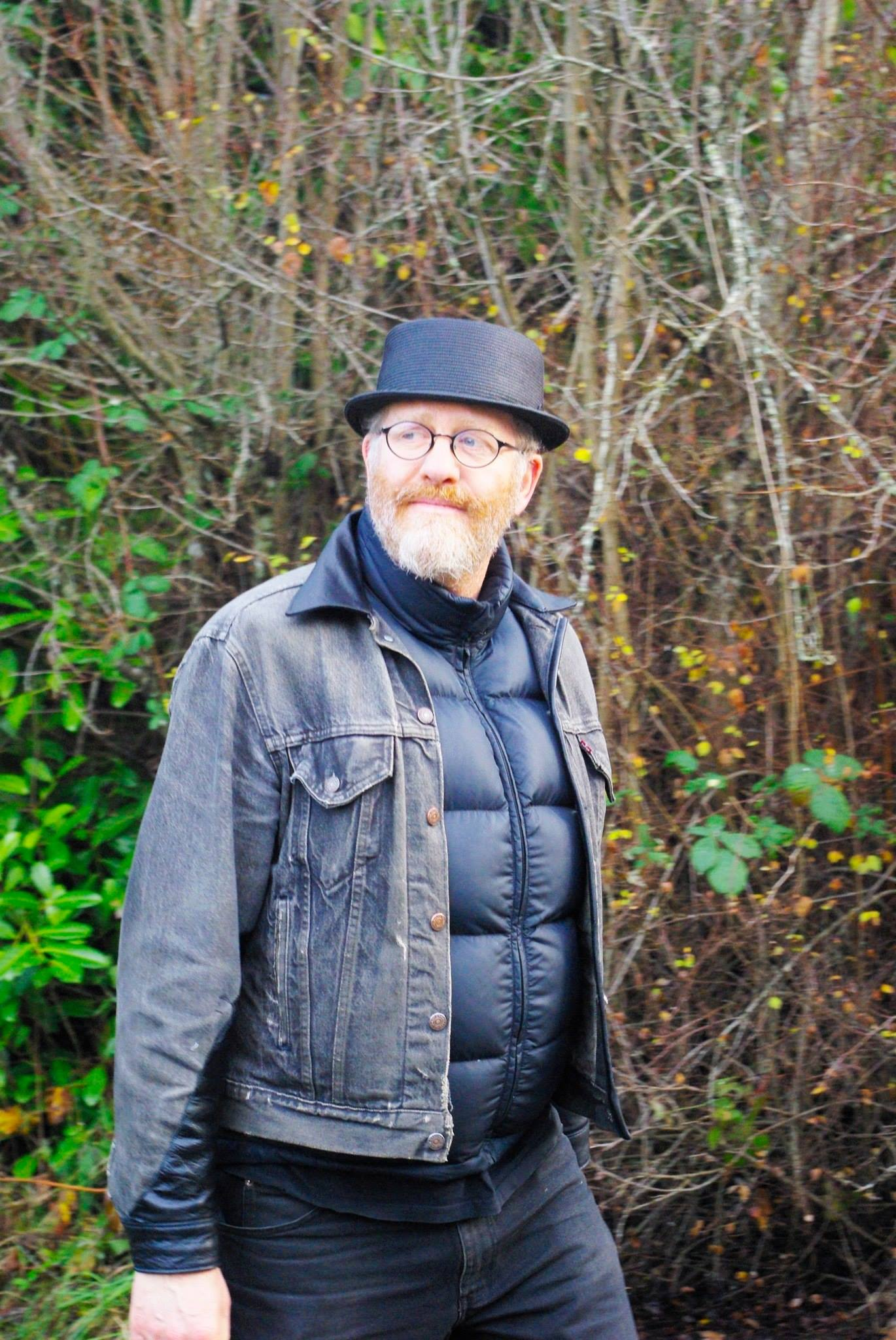
Andrew Gow

Andrew Colin Gow is a Canadian historian of medieval and early modern Europe and a noted scholar of early modern witchcraft. He completed his Ph.D. with the Reformation scholar Heiko Oberman. He has served as the Editor-in-Chief of Brill Publishers' book series Studies in Medieval and Reformation Traditions from 2000-2020 and was succeeded by Christopher Ocker in June 2020.

In 2021, a former student of Gow's initiated a lawsuit against him and the University of Alberta, claiming that Gow had sexually assaulted them in 2006, as well as other students, and that the University had willfully ignored his behavior. Gow and the University have denied the allegations. The suit was settled in 2023 pursuant to a Consent Dismissal Order.

== Work ==
Gow's early work focused on the Red Jews and the German tales of the apocalyptic threat they supposedly presented. His first book The Red Jews: Antisemitism in an Apocalyptic Age, 1200-1600 was published in 1995 by Brill. His later published work focused on early modern witchcraft. Gow co-wrote Male witches in early modern Europe with Lara Apps. This book critiques historians' assumptions about gender in early modern witch hunts.

Gow and his research team have been studying and translating an early modern treatise on witch hunting by Johannes Tinctor, Invectives Against the Sect of Waldensians. This book discusses the origin of many of our contemporary ideas about witchcraft, including flying on brooms and casting spells. This project was featured in an episode of CBC Radio's Ideas (radio show). Newspaper articles were written on this project including in the Toronto Star and the Edmonton Journal. Gow and his co-researchers have translated and edited a volume titled The Arras Witch Treatises: Johann Tinctor's Invectives contre la secte de vauderie and the Recollectio casus, status et condicionis Valdensium ydolatrarum by the Anonymous of Arras (1460), co-introduced, co-edited and co-translated with Robert Desjardins and François Pageau, which was published in 2016 by Penn State University Press in the series 'Magic in History'.

== Other work ==
Gow has published in many historical fields. He has written on the history of cartography, German vernacular bibles and the Apocalypse. He also co-edited a collection of writing about the Rocky Mountains: Mountain Masculinity: The Life and Writing of Nello "Tex" Vernon-Wood in the Canadian Rockies, 1906-1938.

== Recognition ==
- 2002- Alexander von Humboldt Foundation Research Fellow
- 2003 Martha Cook Piper Research Prize.
- 2008 Mercator Visiting Professorship in Medieval History, Deutsche Forschungsgemeinschaft, University of Augsburg
- 2016 Lansdowne Lecturer, University of Victoria

== Select bibliography ==
- "The" Red Jews: Antisemitism in the Apocalyptic Age 1200 - 1600. BRILL. 1995. ISBN 90-04-10255-8.
- Apps, Lara; Gow, Andrew (2 May 2003). Male Witches in Early Modern Europe. Manchester University Press. ISBN 978-0-7190-5709-0.
- Wood, Tex; Rak, Julie; Gow, Andrew Colin, eds. (2008). Mountain Masculinity: The Life and Writing of Nello "Tex" Vernon-Wood in the Canadian Rockies, 1906-1938. Athabasca University Press. ISBN 978-1-897425-02-2.
- Gow, Andrew Colin; Robert B. Desjardins, and François V. Pageau., eds. (2016) The Arras Witch Treatises: Johannes Tinctor's Invectives contre la secte de vauderie and the Recollectio casus, status et condicionis Valdensium ydolatrarum by the Anonymous of Arras (1460). Penn State University Press ISBN 978-0-271-07128-2
