= Edward Foley (priest) =

Catholic Priest, educator and author

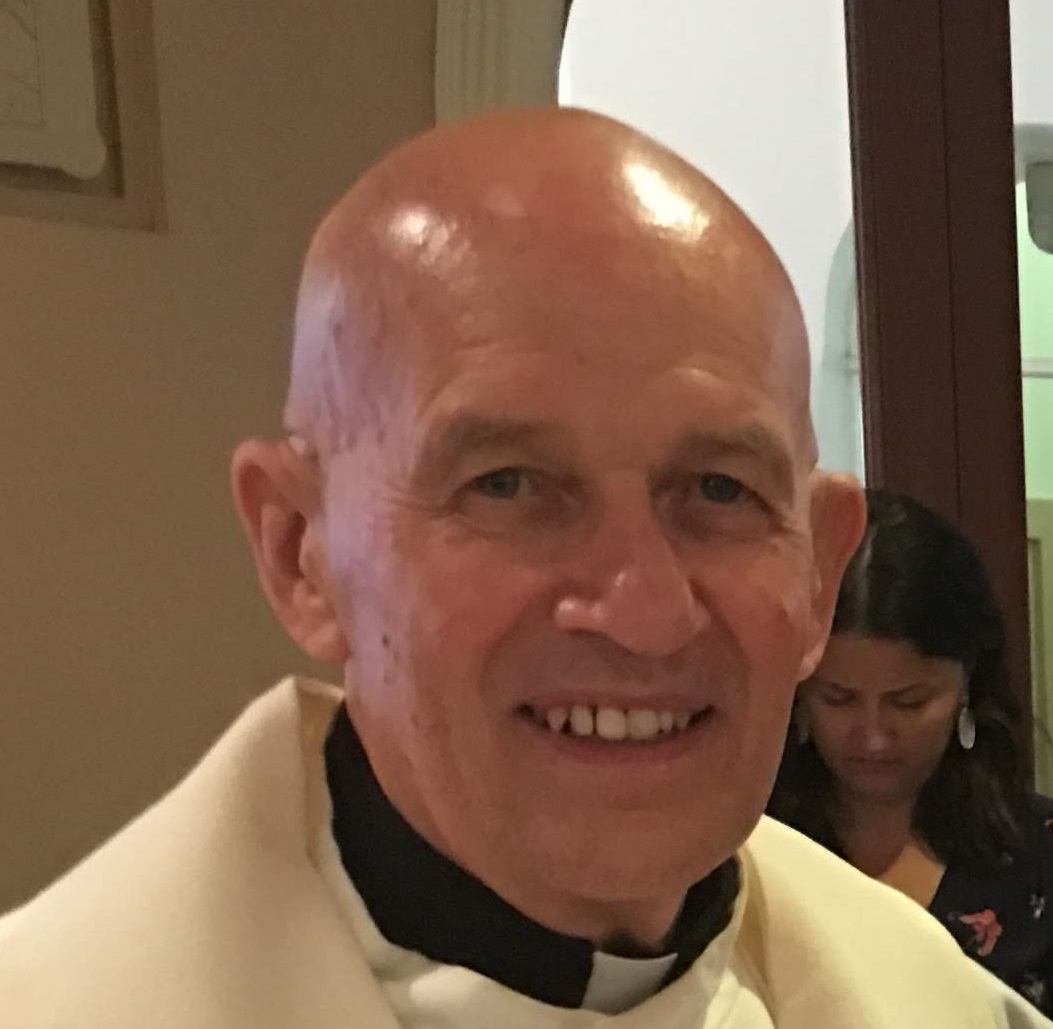
Fr Edward Foley, OFM Cap.

Edward Bernard Foley, OFM Cap. (born 16 October 1948) is a Catholic priest, educator, preacher, theologian and author, and a member of the Capuchin Franciscan Order. He is also the Duns Scotus Professor Emeritus of Spirituality and Professor of Liturgy and Music at Catholic Theological Union, where he was the founding director of the Ecumenical Doctor of Ministry Program.

== Early life and education ==
Foley was born on 16 October 1948 in Gary, Indiana. He attended high school at St. Lawrence Seminary in Mt. Calvary, Wisconsin. Joining the Capuchins in 1966, he completed undergraduate studies in Music Education and Philosophy at St. Joseph's College in Rensselaer, Indiana, and the Capuchin Seminary of St. Mary in Crown Point, Indiana (1971). He completed an M.Div. at St. Francis School of Pastoral Ministry in Milwaukee (1975), and an M.Mus. in choral conducting at the University of Wisconsin Milwaukee (1975), while an organ student of Theophane Hytrek FAGO. He completed an M.A. in liturgical research (1980), an M.A. in course (1983) and the Ph.D. in Theology at the University of Notre Dame (1987).

== Career ==
Foley was Campus Minister at the College of St. Catherine in St. Paul, Minnesota (1975–1980), then on the faculty of Catholic Theological Union in Chicago (1984–2020). Adjunct appointments include Seattle University, University of St. Thomas (St. Paul, MN), St. Paul School of Theology (Brisbane), Notre Dame University and the University of Chicago. Music critic for The National Catholic Reporter (1978–83), he was external examiner at the University of Limerick (2005–11, 2015). President of the North American Academy of Liturgy, a founding director of the Catholic Academy of Liturgy, he was on the executive committee of the International Academy of Practical Theology. In 2022 he was the Marten fellow in preaching at the University of Notre Dame. Foley is a regular preacher at Old St. Patrick's Church in Chicago (2008–). He is the vice-postulator for the canonization cause of Blessed Solanus Casey.

== Books ==
- Comprehensive Index of Writings of Blessed Solanus Casey. Province of St. Joseph, 2023. Online at https://www.solanuscasey.org/about-blessed-solanus-casey/index-of-writings/
- Adoration after Vatican II. Collegeville: The Liturgical Press. ISBN 9780814644690.
- Preaching as Paying Attention: Theological Reflection in the Pulpit. Chicago: Liturgy Training Publications, 2021. ISBN 9781616716370.
- Music: Its Theologies and Spiritualities - a global perspective. Basel: MDPI, 2020. ISBN 9783039435937.
- Defragmenting Franciscanism: Collaboration in a post Ite Vos era. Chicago: Catholic Theological Union, 2019. ISBN 9780963665997.
- Catholic Marriage: A Pastoral-Liturgical Handbook. Chicago: Liturgy Training Publications. 2019. ISBN 9781616715076.
- Practicing Ubuntu: Practical Theological Perspectives on Injustice, Personhood and human dignity. With Jaco Dreyer, Malan Nel and Yolanda Dreyer. Berlin: LIT Verlag, 2017. ISBN 9783643908483.
- Integrating Work in Theological Education. With Kathleen Cahalan and Gordon Mikoski. Eugene OR: Wipf and Stock, 2017. ISBN 9781498278799.
- A Handbook for Catholic Preaching. Collegeville: Liturgical Press, 2016. ISBN 9780814663165.
- Music and Spirituality. Basel, Switzerland: MDPI AG, 2015. ISBN 9783038421023.
- Theological Reflection Across Faith Traditions: The Turn to Reflective Believing. Rowman & Littlefield, 2015. ISBN 9781442247192.
- A Commentary on the Order of Mass of The Roman Missal: A new English Translation. General Editor. Collegeville: The Liturgical Press, 2011. ISBN 9780814662472.
- Religion, Diversity and Conflict. General Editor. International Practical Theology, Vol. 8. Berlin: LIT Verlag, 2011. ISBN 9783643900869.
- A Lyrical Vision: US Bishops' Documents on Music. Collegeville: The Liturgical Press, 2009. ISBN 9780814632796.
- From Age to Age. Revised and enlarged. Collegeville: The Liturgical Press, 2008. ISBN 9780814630785.
- 예배와 목회상담 힘 있는 이야기, 위험한 의례. Seoul: Christian Literature Center, 2017. ISBN 9788934117162.
- Hagan esto en Conmemoración Mía. Mexico City: Obra Nacional de la Buena Prensa, A.C., 2010. ISBN 9780814643129.
- Commentary on the General Instruction of the Roman Missal. General Editor. Collegeville: Liturgical Press, 2007. ISBN 9780814660171.
- Journey to Holiness: A Pilgrimage through the Solanus Casey Center. Detroit: MarkWest, 2007. ISBN 9780979439407.
- The Wisdom of Creation. with Robert Schreiter. Collegeville: The Liturgical Press 2004. ISBN 9780814651223.
- Mutuality Matters: Family, Faith and Justice. With Herbert Anderson, Bonnie Miller McLemore and Robert Schreiter. Lanham MD: Rowman & Littlefield, 2003. ISBN 9780742531550.
- Worship Music: A Concise Dictionary. General Editor. Collegeville: The Liturgical Press, 2000. ISBN 9780814658895.
- Preaching Basics. Chicago: Liturgy Training Publications, 1998. ISBN 9781568541709.
- Mighty Stories, Dangerous Rituals: The Intersection of Worship and Pastoral Care. With Herbert Anderson. Minneapolis: Fortress Press, 2019. ISBN 9781506454795.
- 예배와 목회상담 힘 있는 이야기, 위험한 의례. Seoul: Hakjisa Publisher, 2012. ISBN 9788963309484.
- Ritual Music: Essays in Liturgical Musicology. Washington DC: The Pastoral Press, 1995. ISBN 9781569290576.
- Así Es: Stories of Hispanic Spirituality. With Arturo Perez and Consuelo Covarrubias. Collegeville: The Liturgical Press, 1994. ISBN 9780814622902.
- Así es Historias de Espiritualidad Hispana. With Arturo Perez and Consuelo Covarrubias. Collegeville: The Liturgical Press, 1994. ISBN 9780814622919.
- Developmental Disabilities and Sacramental Access: New Paradigms for Sacramental Encounters. Collegeville: The Liturgical Press, 1994. ISBN 9780814622803.
- Foundations of Christian Music: The Music of Pre-Constantinian Christianity. GROW/Alcuin Publications. Nottingham, England, 1992. ISBN 1851742182; Revised edition. Collegeville: The Liturgical Press, 1996. ISBN 9780814623961.
- The Milwaukee Symposia for Church Composers: A Ten-Year Report. Chicago: Liturgy Training Publications, 1992. ISBN 9780912405438.
- From Age to Age: How Christians Celebrated the Eucharist. Chicago: Liturgy Training Publications, 1991. ISBN 9780929650418.
- 時代から時代へ―礼拝、音楽、建築でたどるキリスト教の変遷. Tokyo: Sei ko kai Shuppan, 2004. ISBN 488274144X.
- The First Ordinary of the Royal Abbey of St.-Denis in France (Paris, Bibliothèque Mazarine 526). Fribourg: The University Press, 1990. ISBN 9782827104871.
- Rites of Religious Profession. Chicago: Liturgy Training Publications, 1989. ISBN 9780929650012.
- Music and the Eucharistic Prayer. With Mary McGann. Washington, DC: The Pastoral Press, 1988. ISBN 9780814619346.
- Music in Ritual: A Pre-Theological Investigation. Washington, DC: The Pastoral Press, 1984. ISBN 9780912405094.

== Honors and grants ==
- 2023, Preaching and Neuroscience grant, Lilly Endowment.
- 2023, 2022, 2017, 2009, 2008 (x 3), 2005, 1994. Catholic Press Association, publishing awards.
- 2023, Yves Congar Award, Barry University.
- 2022, Marten Faculty Fellowship, University of Notre Dame.
- 2022, Great Preachers Award, Aquinas Institute.
- 2021, Frederick R. McManus Award, Federation of Diocesan Liturgical Commissions.
- 2020–2023, Preaching with the Sciences grant, John Templeton Foundation.
- 2018, Citizen Service Award, University of Chicago – Department of Safety and Security.
- 2016, Videographer Award for Encountering the Mystery: An Overview of Eucharistic Theology.
- 2013, Berakah Award, North American Academy of Liturgy.
- 2012, Lilly Faculty Sabbatical grant.
- 2003. Jubilate Deo Award, National Association of Pastoral Musicians.
- 1997, Lawrence F. Heiman Award, St. Joseph's College.
