= Kenneth G. Hagen =

American theologian (1936–2014)

Kenneth George Hagen (July 2, 1936 - May 11, 2014) was an American theologian who specialized in the Protestant Reformation and the thought of Martin Luther.

Hagen was born July 2, 1936 in Minneapolis, Minnesota. He earned a B.A. at Augsburg College in 1958, a B.D. from Harvard Divinity School in 1961, and a Th.D. from Harvard University (where he was a student of Heiko Oberman) in 1967. He taught in the Theology Department of Marquette University for 33 years.
