= John Tilson (cricketer) =

English cricketer

Personal information
- Born: 27 March 1845; Ilkeston, Derbyshire, England
- Died: 4 November 1895 (aged 50); Ilkeston, Derbyshire, England
- Batting: Right-handed
- Bowling: Right-arm medium

Domestic team information
- Years: Team
- 1871–1876: Derbyshire
- FC debut: 26 May 1871 Derbyshire v Lancashire
- Last FC: 1 June 1876 Derbyshire v Lancashire

Career statistics
Competition	First-class
Matches	3
Runs scored	26
Batting average	5.20
100s/50s	0/0
Top score	14
Catches/stumpings	0/–
- Source: CricketArchive, 16 December 2010

John Tilson (27 March 1845 – 4 November 1895) was an English cricketer who played for Derbyshire between 1871 and 1876. He was a member of the team that played Derbyshire's first match in May 1871.

Tilson was born in Ilkeston, Derbyshire and was by occupation a lace maker. He played for Derbyshire in 1871 in their first match as a club. This was in May against Lancashire and ended in an innings victory for Derbyshire. He played against Lancashire again in the 1872 season. His next and last match was in the 1876 season.

Tilson was a right-handed batsman and played five innings in three first-class matches with a top score of 14 and an average of 5.20. He was a right-arm round-arm medium pace bowler but did not bowl for the county.

Tilson died in Ilkeston, Derbyshire at the age of fifty. He was found dead of exposure under a pavilion.
