= Zachary Hayes =

American Franciscan theologian (1932–2014)

The Reverend Zachary Hayes OFM
- Born: September 21, 1932; Chicago, Illinois, U.S.
- Died: March 16, 2014 (aged 81); Manitowoc, Wisconsin, U.S.

Academic work
- Discipline: Theology
- Sub-discipline: Systematic theology
- Institutions: Catholic Theological Union
- Notable works: Bonaventure: Mystical Writings (1999)

Zachary J. Hayes OFM (September 21, 1932 – March 16, 2014) was an American Franciscan priest, theologian and Bonaventure scholar.

== Biography ==
Born in Chicago, Hayes completed a BA in philosophy in 1956 from Quincy University and a ThD in 1964 from the University of Bonn in Germany. While there, one of his professors was Joseph Ratzinger, the future Pope Benedict XVI; Hayes was later the first to translate Ratzinger's habilitation into English.

In 1974, he was appointed Full Professor of systematic theology at the Catholic Theological Union where he taught for 37 years, beginning as one of the founding professors in 1968.

He published 16 books and 55 articles. A festschrift was prepared in his honor, entitled That Others May Know and Love and published in 1997.

Hayes died on March 16, 2014, at the age of 81.
