= Steven P. Millies =

American Catholic theologian

- Born: November 29, 1972 (age 53); Libertyville, Illinois, U.S.
- Occupation: Catholic theologian

Academic background
- Education: Loyola University Chicago (B.A.), 1994; Catholic University of America (M.A.), 1997; Catholic University of America (Ph.D.), 2003

Steven P. Millies (born November 29, 1972) is an author, political theorist, and professor of public theology and director of The Bernardin Center at Catholic Theological Union in Chicago, IL. Before joining CTU in 2017, Millies held the Strom Thurmond Endowed Chair in Political Science at the University of South Carolina Aiken (Aiken, SC) where he taught from 2003-2017.

== Education ==
Born and raised in the Chicago area, Millies studied history at Loyola University Chicago while also pursuing minor sequences in political science and philosophy. He earned an M.A. and Ph.D. in political theory at The Catholic University of America where he studied under David Walsh. His dissertation, "A Relation between Us": Religion and the Political Thought of Edmund Burke, examined how Burke hoped religion could supplement and ground the authority of law in a modern, constitutional state in circumstances with and without the formal support of a religious establishment.

== Work ==
Millies's academic work focused on the relationships between history, religion, and politics, especially as they intersect in the Roman Catholic tradition. Examining writers in both the liberal and conservative political traditions, Millies had been interested in the ways that historical understanding shapes the encounters between religious belief and the politics of pluralism. He had written widely, drawing from authors along the full spectrum including Eric Voegelin and Edmund Burke, Thomas Merton and Joseph Bernardin. Millies became involved in controversy in 2020 when U.S. Catholic magazine unpublished an article he had written that was critical of New York Cardinal Timothy Dolan. The article later was re-published in full by the National Catholic Reporter.

== Awards and recognitions ==
Millies's 2016 biography of Joseph Bernardin was a finalist in the biography category for the 2017 Association of Catholic Publishers' Excellence in Publishing Awards. The same book was awarded first place for the biography category by the Catholic Press Association's 2017 book awards. Millies was named the 2020 Pierre Teilhard de Chardin, SJ Visiting Fellow in Catholic Studies at Loyola University Chicago's Hank Center for the Catholic Intellectual Heritage.

== Works ==
- Joseph Bernardin: Seeking Common Ground (Collegeville, MN: Liturgical Press, 2016) ISBN 978-0-8146-4831-5
- Good Intentions: A History of Catholic Voters' Road from Roe to Trump. (Collegeville, MN: Liturgical Press Academic, 2018) ISBN 978-0-8146-4467-6
- A Consistent Ethic of Life: Navigating Catholic Engagement with U.S. Politics. (Mahwah, NJ: Paulist Press, 2024). ISBN 978-08091-5689-4
