= Edward Foley (cricketer) =

English cricketer

Personal information
- Full name: Edward Francis Walwyn Foley
- Born: 6 October 1851; Derby, England
- Died: 23 October 1923 (aged 72); Kensington, England
- Batting: Right-handed

Domestic team information
- Years: Team
- 1871: Derbyshire
- Only FC: 17 August 1871 Derbyshire v Lancashire

Career statistics
| Competition | First-class |
|---|---|
| Matches | 1 |
| Runs scored | 0 |
| Batting average | 0 |
| 100s/50s | 0/0 |
| Top score | 0 |
| Catches/stumpings | 1/0 |
- Source: CricketArchive, 16 December 2010

Edward Francis Walwyn Foley (6 October 1851 – 23 October 1923) was an English cricketer who played for Derbyshire in 1871.

Foley was born in Derby, the son of Rev. Edward Walwyn Foley, who was vicar of All Saints Derby from 1848 to 1872. He was educated at Repton School and admitted at Wadham College, Oxford in 1870. He was the youngest member of the Derbyshire team during their inaugural 1871 season.

Foley participated in the second match ever played by Derbyshire, against Lancashire in the 1871 season. He was a right-handed batsman. He failed to score a run during the match, though he made one catch in the outfield.

Foley died at the age of 72 in Kensington.
