= Heiko Oberman =

Dutch historian and theologian (1930–2001)

- Born: Heiko Augustinus Oberman; 15 October 1930; Utrecht, Netherlands
- Died: 22 April 2001 (aged 70); Tucson, Arizona, U.S.
- Spouse: Geertruida Reesink (m. 1956)
- Awards: Heineken Prize (1996)

Academic background
- Education: Utrecht University
- Thesis: Archbishop Thomas Bradwardine, A Fourteenth Century Augustinian (1957)

Academic work
- Discipline: History; theology
- Sub-discipline: Ecclesiastical history; historical theology; late medieval history
- Institutions: Harvard University; University of Tübingen; University of Arizona
- Doctoral students: Andrew Gow; David Steinmetz
- Notable students: Brad S. Gregory
- Main interests: Reformation
- Notable works: The Harvest of Medieval Theology (1963); Luther (1989)

Heiko Augustinus Oberman (1930 – 2001) was a Dutch historian and theologian who specialized in the study of the Reformation.

== Life ==
Oberman was born in Utrecht on 15 October 1930. He earned his doctorate in theology from the University of Utrecht in 1957 and joined the faculty of the Harvard Divinity School in 1958. There he rose rapidly from instructor to associate professor and, in 1963, to professor of church history. He was appointed Winn Professor of Ecclesiastical History at Harvard Divinity School in 1964 and continued teaching there until 1966. He then accepted a chair in the theology faculty at the University of Tübingen, Germany, where he also became director of the Institute for Late Middle Ages and Reformation Research. Later in life, Oberman founded the Division for Late Medieval and Reformation Studies at the University of Arizona. His major books include The Harvest of Medieval Theology: Gabriel Biel and Late Medieval Nominalism (1963), which articulated his program of bridging the gap between the later Middle Ages and Reformation era (at least in the field of theology), and an iconoclastic biography of Martin Luther, translated from German as Luther: Man Between God and the Devil (1989). About Luther, Oberman wrote: "There is no way to grasp Luther's milieu of experience and faith unless one has an acute sense of his view of Christian existence between God and the Devil: without a recognition of Satan's power, belief in Christ is reduced to an idea about Christ – and Luther's faith becomes a confused delusion in keeping with the tenor of his time." He died on 22 April 2001.

== Honors ==
Numerous honorary degrees and affiliations in the United States and abroad pay homage to Oberman's stature as a scholar and an educator. He became member of the Royal Netherlands Academy of Arts and Sciences in 1963, a member of the American Academy of Arts and Sciences in 1964, and a member of the American Philosophical Society in 1991. In 1996, the Royal Netherlands Academy of Arts and Sciences awarded him the prestigious Dr A.H. Heineken Prize for History – the highest honor a historian can receive – and, in 2001, shortly before his death, he was told that he would be awarded a knighthood by Queen Beatrix of the Netherlands in 2002 for extraordinary representation of Dutch scholarship and culture. At the University of Arizona, he was named Regents' Professor of History in 1988 and was honored with the 5-Star Faculty Teaching Award in 1989, the College of Social and Behavioral Sciences Teaching Award for Graduate Instruction in 1999, and the SBS Board of Advisors Lifetime Achievement Award in 2001.

== Bibliography ==
Monographs

- Archbishop Thomas Bradwardine, a Fourteenth Century Augustinian: A Study of His Theology in Its Historical Context (Utrecht: Kemink & Zoon, 1957)
- The Harvest of Medieval Theology: Gabriel Biel and Late Medieval Nominalism (Cambridge, Mass: Harvard University Press, 1963); reprint (Grand Rapids, MI: Baker Academic, 2001)
- The Virgin Mary in Evangelical Perspective (Philadelphia: Fortress Press, 1971)
- Contra Vanam Curiositatem: Ein Kapitel der Theologie zwischen Seelenwinkel und Weltall (Zürich: Theologischer Verlag, 1974)
- Werden und Wertung der Reformation: vom Wegestreit zum Glaubenskampf (Tübingen : J.C.B. Mohr, 1977); English translation: Masters of the Reformation: The Emergence of a New Intellectual Climate in Europe, translated by Dennis Martin (New York: Cambridge University Press, 1981)
- Wurzeln des Antisemitismus. Christenangst und Judenplage im Zeitalter von Humanismus und Reformation, Berlin: Severin und Siedler, 1981); English translation: The Roots of Anti-Semitism in the Age of Renaissance and Reformation, translated by James I. Porter (Philadelphia: Fortress Press, 1984)
- Luther – Mensch zwischen Gott und Teufel (Berlin: Severin und Siedler, 1981); English translation: Luther – Man between God and the Devil, translated by Eileen Walliser-Schwartzbart (London: HarperCollins, 1993)
- De Erfenis van Calvijn: Grootheid en Grenzen (Kampen: Kok, 1988)
- John Calvin and the Reformation of the Refugees, edited by Peter Dykema (Geneva: Librairie Droz, 2009)

Collected essays

- Dawn of the Reformation: Essays in Late Medieval and Early Reformation Thought (Edinburgh: T. & T. Clark, 1986)
- The Reformation: Roots and Ramifications, translated by Andrew Colin Gow (Edinburgh: T. & T. Clark, 1993)
- The Impact of the Reformation: Essays (Grand Rapids, MI: William B. Eerdmans, 1994)
- The Two Reformations: The Journey from the Last Days to the New World, edited by Donald Weinstein (New Haven: Yale University Press, 2003)
- Zwei Reformationen: Luther und Calvin—alte und neue Welt. edited by Manfred Schulze (Berlin: Siedler, 2003) Review in H-Soz-u-Kult (German)

Edited sources

- H.A. Oberman, ed. Forerunners of the Reformation: The Shape of Late Medieval Thought (New York: Holt, Rinehart and Winston, 1966); reprint (Philadelphia : Fortress Press, 1981.
- Gabriel Biel, Defensorium Obedientiae Apostolicae Et Alia Documenta, ed. and trans. Heiko Augustinus Oberman, Daniel E. Zerfoss, and William J. Courtenay (Cambridge: Belknap Press of Harvard University Press, 1968)

Festschrifts

- Kenneth Hagen, ed. Augustine, The Harvest, and Theology (1300–1650): Essays Dedicated to Heiko Augustinus Oberman in Honor of His Sixtieth Birthday (Leiden: Brill, 1990)
- Robert James Bast and Andrew Colin Gow, eds. Continuity and Change: The Harvest of Late Medieval and Reformation History: Essays Presented to Heiko A. Oberman on His 70th Birthday (Leiden: Brill, 2000)

== See also ==
- Richard Marius
