= Stephanie Paulsell =

American theologian

Stephanie Paulsell is an American theologian, currently the Susan Shallcross Swartz Professor of the Practice of Christian Studies at Harvard Divinity School.

== Works ==
- The Scope of Our Art: The Vocation of the Theological Teacher (Wm. B. Eerdmans, 2001) ISBN 9780802849588
- Honoring the Body: Meditations on a Christian Practice (Jossey-Bass, 2003) ISBN 9780787948566
- Lamentations and the Song of Songs: A Theological Commentary on the Bible (Westminster John Knox Press, 2012) ISBN 9780664233020
- Religion Around Virginia Woolf (Penn State University Press, 2019) ISBN 9780271084886
