= Andrew Preston Peabody =

American clergyman and author

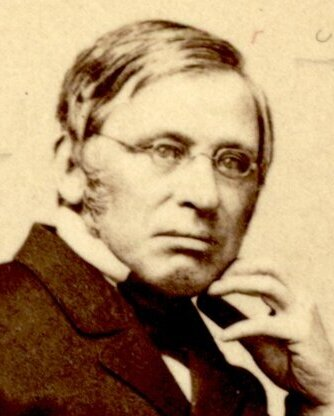
- Born: March 19, 1811; Beverly, Massachusetts
- Died: March 10, 1893 (aged 81); Boston, Massachusetts
- Resting place: Portsmouth, New Hampshire
- Education: Harvard University

Andrew Preston Peabody (March 19, 1811 – March 10, 1893) was an American clergyman and author.

== Life ==
Born in Beverly, Massachusetts, Peabody was descended from Lieut. Francis Peabody of St. Albans, who emigrated to Massachusetts in 1635. He learned to read before he was three years old, entered Harvard College at the age of twelve, and graduated in 1826, the youngest graduate of Harvard with the single exception of Paul Dudley (class of 1690).

In 1833 Peabody became assistant pastor of the South Parish (Unitarian) of Portsmouth, New Hampshire; the senior pastor died before Peabody had been preaching a month, and he succeeded to the charge of the church, which he held until 1860. In 1853 to 1863 he was proprietor and editor of the North American Review. He was elected a member of the American Antiquarian Society in 1856. From 1843 to 1885 he served as a trustee of Phillips Exeter Academy.

Peabody was preacher to Harvard University and the Plummer professor of Christian morals from 1860 to 1881, and was professor emeritus from 1881 until his death in Boston, Massachusetts, shortly before his 82nd birthday.

A bronze tablet dedicated to his memory is found in Appleton Chapel, Cambridge, Massachusetts (see the Memoir by Edward J. Young, Cambridge, 1896). The inscription on the tablet concludes with: "He moved among the teachers and students of Harvard College, and wist not that his face shone."

Andrew Peabody was an accomplished scholar, and also a firm believer in ethical behavior. He championed many causes during his life, including peace, the end of slavery, the education of women, and better treatment for the mentally ill. The Peabody School in Cambridge, Massachusetts was founded in 1889. The original building was three stories high and cost $25,000. That building was razed, and a new one built in 1962 at a cost of $1,420,000. In 2003, the Peabody School was relocated to its current facility, which received extensive renovations and additions in 2001. The Peabody School today continues to represent the two things for which Andrew Peabody is remembered: the pursuit of academic excellence, coupled with a caring and respect for others.

== Published works ==
In addition to brief memoirs and articles, Peabody wrote:

- Christianity the Religion of Nature (2 vol. ed., 1864)
- Lowell Institute Lectures; Reminiscences of European Travel (1868)
- A Manual of Moral Philosophy (1873)
- Christian Belief and Life (1875)
- Harvard Reminiscences (1888).
