= Macroethics and microethics =

Type of applied ethics

Macroethics (from the Greek prefix "makros-" meaning "large" and "ethos" meaning character) is a term coined in the late 20th century to distinguish large-scale ethics from individual ethics, or microethics. It is a type of applied ethics. Macroethics deals with large-scale issues, often in relation to ethical principles or normative rules to guide action.

Microethics is a term introduced by Paul Komesaroff in 1995 and elaborated in a series of subsequent works. The concept, which draws especially on the work of the philosophers Edmund Husserl and Emmanuel Levinas, is based on the recognition that most ethical decisions in everyday life are not taken on the basis of explicit rational argument or calculation but rather occur in a continuous flux of relationships and dialogues. Often the processes of microethical judgments are intuitive and may even go unrecognised at the time. It is the accumulation of infinitesimal microethical moments that composes the large-scale ethical landscapes in which we live.

Macroethics tends to emphasise principles, universal claims and normative rules, while microethics is context-specific and local, and acknowledges the role of modalities of communication and decision-making that go beyond rational argumentation. Macroethics and microethics are complementary and coexist in most ethical settings. Komesaroff has elaborated the dynamics of microethical decision-making in a variety of practical, often intimate, contexts.

If a researcher only acts within the bounds of one's research, i.e. exclusively microethical, the research may still be unacceptable from a societal perspective if it violates macroethical principles. Conversely, purely macroethical considerations are often disengaged from the concrete lifeworlds of ethical subjects and so lack coherence or relevance.

== Examples ==
For example, in the medical setting of end of life issues, the macroethical considerations may include abstract reflections on the nature of life and death and high level principles about the “sacredness” or otherwise of life, the nature of personhood and the relevance and ethical force of competing consequences. By contrast, the microethical processes relate to the internal details of the interactive engagements between the doctor and the patient, including non-linguistic and affective responses, often signified by small adjustments in facial expressions, posture, tone of voice or choice of words, and the great variety of meanings and values on which both participants call.

Ethical considerations in biomedicine, engineering and other technical professions include issues relating both to large societal problems and to particular professions and professional conduct. Pharmaceuticals present particular macroethical challenges. Drug designers seek to prevent and treat diseases by modifying of stem cells and producing targeting drugs that have specific targeting mechanisms. However, the application of drugs or other therapeutic techniques also requires specific examination of the needs of individual patients, including their health conditions, their cultural preferences, their personal values and those of their families, and economic and other considerations. The negotiation of these latter considerations occurs within the field of microethics.
