= Madeleva Wolff =

American nun, writer, and university administrator

Sister M. Madeleva Wolff, C.S.C., (May 24, 1887 – July 25, 1964), the "lady abbess of nun poets", was the third President of Saint Mary's College in Notre Dame, Indiana.

== Life ==
Sister Madeleva was born in Cumberland, Wisconsin, in 1887, and christened Mary Evaline Wolff. Her father, August Wolff, was a Lutheran and a saddle and harness maker, who was twice mayor of Cumberland. He read poetry to Mary Evaline. Madeleva's mother, Lucy, was a devout Catholic. Mary Evaline learned how to handle pliers, tacks and hammers. She climbed thorn apple trees, diagrammed wildflowers and in winter ice-skated from morning to night. At school, she "lived to learn, and so lived richly," she wrote in one of her books, My First Seventy Years.

Madeleva decided to become a religious sister during her first semester at Saint Mary's College. She was given the name "Madeleva" upon her acceptance into the Congregation of Holy Cross in 1908 and took her final vows when she finished her bachelor's degree in 1910.

Sister Madeleva was known for her poetry, her eloquence and her outspokenness. She was a medieval scholar, whose literary essays won her distinction. She wrote a good deal in defense of Geoffrey Chaucer's character "The Prioress". In all, she authored more than 20 books. She served as president of the Catholic Poetry Society of America (1942–47). She resolved to publish under her religious name and to submit her work first to secular and then to Catholic magazines. The American Mercury, Commonweal, The New Republic, The New York Times, and the Saturday Review of Literature were among the secular publishers of her work. Hallmark also used some of her verses in their Christmas and sympathy cards.

She studied at numerous universities, including the University of California, Berkeley and University of Oxford. When she completed her M.A. degree in English at The University of Notre Dame, she had been one of only four Sisters to pursue graduate work there. In 1925, she earned a doctorate in English from the University of California at Berkeley. She served as a teacher and the principal of the Academy of the Sacred Heart (opened in 1878, the school closed in 1937) in Ogden, Utah, and as President of College of Saint Mary-of-the-Wasatch in Salt Lake City. She later became the head of the English department at Saint Mary's College.

The tenure of Sister Madeleva as President of Saint Mary's College began in 1934. She told leaders that "the essence of our college is not its buildings, its endowment fund, its enrollment, or even its faculty; the essence is the teaching of truth." Some of her most tangible contributions included the establishment of the School of Sacred Theology (the first and, for more than a decade, the only institution to offer graduate degrees in theology to women and lay men), the introduction of the Department of Nursing Education, and the construction of the Moreau Center for the Arts (named for Father Basil Moreau, it was one of the first all-purpose buildings for art studies—containing both galleries and theatres—in the country). She also directed that the college begin admitting African American students in 1941. In 1958, she received an honorary degree (LLD) from Indiana University. She retired from her position as president in 1961. She died in Boston in 1964.

== Service ==
Her creation of the School of Sacred Theology at St. Mary's College in 1943 was an outgrowth of her service on a committee of the Midwest chapter of the National Catholic Educational Association, which identified a problem in that religious sisters were being assigned to teach religion at Catholic institutions across the United States but were unable to enroll in graduate theology programs. She was then appointed chair of a subcommittee to address that concern. None of the Midwest Catholic Universities (Notre Dame, Saint Louis, Marquette, Loyola, and DePaul) nor Catholic University of America were willing to admit women into their theology programs. Bishop Edwin V. O'Hara, then chair of the Episcopal Commission on the Confraternity of Christian Doctrine, encouraged her to begin such a program at St. Mary's College. It took only months for her to create the school, which began offering classes on June 19, 1943.

She also served as the Indiana director of the National Conference of Christians and Jews.

== Honors ==
In 1936, she was elected to the "Gallery of Living Catholic Authors" at Webster College in a competition the college conducted with America magazine. She received a gold medal at the 1939 World's Fair in New York for submitting the best Indiana poem. In 1959, America gave her its Campion Award, named for St. Edmund Campion and given to "a scholar or public figure for 'eminent and long-standing service in the cause of letters.'” She was awarded a number of honorary degrees, including Doctor of Letters degrees from Manhattan College in New York (1938), Mount Mary College (1940), Notre Dame University (1953), Manhattanville College of the Sacred Heart (1957), Marquette University (1959), and Creighton University (1959), as well as a Doctor of Laws degree from Indiana University (1958).

== Legacy ==
In 1984, the actress Helen Hayes donated $50,000 to St. Mary's College to endow a scholarship in the name of her late friend, Sr. Madeleva Wolff.

The Academy of the Holy Cross has a Madeleva Scholars Program. It provides a structure for students who enter during their freshman year to achieve most fully the qualities of courage compassion and scholarship.

Within St. Mary's College:

- The Madeleva Society, composed of benefactors of the college
- Madeleva Hall, a classroom building
- Sister Madeleva Poetry Society
- Madeleva Lecture Series

=== Madeleva Lecture Series ===
The lecture series honors Sister Madeleva's establishment in 1943 of a School of Sacred Theology (since closed) that provided the first opportunity in the U.S. for women to pursue graduate studies in theology. The lecture series highlights the work of women in theology. On April 29, 2009, the Feast of St. Catherine of Sienna, the 1985 - 2001 Madeleva lecturers jointly issued THE MADELEVA MANIFESTO: A Message of Hope and Courage directed at women in the church. (See External links below.)

=== Past Madeleva Lecturers ===
- Monika K. Hellwig, 1985
- Sandra M. Schneiders, IHM, 1986
- Mary Collins, OSB, 1987
- Maria Harris, 1988
- Elizabeth Dreyer, 1989
- Joan Chittister, OSB, 1990
- Dolores Leckey, 1991
- Lisa Sowle Cahill, 1992
- Elizabeth A. Johnson, CSJ, 1993
- Gail Porter Mandell, 1994
- Diana L. Hayes, 1995
- Jeanette Rodriguez, 1996
- Mary C. Boys, SNJM, 1997
- Kathleen Norris, 1998
- Denise Lardner Carmody, 1999
- Sandra M. Schneiders, IHM, 2000
- Mary Catherine Hilkert, OP, 2001
- Margaret Farley, RSM, 2002
- Sidney Callahan, 2003
- Mary Ann Hinsdale, IHM, 2004
- Past Madeleva Lecturers on the 40th Anniversary of Vatican II, 2005
- Susan A. Ross, 2006
- M. Shawn Copeland, 2007
- Barbara Fiand, SNDdeN, 2008
- Anne E. Patrick, SNJM, 2009
- Wendy M. Wright, 2010
- Kwok Pui-Lan, 2011
- Kathleen Hughes, RSCJ, 2012
- Catherine E. Clifford, 2013
- Christine Firer Hinze, 2014
- Voices of Young Catholic Women, A Panel Discussion, 2015
- Marianne Farina, CSC, 2016
- Ilia Delio, OSF, 2017
- Mercy Amba Oduyoye, 2018
- Nancy Pineda-Madrid, 2019
- Lecture Postponed, 2020
- Barbara Reid, OP, 2021
- Lecture Canceled, 2022
- Cristina L. H. Traina, 2023
- Natalia Imperatori-Lee, 2024
- Kathleen Sprows Cummings, 2025
- Tracy Sayuki Tiemeier, 2026

== Quotations ==
- "I like to go to Marshall Field's in Chicago just to see how many things there are in the world that I do not want."
- "Thinking of things to be done, hopes to be realized, persons to be helped, I say laughingly that I go to a multitude of funerals daily, burying so many deceased projects, so much of what I have had to let die and must bury without regret."
- "I wrote at least one poem a month over a period of fifteen or twenty years, every one of which I sent out at once to earn its living by publication in some magazine."

== Literary works ==
- With Marian Anderson (?) co-written with Sister Mary Pieta
- Horizons: Reflections on a Liberal Education (1981?)
- A Child Asks for a Star (1964)
- The Sister Madeleva Story (1961) co-written with Barbara C. Jencks
- Conversations with Cassandra: Who Believes in Education? (1961)
- My First Seventy Years (1959)
- 25 Poemas de la Hermana Mary Madeleva : En Versión Castellana (1959)
- The Four Last Things: Collected Poems (1959)
- American Twelfth Night, and Other Poems (1955)
- A Lost Language, and Other Essays on Chaucer (1951)
- The Education of Sister Lucy: A Symposium on Teacher Education and Teacher Training (1949)
- Collected Poems (1947)
- Saint Mary's College: Notre Dame, Holy Cross, Indiana : A Report of the President (1947)
- A Song of Bedlam Inn, and Other Poems (1946)
- Selected Poems (1945)
- Addressed to Youth (1944)
- New Things and Old, Christmas, 1941 (1941)
- Four Girls, and Other Poems (1941)
- Christmas Night 1940 (1940)
- Songs of the Rood; A Century of Verse (1940)
- Gates, and Other Poems (1938)
- Christmas Eve, and Other Poems (1938)
- Bethlehem (1938)
- A Question of Lovers, and Other Poems (1936)
- The Happy Christmas Wind, and Other Poems (1936)
- Penelope, and Other Poems (1927)
- Futility, (1926)
- Chaucer's Nuns, and Other Essays (1925)
- Pearl; A Study in Spiritual Dryness (1924)
- Knights Errant, and Other Poems (1923)
- A Plea for the Familiar Essay in College English (1918)

== Works inspired by Sister Madeleva ==
- Composer Zae Munn used Sister Madeleva's poetry as the text for a piece written for a women's choir titled "Touched to Apocalypse" (2001).
- Composer Elizabeth Poston used Sister Madeleva's poetry as text for a piece for voice and piano titled Sheepfolds. (1958)

== Bibliography ==
- Hau, Sister Mary Eva - An Analysis of the Prose and Poetry of Sister Mary Madeleva ...
- Kilmer, Kenton - Contemporary Catholic Authors : Sister M. Madeleva, C.S.C., Pioneer Poet
- Klein, Mary Ellen - Sister M. Madeleva Wolff, C.S.C., Saint Mary's College, Notre Dame, Indiana : a study of presidential leadership, 1934-1961
- Mandell, Gail Porter - Madeleva: A Biography
- Mandell, Gail Porter - Madeleva: One Woman's Life
- McDonnell, Mary E. - A Study of Sister Madeleva's Disquisition on the Pearl in Regard to the Method She Followed and the Methods Followed by Earlier and Subsequent Writers.
- Oster, Ann M. - The Poetry of Sister Mary Madeleva, C.S.C. : A Spiritual Autobiography of a Modern Medievalist
- Quinn, Sister Mary Marcelline - Sister Mary Madeleva Wolff : A Study of Her Life and Works
- Werner, Maria Assunta - Madeleva: Sister Mary Madeleva Wolff, C.S.C. : A Pictorial Biography
- Witherspoon, Marjorie Hall Walsh - Sister Madeleva: Lyric Poet
- Life Magazine, June 10, 1957 - Close-up of Sister Mary Madeleva of Saint Mary's College in South Bend, Indiana
