= Sisters of the Holy Cross =

Catholic congregation for women

- Founded: 1841; 185 years ago
- Founder: Basil Moreau
- Founded at: Sainte Croix, Le Mans, France
- Headquarters: Notre Dame, Indiana
- President: Sister Sharlet Ann Wagner, CSC
- Website: www.cscsisters.org

The Sisters of the Holy Cross are one of three Catholic congregations of religious sisters which trace their origins to the foundation of the Congregation of Holy Cross by Basil Moreau in Le Mans, France, in 1837. Members designate themselves with the post-nominals CSC.

The other two congregations of religious women in the tradition of the Holy Cross Family are the Marianites of Holy Cross (New Orleans, Louisiana) and the Sisters of Holy Cross (Montreal, Quebec, Canada). The Sisters of the Holy Cross motherhouse is located in Notre Dame, Indiana, on the campus of Saint Mary's College.

They are distinct from the Sisters of the Holy Cross Menzingen, a teaching congregation founded in Switzerland in 1844.

== Early history ==
In 1837, Basil Moreau established the Congregation of Holy Cross. The congregation took its name from the neighborhood of Sainte Croix in Le Mans, where the 12th-century church, Notre Dame du Sainte Croix, was to become the mother church of the new foundation. In 1841, Moreau founded a society of sisters within the Congregation.

In June 1843, four sisters left the mother house in France to join Edward Sorin at his mission at Notre Dame, Indiana. A second story had been added to the log chapel at the University of Notre Dame for their convent. The Sisters of the Holy Cross were founded originally to care for the housework in the boarding schools conducted by the priests. Upon their arrival, they took charge of the sacristy, infirmary, clothes room, etc. In 1844, a novitiate was opened at Bertrand, Michigan, six miles from Notre Dame. The sisters taught the children of the neighbourhood, and cared for several orphans. With assistance from the Society for the Propagation of the Faith, the sisters were able to extend their work.

A school was opened at Pokagon, Michigan, in 1845. This was followed by other foundations at St. Johns, Mackinac, Louisville, Lowell (Indiana), La Porte, Michigan City, and Mishawaka. In 1847, four sisters with some companions from the mother-house in France opened a convent at St. Laurent, Canada, which formed the nucleus of the subsequently erected province. In 1849 four sisters took charge of the boys' orphan asylum in New Orleans, and from there a house was opened in 1854 in New York with the sanction of Moreau. Sisters were sent to this establishment from Notre Dame, Canada, and New Orleans. Misunderstandings due to orders issued from France and Notre Dame led to the withdrawal of the American sisters from the new foundations, the houses of New Orleans and New York remaining subject to the French motherhouse.

The year 1856 saw the sisters well-established in Chicago and Philadelphia. They had charge of the cathedral parochial school, St. Joseph's German school, and an industrial school in Chicago, and were installed in St. Paul's and St. Augustine's schools in Philadelphia. Later they opened a select school for boarders and day-pupils in West Philadelphia. These foundations all promised success, but the strained relations between the mother-house at Le Mans under Father Moreau and the Provincial House at Notre Dame under Father Sorin led to the recall of the sisters.

In 1853, Eliza Gillespie, sister of Neal Henry Gillespie, received the habit from Sorin, and sailed for France to make her novitiate as Sister Angela. After profession, she returned to Bertrand and took charge of the academy, 1854. From that time until her death (1887), Gillespie laboured indefatigably to develop the highest intellectual and religious qualities in both teachers and students, and must be regarded as the virtual founder of the order in the United States.

On 15 August, 1855, the convent and academy were moved from Bertrand to South Bend, Indiana. Saint Mary's Academy eventually grew to become Saint Mary's College. By 1861 the sisters were operating schools and orphanages throughout the eastern half of the United States.

When Moreau visited the provinces of Canada, Louisiana, and Notre Dame in 1857, he promulgated the Decree of Separation of the sisters from the priests and brothers. In 1869, at the advice of John Luers of Fort Wayne, the Sisters of the Holy Cross in the United States separated from the motherhouse in France and formed a distinct congregation.

=== American Civil War ===
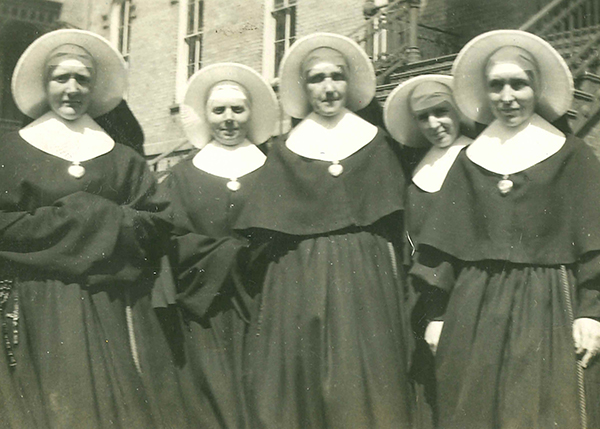
A picture of 5 nuns a part of the Sisters of the Cross congregation

Oliver P. Morton, governor of Indiana, requested the assistance of 12 sisters from the congregation. Gillespie along with five other sisters volunteered as nurses. The sisters were sent to Cairo, Illinois, where they met General Ulysses S. Grant. The sisters were then sent to the regimental headquarters of General Lew Wallace's brigade in Paducah, Kentucky. All told, some eighty sisters served as nurses, managing hospitals in Kentucky, Illinois, Tennessee, Missouri, and Washington, D.C.

Thomas Ewing, father-in-law of General William Tecumseh Sherman, was a kinsman of Gillespie; U.S. Representative James G. Blaine was her cousin. When generals failed to secure needed aid for the sick and wounded, she made trips to Washington on their behalf. Her influence in Washington was significant both because of her family connections and because of the recognition of her work for the sick and wounded soldiers. Eighty sisters nursed the wounded and ill soldiers in Illinois, Missouri, Kentucky and Tennessee. Four sisters served on the U.S. Navy's first hospital ship, the "Red Rover". They were the first female nurses to serve on board a Navy ship.

=== Post Civil War ===
Commander Charles Henry Davis of the Western Flotilla presented Gillespie with two civil war cannons, "Lady Polk" and "Lady Davis." During WWII, the cannons were melted down for scrap iron. There is a monument that stands in memory of the sisters that served in the Civil War, erected on September 20, 1924. It is located in Washington D.C., across from St Matthew's Cathedral.

Angela Gillespie returned to Notre Dame, Indiana, where her brother, Neal Henry Gillespie, was soon appointed editor of Ave Maria Magazine. Sorin put Angela Gillespie in charge of editorial management. While the Holy Cross Brothers served as typographers and pressmen, the sisters assisted in various editorial and production capacities.

=== 20th and 21st Century ===
The Sisters expanded their ministry globally with the establishment of a permanent mission in Bengal (Bangladesh) in 1927, and helping to establish an indigenous order in 1934: Associates of Mary, Queen of the Apostles. Four sisters traveled to São Paulo, Brazil, to staff a health facility and founded Colégio Santa Maria. The Sisters established a ministry in Uganda in 1967 and welcomed their first two Ugandan women to the Congregation in 1986.

Partnering with nine other Catholic religious sisters congregations, in 2023 the Sisters founded the Heritage and Research Center (HARC) at Saint Mary’s College to preserve and provide access to the archival records of their ministries. The HARC opened in 2026.

== Location ==
The Sisters of the Holy Cross are represented in the following countries:

- United States (1843)
- Bengal, India (now Bangladesh) (1853)
- Brazil (1947)
- Uganda (1967)
- Peru (1982)
- Ghana (1983)
- Mexico (1987)

== Institutions ==
- 1844: Saint Mary's College, Notre Dame, Indiana
- 1868: Academy of the Holy Cross, Kensington, Maryland
- 1869-1990: Saint Mary's Academy, Alexandria, Virginia
- 1875-1969: College of Saint Mary-of-the-Wasatch, Salt Lake City, Utah
- 1935-1973: Dunbarton College of the Holy Cross, Washington, D.C.
- 1947: Colégio Santa Maria, São Paulo, Brazil
- 1905: Holy Cross Anglo-Indian School, Tamil Nadu, India
- 1949-1971 & 1985-1992: Blessed Sacrament School, Alexandria, Virginia
- 1950: Holy Cross Girls' High School, Dhaka, Bangladesh
- 1950: Holy Cross College, Dhaka, Bangladesh
- 1952-1972: Cardinal Cushing College, Brookline, Massachusetts

== Notable members ==
- Sister Miriam Joseph, educator
- Madeleva Wolff, the "lady abbess of nun poets"

== Ministry timeline ==
- 1861-1865 Service as nurses during the American Civil War
- 1974-1997 Sisters minister in Tiberias, Israel
- 1993 Sisters open a house of spiritual study for Holy Cross sisters in India

== See also ==
- Congregation of Holy Cross
- United States Navy Nurse Corps (Civil War)
