= Cardinal Cushing College =

Private Catholic women's college in Brookline, Massachusetts, U.S. (1952-72)

Coordinates: 42.3311°N 71.1425°W

- Type: Private-Women's College
- Active: 1952–1972
- Affiliation: Catholic
- Location: Brookline, Massachusetts, United States

Cardinal Cushing College was a private, Catholic women's college in Brookline, Massachusetts, United States. It operated from 1952 to 1972 and was named after Cardinal Richard Cushing, who helped acquire the land for its campus while he was Archbishop of Boston.

Cardinal Cushing College was one of three now-defunct women's colleges sponsored by the Sisters of the Holy Cross, along with College of Saint Mary-of-the-Wasatch in Salt Lake City and Dunbarton College of Holy Cross in Washington, D.C.

After its closing, the college's campus became owned by Newbury College. Newbury College closed in 2019. Its records are held in the Sisters of the Holy Cross Archives at Saint Mary's College in Notre Dame, Indiana.
