= Madeleva Manifesto =

The Madeleva Manifesto, subtitled A Message of Hope and Courage, is a critique of the patriarchal structure of the Catholic Church. Named in honor of Holy Cross sister Madeleva Wolff, the Manifesto was first proclaimed (in English and Spanish) at St. Mary's College in Notre Dame, Indiana on April 29, 2000, as part of a weekend event entitled "Convergence 2000" scheduled in conjunction with the Roman Catholic Church's Jubilee Year and with the college's annual Madeleva lecture series. It then appeared on the college's website and in print in the National Catholic Reporter. It was written by a group of sixteen women theologians, scholars, and writers who had delivered prior Madeleva lectures and who were invited back to campus for the purpose of drafting a "Charter for Women of Faith in the New Millennium"; they came up with the Manifesto instead.

== Manifesto ==
The Manifesto is fewer than 500 words, divided into eight paragraphs.

The opening paragraph establishes that its authors were invited to speak a message of hope and courage to the women in the church, and that they do so both from their particular perspective and "in a universal vision faithful to our catholic tradition."

The second paragraph is addressed to women in ministry and theological studies. "Re-imagine what it means to be the whole body of Christ. The way things are now is not the design of God."

The third paragraph is an invitation to young women looking for models of prophetic leadership to join them in following the way of Jesus Christ. It also reports that the Spirit calls them to a "gospel feminism that respects the human dignity of all" and keeps them in the "struggle to overcome oppression of all kinds."

The fourth paragraph is addressed to women in danger of despair or indifference. "Re-imagine what it means to be a full human being made in the image of God, and to live and speak this truth in our daily lives."

The fifth paragraph expresses solidarity with "women who suffer the cost of discipleship" and expresses gratitude for the "richness of Catholic thought and spirituality" and for those who have mentored them.

The sixth paragraph pledges their willingness to stand with young women in the Church to carry forward gospel feminism, sharing what they have learned. It also requests a "commitment to far-reaching transformation of church and society in non-violent ways."

The seventh paragraph deplores anything, in any setting, that treats "women or men as less than fully human" and pledges instead to support "the heritage of biblical justice that mandates that all persons share in right relationship with each other, with the cosmos and with the Creator."

In the final paragraph, the authors resolve to "look for the holy in unexpected places and persons," and to "continue an energetic dialogue," and they extend an invitation to others "of all traditions to join us in imagining the great shalom of God."

== Background ==
The Madeleva Manifesto was developed in April 2000 when fifteen of the women who had delivered the first sixteen Madeleva Lectures for the Center for Spirituality at St. Mary's College in Notre Dame, Indiana, accepted the invitation to return to campus to draft a "Charter for Women of Faith in the New Millennium." The Madeleva Manifesto, like the Madeleva Lecture series, is named after Holy Cross sister Madeleva Wolff, who served as the third president of St. Mary's College and who founded its School of Sacred Theology, the first institution to admit women to graduate studies in theology. The lecture series was created in 1985 both to honor her contributions to the education of women and to create a forum for women's concerns in the church. The lectures are subsequently published by the Paulist Press.

The weekend retreat (April 27–30, 2000) was entitled "Convergence 2000" and was timed to coincide with the Roman Catholic Church's Jubilee Year. In addition to four private sessions for the lecturers to develop the requested document, It included several public events: the 2000 Madeleva Lecture, With Oil in Their Lamps: Faith, Feminism and the Future, delivered on the night of April 28 by Sandra M. Schneiders, I.H.M.; a Mass; and a concluding panel discussion of the document they were to deliver. Instead of a charter, these women produced The Madeleva Manifesto: A Message of Hope and Courage, which was proclaimed in English by Benedictine sister Joan Chittister and in Spanish by Jeanette Rodriguez at the concluding public session on April 29, the feast of St. Catherine of Siena, a laywoman who became a Doctor of the Church. Its signatories espoused "the conviction that 'feminism' and 'Gospel' be tightly linked, i.e. feminism is a constitutive dimension of Gospel living," and saw St. Catherine of Siena as a fitting model. The editors of America distinguished between this Gospel feminism and the caricature of "radical feminism" that they saw many using to decry any expectation that the church would fully incorporate the voice and experience of women.

Elizabeth Dreyer described the process of developing the Manifesto at some length in an article in America magazine. She notes that the group began from a conviction that "advocacy for the full humanity of women within a Christian context is a Gospel value," a point elaborated upon that weekend by Sandra Schneiders in her 2000 Madeleva Lecture. Dreyer outlines the other concerns of the group as they drafted the requested document and that "'charter' became an 'invitation' (long discussion), which became a 'manifesto' (in a flash of recognition)".

Dreyer reported that many who attended the retreat identified with Schneiders' description of Gospel feminism, which she defined as viewing Christ "as the model of one who gave his life for others without losing himself, who belonged to yet transcended his Jewish tradition, who mediated the particularity of his life and situation and the universality of his concern and who lived the tension between a radical subversion of the social, political and religious status quo and absolute refusal of violence as a means to its demise."

== Signatories ==
Although the original text of the Manifesto specified "15 Madeleva lecturers," there were actually sixteen signatories. Sr. Mary Catherine Hilkert of the University of Notre Dame participated in the weekend, signed the Manifesto, and would later deliver the 2001 Madeleva Lecture. The signatories were described in the National Catholic Reporter as "widely recognized as among the country's most distinguished theologians" and as holding "chairs at many of the top theological schools in the country and are past or current presidents of the major national theological societies and associations," and listed with identifying details about each one. America magazine observed that the caliber of the signatories should inspire readers to listen to them. U.S. Catholic described them as "a veritable who's who of Catholic feminist theology". The pdf of the Manifesto available on St. Mary's College website now specifies "16 Madeleva lecturers" from "1985 - 2001".

- Mary C. Boys, SNJM
- Lisa Sowle Cahill
- Denise Lardner Carmody
- Joan Chittister, OSB
- Mary Collins, OSB
- Elizabeth Dreyer
- Maria Harris
- Diana L. Hayes
- Monika K. Hellwig
- Mary Catherine Hilkert, OP
- Elizabeth A. Johnson, CSJ
- Dolores R. Leckey
- Gail Porter Mandell
- Kathleen Norris
- Jeanette Rodriguez
- Sandra M. Schneiders, IHM

== Response ==
It was well received by the audience at the public session in which it was presented. The editors of America described it as "by any standard a prophetic document, at once hopeful and challenging, measured and bold" and endorsed the Manifesto's request to reimagine the role of women in order to "empower all Catholics for fuller service and discipleship." Some in attendance took it back to their local area to disseminate its message. Schneiders also stated that if transmitted successfully to the next generation, this feminist vision would influence the future because it emphasized "full humanity for all persons and right relations among all creatures". It was cited by a pastoral associate, reflecting as a Catholic female Generation Xer, as confirmation that women "must be respected as leaders and given public roles in the church." One later commentator contested the Manifesto's association with Catherine of Sienna, writing for Crisis Magazine to offer a contrasting vision of St. Catherine and to criticize the Manifesto by criticizing several of the signatories for views expressed elsewhere.

== Legacy ==
The Manifesto has been described as "a milestone in the Gospel feminist movement." At the Center for Spirituality, the Manifesto "birthed, in part, the New Voices seminar and continues to inspire it," the New Voices Seminar being a gathering of young women scholars to share conversation, to learn from more senior scholars, and to create a supportive community. The interfaith scholars behind Exodus Conversations cite two paragraphs from the Manifesto as a related Christian text useful in prompting a Jewish/Christian/Muslim dialogue about how these faiths recognize women.

== Works cited ==
- Carbine, Rosemary P.; Dolphin, Kathleen (2012). Women, Wisdom, and Witness: Engaging Contexts in Conversation. Liturgical Press. ISBN 978-0-8146-8064-3.
- Marrin, Patrick (May 12, 2000). "'Coloring outside the patriarchal lines': Women theologians claim, without apology, a feminist vision". National Catholic Reporter. Vol. 36, no. 28. p. 6. ISSN 0027-8939.
