= The Bells of St. Mary's (song) =

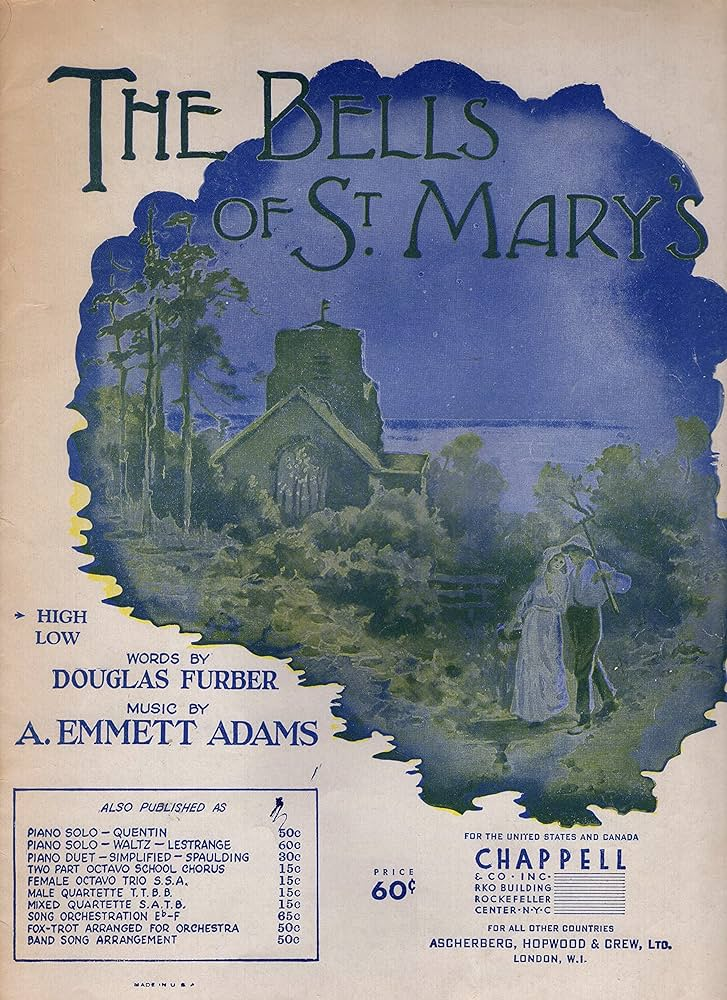
- Sheet music cover, 1917

Song
- Written: 1917
- Composer: A. Emmett Adams
- Lyricist: Douglas Furber

Audio sample
- 1921 recording by Lewis James: file; help

"The Bells of St. Mary's" is a 1917 popular song. The music was written by A. Emmett Adams, the lyrics by Douglas Furber, following a visit to St. Mary's Church, Southampton, England. It was published by the London company Ascherberg, Hopwood & Crew.

The song was revived in 1945, in the film of the same name, by Bing Crosby and Ingrid Bergman.

== Christmas connection ==
Due to the inclusion in the 1945 film of a scene featuring a Christmas pageant, both the film and the song have come to be associated with the Christmas season, although the song has no direct lyrical connection with the holiday (and, indeed, refers to the "red leaves" of autumn in the chorus). The Drifters recorded the song as the B-side of their 1954 "White Christmas" single, and several other artists have included it on Christmas albums; examples include Bob B. Soxx & the Blue Jeans (A Christmas Gift for You from Phil Spector, 1963); Andy Williams (Merry Christmas, 1965); Aaron Neville (Aaron Neville's Soulful Christmas, 1993); and Sheryl Crow (Home for Christmas, 2008).

== In popular culture ==
A bawdy parody, "The Balls of Sarn't Major", is based on the song.

The song appears in an episode of Monty Python's Flying Circus. In a skit called "Musical Mice", Ken Ewing (Terry Jones) claims to have trained mice to squeal at the specific pitches necessary to play the song (as he demonstrates with debatable success).

The Drifters' version is featured in the 1990 movie Goodfellas, in the Christmas Eve scene with Henry Hill and family, and the following scene where Stacks (Samuel L. Jackson) is shot dead by Tommy Devito (Joe Pesci).

This song is also associated with Saint Mary's College (Indiana), Saint Mary-of-the-Woods College, and Saint Mary's College of California.

A version of this song is the anthem of State University of New York Maritime College, whose first training ship was the USS St. Mary's.

This song is the anthem for the Brazilian school Colégio Santa Maria (São Paulo) that was created by American founders.

== Notable recorded versions ==
- Frances Alda (1919)
- Chet Atkins (1961) for his album Christmas with Chet Atkins and again (1974) for his album Superpickers.
- Mr. Acker Bilk (1967)
- Big Bill Bissonnette (1986)
- Bob B. Soxx & the Blue Jeans (1963) for the album A Christmas Gift for You from Phil Spector.
- Webster Booth (1947)
- David Carroll (1958)
- Maybelle Carter (1961)
- Perry Como (1962)
- Bing Crosby (1945, sung on film soundtrack. Commercial recording made on September 10, 1945, for Decca Records)
- Sheryl Crow (2008) for her album Home for Christmas.
- Vic Damone (1991)
- The Drifters (1954)
- Connie Francis (1959) for her album My Thanks to You.
- Neal Hefti and His Orchestra (1957)
- Sammy Kaye and His Orchestra (1958)
- Don Lee (1957)
- Vera Lynn (1938) and again in (1982) for her album Favourite Sacred Songs.
- Gordon MacRae (1959)
- Connie Francis included the song on her album My Thanks to You (1959).
- Jane Morgan (1961) for her album The Second Time Around.
- Aaron Neville (1993)
- Perfume Genius (2012)
- Jimmy Preston (1949)
- Reno and Smiley (1960)
- Nat Shilkret and the Victor Orchestra (1928)
- Charlie Spivak and His Orchestra (1945)
- Sister Rosetta Tharpe (1952)
- The Tokens (1965)
- Kid Thomas Valentine (1960)
- Fred Waring and His Pennsylvanians (1958)
- Andy Williams (1965) for his album Merry Christmas.
- Ruby Winters (1967)
