= Knights of the Altar =

Collection of Catholic alter boys

The Knights of the Altar is the name of a number of national organizations of serving and former altar boys in the Roman Catholic church, including the Philippines, Ireland the United States, and Canada. It traces itself back to an organization founded by Saint John Bosco.

== History ==
There is no history actually written about altar boys or use of that name during the early days of the Church, except for the word acolyte (the one who follows; a companion). It was instituted, by the Church, as a sacramental participation in the order of deacon. As preparatory steps to priesthood, an aspirant shall pass the following minor ranks of Holy Order: Tonsure, Porter, Lector, Exorcist, and Acolyte.

Acolyte, therefore, is the highest of minor Orders, and whose chief duties are to carry candles in procession, to light the candles on the altar, and to assist the priest in saying the Holy Sacrifice of the Mass (although the acolyte is not necessary for the effect of the Mass to take place; only the priest is required).

In the 9th century, at the Synod of Mainz, a decree was passed that "every priest should have a cleric or boy to read the epistle or lesson, to answer him at mass, and with whom he can chant the psalms." This is a clear indication for the substitution of altar boys for minor clerics of acolyte dating back for more than 1,000 years. Since this privilege was granted, altar boys have had an active part in divine worship. There have been hundreds of thousands of these boys whose noblest common desire is to serve, glorify, and give honor to God. One fact stands out that from among these boy servers rose some of the great and famous Church figures, like Francis Xavier, Cardinal Newman, Paschal Baylon, Martin de Porres, and Pope Pius X.

=== In modern times ===
Although John Bosco gave the name Knights of the Altar, Fr. Francis E. Benz was the first to formally organize and found the society for altar boys in 1938. Fr. Benz was a priest in the Archdiocese of Saint Paul, Minnesota, USA when Archbishop John Gregory Murray granted his approval to the organization which has these following objectives:

1.) To form a worthy guard of honor to our Divine Eucharistic King, in whose service we willingly assume the dignity and honor to become Knights of the Altar.
2.) To render faithful, reverent and edifying service to God by assisting his visible representatives, the Bishops and Priests, in offering the Holy Sacrifice of the Mass and in all other liturgical and devotional functions.
3.) To enkindle greater piety and devotion in the hearts of the faithful of the congregation whom we represent at the altar, by reverently performing the duties of our holy office and by a good example in our daily lives.
4.) To foster vocation among members.

In 1948, Ave Maria Press of the Congregation of Holy Cross assumed the sponsorship with Fr. Frank Gartland, C.S.C., Fr. Thomas McNally, C.S.C., and Bro. James Lakofka, C.S.C., who were mainly responsible for the supervision of the organization and publication of Catholic Boy Magazine, an organ established also by Fr. Benz. Charles M. Kerins was the primary Cover Artist for Catholic Boy Magazine in the 1950s and 1960s. Kerins provided classical images of a contemporary boyhood.

After the Vatican II, for some time in 1969, the magazine stopped circulation, and left a communication gap among its member units and knights. But providentially, in December 1970, Joseph DeSilvestro was designated as National Director, assisted by the Holy Cross Fathers as his advisers. From the University of Notre Dame to Marseilles, then to Ottawa, Illinois, its office is now in Lakeland, Florida. Today, it has 3,000 registered unit members throughout the world and 38 brother countries are affiliated, and more new units are being established. Restructured with regional and general advisers, Bishop Edward W. O'Rourke accepted and continued to serve as Spiritual Moderator.

An auspicious development turned up when the office move to Lakeland, Florida as the Salesian religious family of priests, brothers, and sisters and co-operators of John Bosco, and Mary Help of Christians School in Tampa, Florida backed up the organization. A member of the order has joined the Advisory Board of the Knights of the Altar.

In 1974, when K of A representatives gathered in Rome during its 35th anniversary that coincided with All Saints Day, Pope Paul VI sanctified boy servers in the Sacred Congregation to the Pontifical Work for Ecclesiastical Vocations when he said that "Mass servers as the first seminary."

In 1978, a revised K of A Handbook was published (first edition was in 1971), with a new program, revised materials, and a renewed effort to promote K of A society and to foster vocations.

In 2008, the Knights of the Altar Society, North America was established and is actively engaged in rebuilding the organization. Latin Mass Communities or Parishes where the Latin Mass is celebrated can contact the society via their website Knights of the Altar Society - North America to establish a chapter.
