= Monika Hellwig =

German-born British academic, author, educator and theologian (1929–2005)

- Born: Monika Konrad Hildegard Hellwig; 10 December 1929; Breslau, Germany
- Died: 30 September 2005 (aged 75)
- Citizenship: United Kingodom
- Children: 3 adopted children

Academic background
- Education: University of Liverpool; Catholic University of America

Academic work
- Discipline: Theology
- Sub-discipline: Dogmatic theology; Aggiornamento
- Institutions: Medical Mission Sisters; Georgetown University; Association of Catholic Colleges and Universities

Monika Konrad Hildegard Hellwig (10 December 1929 – 30 September 2005) was a German-born British academic, author, educator and theologian, who spent much of her life in the United States. A former religious sister, she left her community to pursue her academic career, becoming a professor at Georgetown University and later president and executive director of the Association of Catholic Colleges and Universities (1996–2005).

== Early life and education ==
Monika Konrad Hildegard Hellwig was born on 10 December 1929 in Breslau, Germany, to a German Catholic father and a Dutch Jewish mother, who was a noted sculptor. When the Nazis came to power, the family moved several times to avoid arrest. First the family moved to the Netherlands. Later, after the German invasion of the Netherlands, the eight-year-old Hellwig and her sisters, Marianne and Angelika, were sent to a boarding school in Scotland by their parents. Her father was later killed by the Nazi authorities. She was briefly reunited with her mother in 1946, only to see her die a few days after that reunion. That same year, aged 15, she began her higher education at the University of Liverpool, from which she received degrees in law (1949) and social science (1951).

Hellwig left England and moved to the United States in the early 1950s, where she joined the Medical Mission Sisters, a Roman Catholic religious institute of women based in Philadelphia, Pennsylvania, which had been founded to provide medical care to the poor of the world. After her novitiate, she attended Catholic University for her master's degree in theology, which she received in 1956. She returned to that university for a doctoral degree in theology (1966).

== Career ==
In 1963 Hellwig was sent to Rome, where she served as a research assistant to a Vatican official during the Second Vatican Council, one of the few women allowed unfettered access as an observer at Council sessions. Fourteen years after she took her vows, in order to better pursue her work, she requested a dispensation from her vows by the Holy See, which granted her this. Thereafter, in addition to lecturing at many universities, Hellwig taught for more than three decades at Georgetown University, including six years as the Landegger Distinguished Professor of Theology.

Hellwig wrote many books, including Understanding Catholicism (1981), Jesus, the Compassion of God (1992), The Role of the Theologian in Today’s Church (1987), Public Dimensions of a Believer’s Life: Rediscovering the Cardinal Virtues (2005), and The Eucharist and the Hunger of the World (1976). In 1985, she delivered the inaugural Madeleva Lecture at St. Mary's College, in a series that highlights the work of women in theology. In 2000, she joined fifteen other Madeleva lecturers in signing The Madeleva Manifesto: A Message of Hope and Courage. While serving as President of the Catholic Theological Society of America, in 1986 she co-signed a controversial letter in support of Charles E. Curran, a Catholic priest and professor at the Catholic University of America, who "had been stripped of his authority to teach in Catholic universities because of his dissent from the church's teachings on such issues as contraception and homosexuality." In 1996 she became president and executive director of the Association of Catholic Colleges and Universities, retaining the position until a few months before her death. She was also a senior research fellow at Georgetown's Woodstock Theological Center at the time of her death. Dolores Leckey, the 1991 Madeleva Lecturer, was a senior research fellow at the Woodstock Theological Center at the same time. Leckey (with Kathleen Dolphin) would go on to publish Monika K. Hellwig: The People's Theologian in 2010.

== Honors and legacy ==
She received 32 honorary degrees, including those from University of Portland (2000) and Lewis University (2002). In 1984, the Catholic Theological Society of America awarded her its John Courtney Murray Award, given "for a lifetime of distinguished theological achievement." She also received the Theodore M. Hesburgh, C.S.C., Award from the Association of Catholic Colleges and Universities (ACCU) in 1994. The ACCU established the Monika K. Hellwig Award for Outstanding Contributions to Catholic Intellectual Life in her honor. The College Theology Society bestows the Monika Hellwig Award for Excellence in Teaching in her honor.

== Personal life ==
Hellwig adopted two sons and a daughter, who survived her. She retained her British nationality while working and living in the United States.

== Death ==
Hellwig died on 30 September 2005, aged 75, at Washington Hospital Center from a cerebral hemorrhage. Following her death, the National Catholic Reporter referred to Hellwig's "near encyclopedic knowledge of Catholicism, which might be expected of the coauthor of the Modern Catholic Encyclopedia."

== Education ==
- University of Liverpool - law degree (1949), social science degree (1951)
- Catholic University of America - master's degree in theology (1956), doctorate (1966)
