= Dunbarton College of the Holy Cross =

Catholic women's college in Washington, D.C.

Coordinates: 38.9437°N 77.0584°W

Dunbarton College of Holy Cross was a private Catholic college for women Washington, D.C.. was one of three now-defunct women's colleges sponsored by the Sisters of the Holy Cross, along with College of Saint Mary-of-the-Wasatch in Salt Lake City and Cardinal Cushing College in Brookline, Massachusetts. Dunbarton College of Holy Cross operated from 1935 to 1973.

== History ==
Dunbarton College of Holy Cross was founded in Washington D.C. in 1935 by Mother M. Rose Elizabeth, a member of the Sisters of the Holy Cross. M. Rose Elizabeth was the college's first president. It was one of three now-defunct women's colleges sponsored by the Sisters of the Holy Cross, along with College of Saint Mary-of-the-Wasatch in Salt Lake City and Cardinal Cushing College in Brookline, Massachusetts.

The college had a chapter of Pi Gamma Mu, an honor society for the social sciences.

In 1974, Howard University purchased the campus to house the Howard University School of Law, which still occupies the campus on Van Ness Street Northwest.

== Notable people ==
=== Alumnae ===
- Cynthia Ahearn (1952–2008), echinodermologist and museum specialist
- Virginia Long (b.1942), retired New Jersey Supreme Court Associate Justice

=== Faculty ===
- Nancy Foster, chair of the biology department and former NOAA Administrator
- Elizabeth Mansfield, novelist
