= Nancy Foster =

Former director of National Ocean Service

- Born: Nancy Marie Foster; Electra, Texas
- Died: June 27, 2000 (aged 59); Baltimore, Maryland
- Other name: Nancy Foster Geraci
- Education: Texas Women's University; Texas Christian University; George Washington University
- Occupation: Oceanographer
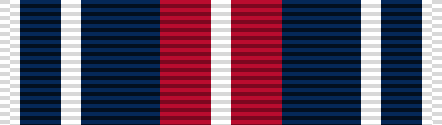
- Awards: Department of Commerce Gold Medal
- Scientific career
- Thesis: On the Spionidae (Polychaeta) of the Gulf of Mexico and Caribbean Sea (1969)

Nancy Foster Geraci (born Nancy Marie Foster; died June 27, 2000) was the director of the National Ocean Service. She is known for her work in protecting marine environments, linking conservation groups and fisherman, and expanding research in marine environments.

== Early life and education ==
Nancy Foster was born in Electra, Texas, received her undergraduate degree from Texas Woman's College, and went on to earn a master's degree in marine biology from Texas Christian University. She earned her Ph.D. in marine biology from George Washington University in 1969. A Smithsonian associate in the late 1960s while at George Washington, she conducted a portion of her dissertation research with Meredith Leam Jones and Marian H. Pettibone at the Smithsonian Institution. She wrote several papers on polychaetes at George Washington.

== Career ==
Foster worked at the United States Fish and Wildlife Service In 1969, while still associated with the Smithsonian Institution she became chair of the biology department at Dunbarton College of the Holy Cross, a position she held into the 1970s. Her students included Cynthia Ahearn.

Foster joined the National Oceanic and Atmospheric Administration (NOAA) in 1977, working in its Research and Development Office. She was the director of the Office of Protected Resources in NOAA's National Marine Fisheries Service (NMFS) from 1986 until 1993, subsequently advancing to the position of deputy assistant administrator of the NMFS by 1997. While at the NMFS, she established NOAA's Chesapeake Bay Office in Annapolis, Maryland, and NOAA's Office of Habitat Conservation.

After leaving the NMFS, Foster was the director of NOAA's National Ocean Service from 1997 until her death in 2000. As director, she led a reorganization of the NMFS and to make it into a more efficient, responsive, and scientifically rigorous agency and also created the NOAA Habitat Restoration Center and the National Marine Mammal Tissue Bank.

Foster is known for her work in the protection of fish habitats and coastal environments, and spoke to the United States Congress about research conducted in United States National Marine Sanctuaries.

Foster died of a brain tumor at her home in Baltimore, Maryland, on June 27, 2000, at the age of 59. Upon her death Senator Fritz Hollings published a tribute in the Congressional Record to honor Foster's contributions to marine science.

== Honors and awards ==
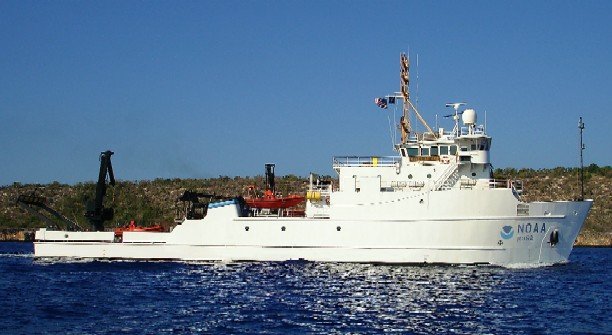
NOAAS Nancy Foster is a NOAA coastal oceanography vessel.

In 1993, Foster received a Department of Commerce Gold Medal. In 1997, Foster was the first recipient of the Dr. Nancy Foster Award for Habitat Conservation, given to her in recognition of her work in establishing the Office of Habitat Conservation.In 1999, she received a Presidential Rank Award for Meritorious Service.

In 2000, the National Oceanic and Atmospheric Administration (NOAA) honored Foster by creating a scholarship program in her name for women and members of minority groups. The Dr. Nancy Foster Scholarship Program was signed into law on November 13, 2000. In the spring of 2000, NOAA's Dr. Nancy Foster Florida Keys Environmental Center was named in Foster's honor and funded through the U.S. Department of Commerce, and she received the Fred M. Packard Award in 2000 to recognize her work in establishing marine protected areas.

NOAAS Nancy Foster (R 352), a National Oceanic and Atmospheric Administration research vessel, was commissioned on May 10, 2004. The Nancy Foster was originally built as a Navy yard torpedo test craft, Agate Pass (YTT 12), at McDermott Shipyards in Amelia, Louisiana, and launched in September 1990. In 2001, the Navy transferred the vessel to NOAA, outfitted to conduct coastal research along the United States East and Gulf Coasts and in the Caribbean.

== Personal life ==
While a Smithsonian associate in the 1960s, Foster met and married Roger Cressey. They later divorced. Foster's later marriage to Jerry Cramer also ended in divorce. She married Joseph R. Geraci in May 2000.
