= Angela Gillespie =

American religious sister

Mother Angela Gillespie
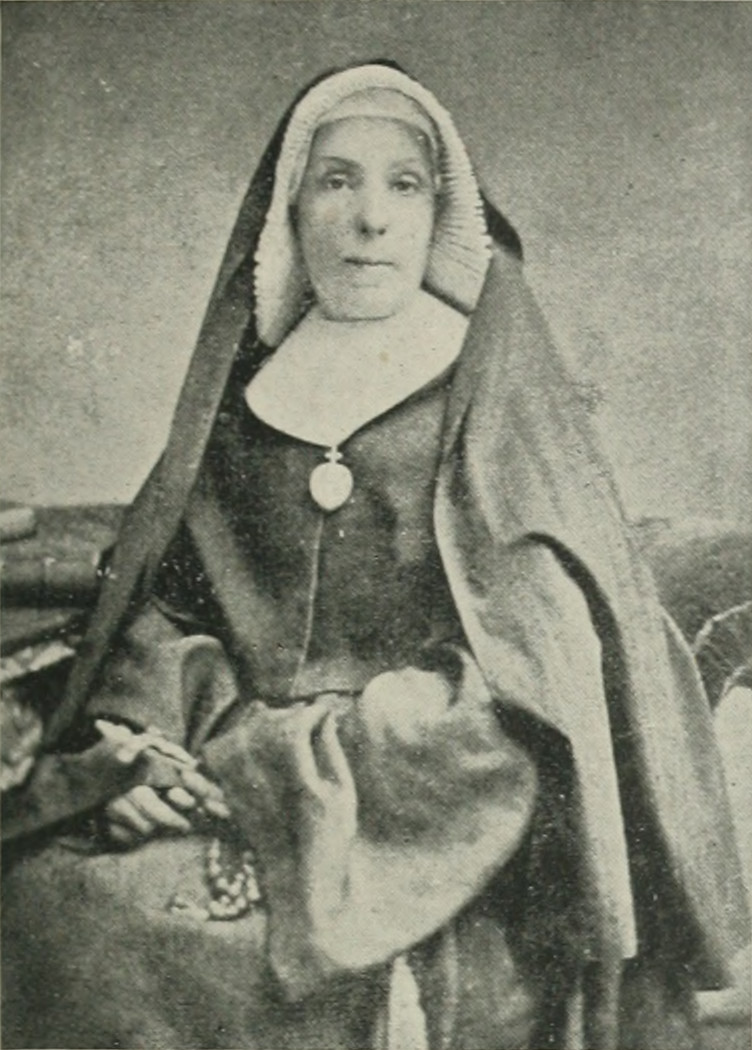
- Born: Eliza Maria Gillespie; February 21, 1824; Brownsville, Pennsylvania, United States
- Died: March 4, 1887 (aged 63); South Bend, IN, United States
- Other name: Sister Angelica
- Occupations: Religious sister, Abbess
- Parent(s): John Purcell Gillespie and Mary Madeleine Miers

Eliza Maria Gillespie (February 21, 1824 – March 4, 1887), also known by her religious name Mary of St. Angela, was an American religious sister, mother superior, and foundress of many works of the Sisters of the Holy Cross in the United States.

== Early years and education ==
Gillespie was born February 21, 1824, near Brownsville, Pennsylvania, the daughter of John Purcell and Mary Madeleine Miers Gillespie, the latter a Catholic convert. James G. Blaine, son of Ephraim Lyon and Maria Gillespie Blaine, was a cousin and playmate.

After her husband's death, Mary Gillespie in 1838 went with her three children to her former home, Lancaster, Ohio. Eliza Maria was first educated at a private school near her home, and then attended the school of the Dominican Sisters at Somerset, Ohio, and completed her studies at the Georgetown Visitation Monastery in Washington, D.C., in 1844. After graduating, she taught for a time at an academy in St. Mary's County, Maryland.

Her kinsman, Thomas Ewing of Ohio, was then eminent in public life, and this fact, joined to her beauty and accomplishments, made her at once a prominent figure in the social life of Washington and of Ohio. Her sympathy was roused by the sufferings of the Irish people during the famine, and she and her cousin, Eleanor Ewing, by their joint efforts, collected a large sum of money for their relief.

== Religious life ==
In 1853, she felt called to enter the order of the Sisters of Mercy. She went to Notre Dame, Indiana, to bid farewell to her brother who was there engaged in his studies for the priesthood, and there she met Edward Sorin, Provincial Superior of the Congregation of Holy Cross in the United States, through whose influence she was led to cast her lot with this small and struggling community. She received the religious habit in 1853, taking the name of Sister Mary of St. Angela. She was then sent to France, where she made her novitiate at the convent of the Bon Secours Sisters, at Caen, making her religious profession by special dispensation on 8 December 1853, at the hands of the priest Basil Moreau, founder of the congregation.

In January, 1850, Gillespie returned to America and was made superior of St. Mary's Academy at Bertrand, Michigan. On 15 August 1855, she transferred the academy to its present location near Notre Dame, Indiana, and procured for it a charter from the Indiana legislature. Gillespie had considerable business and executive talents, having managed her stepfather's farm.

== Civil War ==
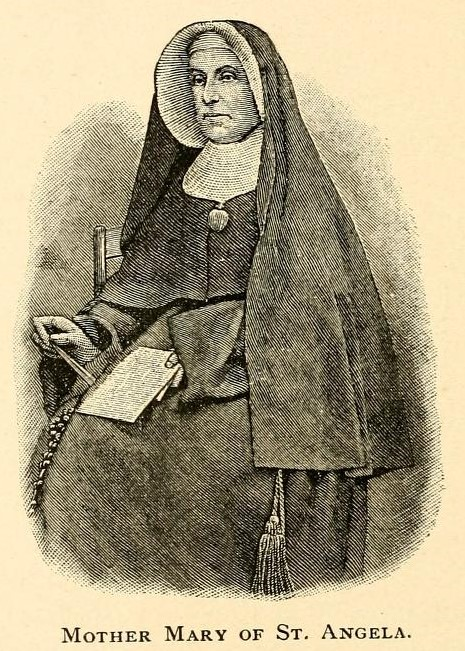
Illustration of Mother Angela Gillespie

When the Civil War broke out Gillespie organized a corps of eighty Sisters of Holy Cross to care for the sick and wounded soldiers. Four of the sisters were assigned to the USS Red Rover, the U.S. Navy's first hospital ship, which served the Mississippi Squadron until the end of the American Civil War. They were the first female nurses to serve on board a Navy ship.

She established hospitals, both temporary and permanent, and, when generals failed to secure needed aid for the sick and wounded, she made trips to Washington on their behalf. Her influence in Washington was significant both because of her family connections and because of the recognition of her wonderful work for the sick and wounded soldiers. Her headquarters were at Cairo, Illinois, in ill-provided buildings. The close of the war left her physically enfeebled, but she returned to St. Mary's and resumed her educational work.

== Later life ==
She compiled two series of readers for use in Catholic schools, the "Metropolitan" and "Excelsior".

In 1869, at the advice of Bishop Luers of Fort Wayne, the Sisters of the Holy Cross in the United States determined on a separation from the members of the congregation in France. This was effected with Gillespie as Superior General of the new congregation. Under her rule, thirty-five institutions were founded throughout the United States, among them St. Cecilia's and Holy Cross Academies, Washington, D. C.; St. Mary's Academy, Salt Lake City, Utah; St. Mary's Academy, Austin, Texas; St. Catherine's Normal Institute, Baltimore, Maryland; and Hawke's Hospital, Mt. Carmel, Columbus, Ohio. Gillespie was the moving spirit in the establishment in 1865 of the "Ave Maria", to whose pages she made many contributions. On laying down the burdens of her superiorship, Gillespie was chosen Mistress of Novices at St. Mary's, and in September, 1886, she was again made the head of St. Mary's Academy, at which post she remained until her death.

Gillespie's brother was Neal Henry Gillespie.
