= Mary Collins (theologian) =

American theologian and nun (1935–2024)

Sr. Mary Collins
- Title: Prioress, Mount St. Scholastica monastery

Personal life
- Born: Mary Collins; September 16, 1935 Chicago, Illinois, U.S.
- Died: May 2, 2024 (aged 88) Atchison, Kansas, U.S.
- Education: Catholic University of America (Ph.D, liturgical theology)

Religious life
- Religion: Christianity
- Denomination: Roman Catholicism
- Order: Benedictine
- Profession: religious leader, author, professor

Senior posting
- Period in office: 1999–2005

Mary Collins (September 16, 1935 – May 2, 2024) was an American theologian and Benedictine nun. She was a founding member of the North American Academy of Liturgy (NAAL), an ecumenical and inter-religious association of liturgical scholars who collaborate in research concerning public worship, and went on to serve as president of both NAAL and the North American Liturgical Conference. She was also elected the tenth prioress of the Mount St. Scholastica Monastery in Atchison, Kansas.

== Early life and education ==
Mary Collins was born in Chicago, Illinois on September 16, 1935, to Lauretta (LaCosse) and Homer Collins and had two brothers. She graduated from Mount St. Scholastica College and entered the Benedictine order in Atchinson, Kansas in 1957.

== Career ==
Collins taught high school before entering Catholic University of America (CUA) where she earned a doctoral degree in sacramental and liturgical studies. After completing her doctorate, she taught religious studies at Benedictine College and the University of Kansas and then returned to CUA in 1978 as associate professor of religious studies. In 1983, she became chair of the CUA Department of Religion and Religious Education.

In the mid-1970s, she was a founding member of the North American Academy of Liturgy (NAAL), an ecumenical and inter-religious association of liturgical scholars who collaborate in research concerning public worship. She went on to serve as its president (1986) and also served as president of the North American Liturgical Conference. She was also a member of the International Commission on English in the Liturgy and directed its Psalter project.

Collins has been classified as among the "first generation of Catholic reconstructionist feminist theologians." In 1983, she joined Mary E. Hunt, Diann Neu, and others to found the Women's Alliance for Theology, Ethics and Ritual (WATER), a nonprofit organization that describes itself as "committed to theological, ethical, and ritual development by and for women."

On June 13, 1999, Sr. Mary Collins was elected the tenth prioress of the Mount St. Scholastica monastery in Atchison, Kansas and left CUA. She served in that role until 2005. She also served the Federation of St. Scholastica for twelve years as first councilor and consulted on or wrote many of their documents. Collins was also a frequent book reviewer for the periodical Benedictines and for the Journal of Religion.

Collins died at the Mount St. Scholastica monastery on May 2, 2024.

== Honors ==
Collins was invited to give the 1987 Madeleva Lecture, the third in a series that continues to be hosted by the Center for Spirituality, Saint Mary's College, in Notre Dame, Indiana. She presented "Women at Prayer," which asserted that a patriarchal ecclesiastical church had dismissed or suppressed women's experiences, and then highlighted the practices of several contemporary women whom Collins described as "unashamed Godseekers who have not been afraid to trust and to give expression to their experiences of God." In 2000, she was one of sixteen past Madeleva Lecturers who developed and signed the Madeleva Manifesto, a critique of the patriarchal structure of the Catholic Church.

In 1993, she received North American Academy of Liturgy's Berakah Award, which is given to liturgists or persons of an allied vocation in recognition of distinguished contribution to the professional work of liturgy.

Collins received the Michael Mathis Award from the Notre Dame Center for Pastoral Liturgy in 1995.

In 2000, she received the Jubilate Deo Award from the National Association of Pastoral Musicians in recognition of a substantial contribution to the development of pastoral liturgy in the United States.

In 2014, Marquette University awarded her an Honorary Degree: Doctor of Religious Studies.

== Selected works ==
- "A liturgy of invocation" in Women and Catholic Priesthood : An Expanded Vision : Proceedings of the Detroit Ordination Conference. (ed. by Anne Marie Gardiner). New York: Paulist Press, 1976. ISBN 9780809119554q
- It Is Your Own Mystery : A Guide to the Communion Rite. (with Melissa Kay). Washington: The Liturgical Conference, 1977. ISBN 0918208173
- “Critical Questions for Liturgical Theology,” in Worship 53, 1979, 302–17 (Described by Bruce T. Morrill, S.J. in a 2012 Catholic Theological Society of America presentation as "a tour de force both in content and methodology.")
- Can We Always Celebrate the Eucharist? (ed. with David Noel Power and Marcus Lefebure). Edinburgh: T.& T. Clark, 1982. ISBN 0567300323
- "Creative improvisation, oral and written, in the first centuries of the Church" in Liturgy : A Creative Tradition. (ed. with David Noel Power and Marcus Lefebure). Edinburgh: T. & T. Clark, 1983. ISBN 9780816424429
- Blessing and Power. (ed. with David Noel Power and Marcus Lefebure). Edinburgh: T. & T. Clark, 1985. ISBN 0567300587
- "Neither clergy nor laity: woman in the church" in Women, Invisible in Theology and Church. (ed. with Elisabeth Schüssler Fiorenza and Marcus Lefébure). Edinburgh: T. & T. Clark, 1985. ISBN 9780567300621
- The Fate of Confession. (with David Noel Power). Edinburgh: T. & T. Clark, 1987. ISBN 0567300706
- Worship: Renewal to Practice. Washington, DC: Pastoral Press, 1987. ISBN 9780912405322
- Women at Prayer. Ramsey, N.J.: Paulist Press, 1987. ISBN 9780809129492
- The New Dictionary of Theology. (ed. with Joseph A. Komonchak and Dermot A. Lane). Collegeville, MN: Liturgical Press, 1987. ISBN 9780894536090
- "Participation: liturgical renewal and the cultural question" in The Future of the Catholic Church in America: Major Papers of the Virgil Michel Symposium. Collegeville, MN: Liturgical Press, a compilation of major presentations in a symposium held July 11–14, 1988 at St. John's Abbey in Collegeville, Minnesota. ISBN 9780814619810
- Music and the Experience of God. (with David Noel Power and Mellonee Victoria Burnim). Edinburgh: T. & T. Clark, 1989. ISBN 9780567300829
- Contemplative Participation: Sacrosanctum Concilium Twenty-Five Years Later. Collegeville, MN: Liturgical Press, 1990. ISBN 9780814619223
- "Is the Eucharist still a source of meaning for women?" in Living in the Meantime: Concerning the Transformation of Religious Life, (ed. by Paul J.Philibert, O.P.). Ramsey, N.J.: Paulist Press, 1994. ISBN 9780809135196
- "Mystagogy: Discerning the Mystery of Faith" pp. 73–104 in A Commentary on the Order of Mass of The Roman Missal: A New English Translation. (General Editor Edward Foley; Associate Editors: John F. Baldovin, Mary Collins, Joanne M. Pierce), Collegeville, MN: Liturgical Press, 2011. ISBN 9780814662472
- "The Church and the Eucharist," Catholic Theological Society of America Proceedings 52 (1997): 19–34, especially 30–34. cited in Morrill, Bruce T. 2012. “Performing the Rite of Marriage: Agency, Identity, and Ideology.” Proceedings of the North American Academy of Liturgy, August, 93–105.
- “Recovering Hope Under Dim Ecclesial Horizons.” 2011. Benedictines 64 (2): 6–17. She delivered this address to retreat directors at Sophia Center in Atchison, Kan., in August 2011.
- "Ritualizing Endings for the Sake of New Beginnings" Chapter 5 in A Not-so-Unexciting Life : Essays on Benedictine History and Spirituality in Honor of Michael Casey, OCSO. (Michael Casey and Carmel Posa, eds). Athens, Ohio: Cistercian Publications, 2017. ISBN 9780879072698
