= Disappearance of Reed Jeppson =

1964 disappearance of a Salt Lake City teenager

Coordinates: 40.60526°N 111.79431°W

Reed Jeppson
- Born: Reed Taylor Jeppson; May 28, 1949
- Disappeared: October 11, 1964 (aged 15); Salt Lake City, Utah, United States
- Status: Missing for 61 years, 10 months and 18 days
- Monuments: Tombstone in Larkin Sunset Lawn Cemetery
- Occupations: Student; Paperboy

Reed Taylor Jeppson (born May 28, 1949, disappeared October 11, 1964) was an American teenager who disappeared along with his two dogs as he walked them on the afternoon of October 11, 1964 in Salt Lake City, Utah. Despite an extensive search and media coverage (including renewed attention in the early 2010s), neither Jeppson nor the dogs have been located.

== Background ==
Reed Taylor Jeppson was born on May 28, 1949, to Elizabeth and Edward Jeppson. At the time of his disappearance, he had eleven siblings and he and his family lived in Salt Lake City, Utah; they also had a summer home in Montana. Jeppson was a sophomore at East High School, and played on the school's football team. He also was a paperboy.

Jeppson was described as a good and popular student with many friends in both Salt Lake City and Montana, and who enjoyed training his dogs to hunt birds.

== Disappearance and investigation ==
The Jeppson family had attended church on the morning of October 11, 1964. Afterwards, Jeppson went to feed and walk his two German Shorthaired Pointers, one an adult and the other a puppy, telling his sister he would return within 30 minutes for dinner. The dogs were kept about 200 yards from the Jeppson residence. A friend of Jeppson's saw him walking the dogs near the College of Saint Mary-of-the-Wasatch at around 1 PM. He was wearing a white knit cotton shirt, a reversible parka with a black side and the other blue, blue Levi's jeans and gym shoes.

Neither Jeppson nor either dog returned home. Although investigators stated there is no evidence of foul play in his disappearance, Jeppson's loved ones do not believe he ran away, stating that he was not having any problems and that he had left at home all his belongings (including money he'd earned from his paper route). His sister believes Reed was taken against his will.

Despite an intense initial search and media coverage, Jeppson remains missing. He is described as a white male with blond hair and blue eyes, and with dental braces in 1964.

Age progression of Jeppson to age 60 by the National Center for Missing & Exploited Children

As of 2012 Jeppson's disappearance is the oldest active missing person case in the Salt Lake City Police Department’s files, and the department announced in 2010 they would reexamine the case.

In September 2012, Salt Lake City police searched a gully using shovels and a backhoe for Jeppson's remains, which yielded no results.

Jeppson's family had a tombstone for him interred at Larkin Sunset Lawn Cemetery in Salt Lake City, listing his birth and disappearance dates. His parents are now deceased and are buried in this same cemetery.

== See also ==
- List of people who disappeared mysteriously: 1910–1990
