= Neal Henry Gillespie =

American Catholic religious figure

Neal Henry Gillespie, C.S.C. (January 19, 1831 – November 12, 1874) was an American Catholic religious figure. A priest of the Congregation of Holy Cross, he served as vice-president of Notre Dame, and later president of the College of St. Mary of the Lake in Chicago.

== Life ==
Neal Henry Gillespie was born in Brownsville, Pennsylvania, the son of John Purcell and Mary Madeleine Miers Gillespie, the latter a Catholic convert. His older sister Eliza Maria, would later become Mother Angela Gillespie of the Sisters of the Holy Cross, and highly respected nurse during the Civil War. James G. Blaine, son of Ephraim Lyon and Maria Gillespie Blaine, was a cousin. Senator Thomas Ewing of Ohio, foster father of William Tecumseh Sherman, was also a kinsman. After her husband's death in 1838, Mrs. Gillespie went with her three children to her former home, Lancaster, Ohio.

Gillespie was one of the first students at the University of Notre Dame, Indiana, and in 1849 received the first degree conferred by that institution. On September 1, 1851, he entered the novitiate of the Congregation of Holy Cross at Notre Dame, Indiana, made his religious profession August 15, 1853, and was ordained priest June 29, 1856, at Rome, where he had been sent to complete his theological studies. Returning to America, he filled the post of vice-president and director of studies at Notre Dame (1856–59), and then was appointed president of the College of St. Mary of the Lake, Chicago, Illinois.

In 1863, he was called to the mother-house of the congregation at Le Mans, France, where he remained until 1866. He then returned to Notre Dame and assumed the editorship of the Ave Maria Press, which position he filled until his death. In addition to his editorial labors, he was a frequent contributor to its pages, as well as to many other Catholic periodicals. He died at Saint Mary's College, Notre Dame, Indiana.
