= Home for Christmas (Sheryl Crow album) =

Studio album by Sheryl Crow
- Released: November 26, 2008
- Recorded: June 2008
- Studio: Odditorium Studio (Mendocino, CA); Capitol Studios (Los Angeles, CA)
- Genre: Christmas; country; jazz
- Length: 45:35
- Label: A&M
- Producer: Bill Bottrell

Sheryl Crow chronology
Detours (2008)	Home for Christmas (2008)	100 Miles from Memphis (2010)

Singles from Home for Christmas
- 1. "There Is a Star That Shines Tonight" Released: 2009; 2. "The Christmas Song" Released: 2009

Home for Christmas is a Christmas album and the seventh studio album by American singer Sheryl Crow, first released in 2008 exclusively at Hallmark stores. The album was re-released in 2010 exclusively at Target stores with new artwork. In 2011, it finally received a major release worldwide, on CD and as a digital download. As of December 2011, it has sold 40,000 copies in the US.

Crow previously recorded "Blue Christmas" in 1997 as part of the A Very Special Christmas 3 collection, in a completely different arrangement.

== Track listing ==
No.	Title	Writer(s)	Length
1.	"Go Tell It on the Mountain"	Traditional	3:06
2.	"The Christmas Song"	Mel Tormé, Robert Wells	3:22
3.	"White Christmas"	Irving Berlin	3:30
4.	"I'll Be Home for Christmas"	Kim Gannon, Walter Kent, Buck Ram	3:41
5.	"Merry Christmas Baby"	Lou Baxter, Johnny Moore	3:15
6.	"The Bells of St. Mary's"	Emmett Adams, Douglas Furber	4:33
7.	"Blue Christmas"	Bill Hayes, Jay Johnson	3:24
8.	"O Holy Night"	Traditional	3:39
9.	"There Is a Star That Shines Tonight"	Sheryl Crow	3:58
10.	"Hello My Friend, Hello" (2008 and 2011 editions only)	Bill Botrell	3:40
11.	"All Through the Night"	Traditional	5:13
12.	"Long Road Home" (2011 edition only)	Crow, Doyle Bramhall II, Justin Stanley	4:14

Note: "O Holy Night" features a minute-long intro of "It Came Upon the Midnight Clear".

== Charts ==
=== Album ===
Chart (2010)	Peak position
US Billboard 200	164
US Top Holiday Albums (Billboard)	4

=== Singles ===
Year	Single	Peak positions
Year	Single	US AC
2009	"There Is a Star That Shines Tonight"	—
2009	"The Christmas Song"	24
