= NOAAS Nancy Foster =

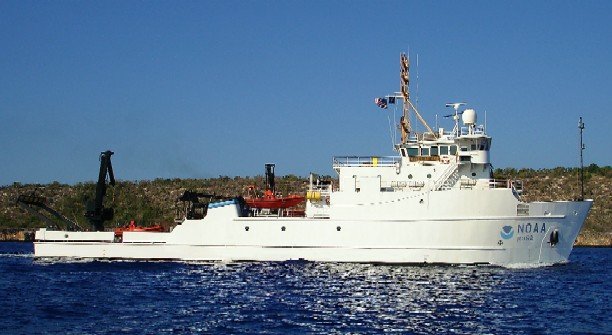

History

United States
- Name: USS Agate Pass - YTT 12
- Operator: United States Navy
- Ordered: 1 December 1988
- Builder: McDermott, Inc., Amelia
- Completed: 6 September 1990
- Acquired: 1 July 1991
- Out of service: 13 August 1999
- Identification: IMO number: 8993227
- Fate: Transferred to NOAA

United States
- Name: NOAAS Nancy Foster
- Namesake: Nancy Foster
- Operator: National Oceanic and Atmospheric Administration
- Acquired: 31 January 2000
- Recommissioned: 10 May 2004
- Home port: Charleston, South Carolina
- Identification: IMO number: 8993227; MMSI number: 369912000; Callsign: WTER
- Status: Active in NOAA fleet

General characteristics
- Displacement: 1,190 tons full load
- Length: 186 ft (57 m)
- Beam: 40 ft (12 m)
- Draft: 12.8 ft (3.9 m)
- Propulsion: 1,400 hp (1,000 kW) diesel main propulsion (re-powered in 2019); 2 × 300 hp (220 kW) z-drive; 400 hp (300 kW) Omnithruster bow thruster
- Speed: 12 knots (22 km/h; 14 mph) max
- Capacity: 39 passengers
- Crew: 5 officers + 15 crew

NOAA Ship Nancy Foster (R 352) is a National Oceanic and Atmospheric Administration research vessel. The ship is named for Dr. Nancy Foster, who was the director of the National Marine Fisheries Service's Office of Protected Resources from 1986 until 1993, and the director of the National Ocean Service from 1997 until her death in 2000.

== Construction and commissioning ==
The ship was originally built as the United States Navy Cape Flattery-class torpedo trials craft Agate Pass (YTT 12) at McDermott Shipyards in Amelia, Louisiana, and launched in September 1990. In 2001, the Navy transferred the vessel to NOAA, which outfitted her to conduct coastal research along the United States East Coast and United States Gulf Coast and in the Caribbean. NOAA commissioned her as NOAAS Nancy Foster (R 352) on 10 May 2004.

== Technical characteristics ==
The hull of Nancy Foster is 186 feet (57 m) long with a beam of 40 feet (12 m) and a draft of 12 feet 10 inches (3.91 m). The ship has a total of 39 bunk spaces. She carries a complement of 6 NOAA Corps officers, 15 crew including 3 licensed engineers, and up to 17 visiting scientists. In 2018, the ship began a series of mid-life upgrades to extend her service life by another 30 years. Upgrades include installing new, more powerful diesel generators & main propulsion engines, renewing major equipment and performing extensive preservation.

The deck equipment features two winches and two deck cranes, along with an aft A-Frame and a port side A-Frame. This equipment gives the crew of the Nancy Foster the ability to do a variety of over-the-side oceanographic operations including launching and tending Remotely Operated Vehicles (ROV) and conductivity, temperature and depth (CTD) operations. She also has hull mounted transducers that support multi-beam surveys, Acoustic Doppler Current Profiling (ADCP) and shallow water surveying.

== Service history ==
Nancy Foster supports applied research for the NOAA National Ocean Service's Office of Ocean and Coastal Resource Management and the National Marine Sanctuary Program, the NOAA Oceanic and Atmospheric Research's Office of Ocean Exploration, Atlantic Oceanographic and Meteorological Laboratory, the National Undersea Research Program, and the National Sea Grant College Program. Operations include the characterization of various habitats in NOAA's National Marine Sanctuaries, pollution assessments, and studies to improve understanding of the connection between marine habitats and estuaries. The ship supports scientific data collection through bottom fish trawling, sediment sampling, side-scan sonar and multi-beam surveying, sub-bottom profiling, core sampling, scientific diving with air and Nitrox, ROV operations, and servicing oceanographic/atmospheric surface and subsurface buoys. The vessel employs state of the art navigation and propulsion systems resulting in high quality and efficient data collection.

In August 2009, a NOAA-led team aboard Nancy Foster found and photographed a wreck 20 nautical miles (37 km; 23 mi) off Cape Hatteras, North Carolina, and on 9 September 2009 the team's leader announced that the wreck had been identified as that of the U.S. Navy yard patrol boat USS YP-389, sunk during World War II by the German submarine U-701 on 19 June 1942. The wreck rests in about 300 feet (91 m) of water in a region known as the "Graveyard of the Atlantic," where several U.S. Navy and Royal Navy vessels, merchant ships, and German U-boats were sunk during the Battle of the Atlantic.

== See also ==
NOAA ships and aircraft
