= Cape Flattery-class torpedo trials craft =

Cape Flattery class
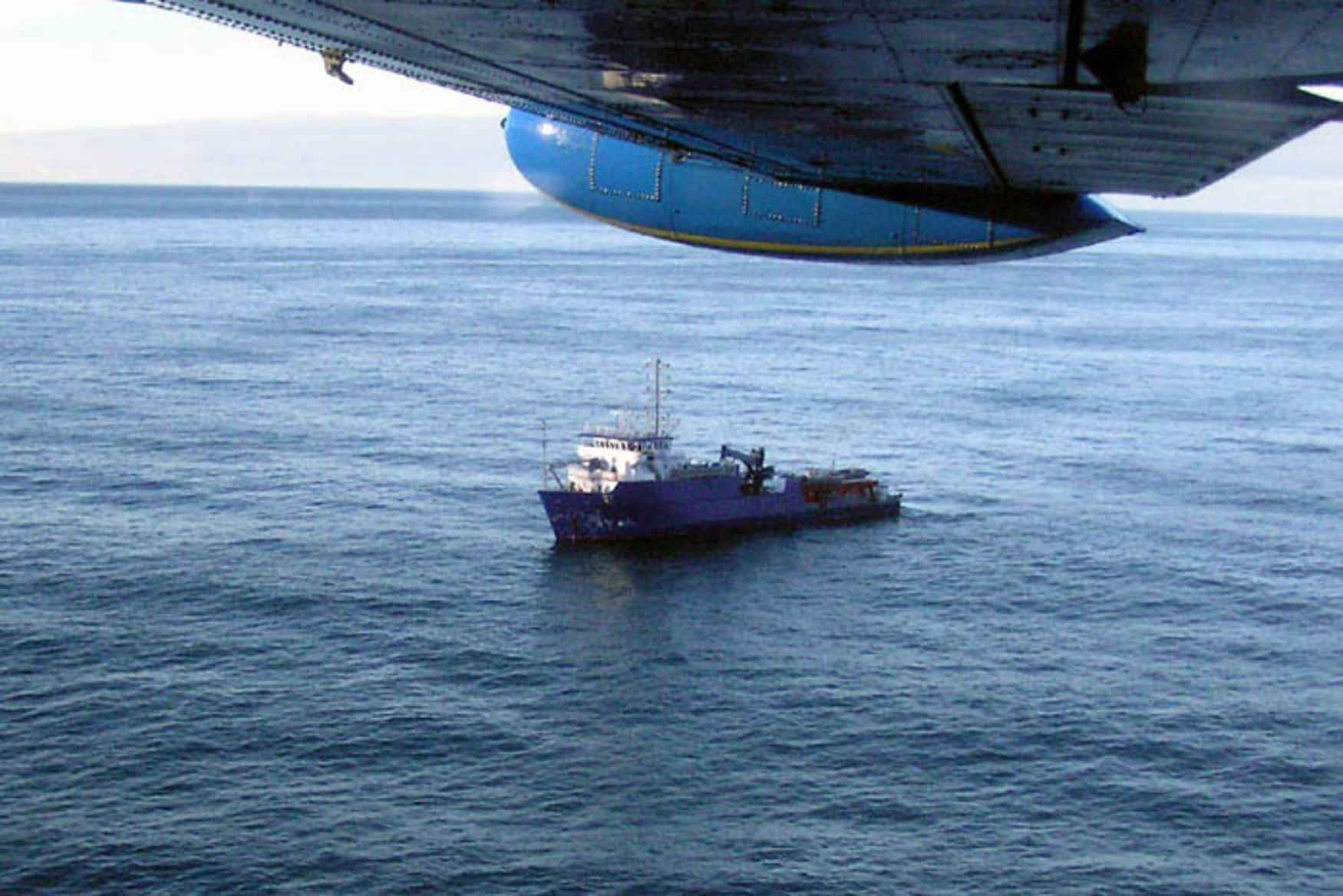
- Cape Flattery, in commercial service

General characteristics
- Displacement: 1168 t.
- Length: 186 ft (57 m)
- Beam: 40 ft (12 m)
- Draft: 11 ft (3.4 m) (max)
- Propulsion: diesel, 3 screws
- Armament: none

The Cape Flattery class is a class of four torpedo trials craft in the United States Navy. All active craft are currently assigned to the Naval Undersea Warfare Center in Keyport, Washington.

== Ships in class ==
Cape Flattery-class torpedo trials craft
Ship Name	Hull No.	Launch date	Status	Notes
Cape Flattery	YTT-9	5 May 1989	Stricken, disposed of by way of transfer to other agency. Briefly operated by US Seafoods as Seafreeze America.	
Battle Point	YTT-10	17 August 1989	Active	
Discovery Bay	YTT-11	22 February 1990	Active	
Agate Pass	YTT-12	9 June 1990	Stricken, disposed of by way of transfer to other agency. Currently operates as NOAAS Nancy Foster.	
