= Leo Podolsky =

Leo Podolsky (May 25, 1891 – October 1, 1987) was a classical pianist and educator.

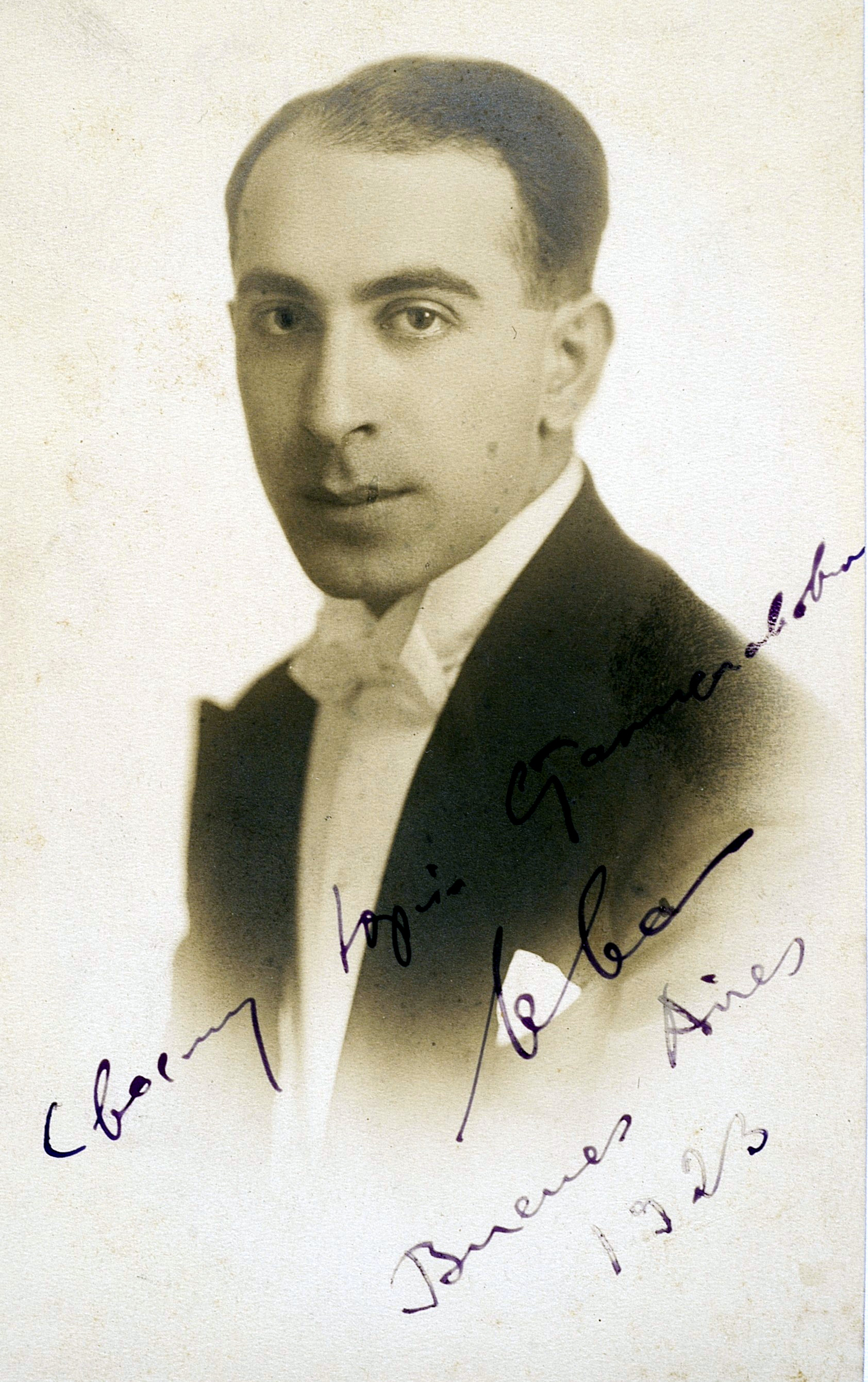
Leo Podolsky

== Biography ==
Podolsky was born in Odessa, Russian Empire on May 25, 1891.

Leo Podolsky had many piano teachers in his youth, but George Lalewicz was credited as the most successful. Podolsky also studied at the Cracow Conservatory, and, eventually, he enrolled in the Vienna Academy of Music, where he won the Liszt and the Anton Rubinstein prizes. Podolsky made his Berlin debut in 1912.

Podolsky had reached agreement on an international concert tour at the time of his graduation, but it was canceled at the onset of World War I. He was inducted into the Russian military, and during his service, gave concerts in Russia and Siberia. Stranded in Yokohama, Japan by the Russian Revolution, Podolsky gave 426 performances in a tour of Asia and the Pacific Rim that he organized. He also appeared with symphony orchestras in Java, Japan, China, the Philippines, Federated Malay States, Dutch East Indies, British India, Burma and Ceylon. Upon his return to Europe, Podolsky taught at Berlin's New Conservatory of Music and gave concerts throughout Europe. Podolsky made his United States debut in Chicago, Illinois in 1924 where he gave three recitals over eight weeks. He also performed with the Chicago Symphony Orchestra. He made his New York City debut on December 1, 1927 at Town Hall.

Podolsky headed the piano department at Saint Marys College in Notre Dame, Indiana for 18 years, and later joined the faculty of the Sherwood Music School in Chicago in 1926, where he taught for 58 years. Podolsky moved to Burbank, California in 1983 after the death of his second wife. His extensive collection of music memorabilia was donated to the University of Southern California Music Department on his death.

Leo Podolsky recorded numerous piano rolls for the American Piano Company (Ampico).

He died in Los Angeles, California on October 1, 1987.

== Books written or edited ==
- Khaki and Tails: The Autobiography of Dr. Leo Podolsky, By Leo Podolsky, distributed by TMR Productions, 1977
- Piano Progress: Approach to Music for the Partially Sighted, By June Davison, Ardella Schaub, Leo Podolsky, Volkwein, 1972
- Duet Playing: Piano, edited by Leo Podolsky, Alfred Publishing, 1985

== Further reading and listening ==
- Interview with Leo Podolsky, By Sulamit Vickers, American Jewish Committee, New York Public Library, Dorot Jewish Division. Oral History Collection, New York Public Library, Published 1979
