= Pauline O'Neill (sister) =

American nun and college president (1854–1935)

Mother M. Pauline O'Neill (Bridget) C.S.C.

1st President of Saint Mary's College (Indiana)
- In office 1895–1931
- Succeeded by: Sister Irma Burns, C.S.C.

Personal details
- Born: 1854 Peoria, Illinois
- Died: 1935 (aged 80–81) South Bend, Indiana; Notre Dame, Indiana
- Education: St. Mary's Academy (later became Saint Mary's College (Indiana))
- Occupation: Roman Catholic Nun; President of Saint Mary's College
- Profession: Roman Catholic sister College President

Mother M. Pauline O'Neill, C.S.C. (1854–1935), was the first president of Saint Mary's College in Notre Dame, Indiana.

In 1908, the charter for Saint Mary’s Academy was amended to authorize the legal existence of a college, and Mother Pauline, then Director, became the College’s first President. Known as the “builder for God” because of the unprecedented growth during her tenure, Mother Pauline’s most notable accomplishment – Le Mans Hall – still stands as the most recognizable symbol of Saint Mary's. Her tenure was from 1895-1931.
