= Holy Cross Girls' High School (Dhaka) =

- হলি ক্রস উচ্চ বালিকা বিদ্যালয়
- Crest of Holy Cross Girls' High School

Location
- Tejgaon, Dhaka; 1215; Bangladesh; 23.7584°N 90.3912°E

Information
- Other names: Holy Cross School (HCS)
- Type: Private Missionary
- Religious affiliations: Catholic Church (Sisters of the Holy Cross)
- Established: 1951; 75 years ago
- School board: Dhaka Education Board
- School district: Dhaka
- Headmistress: Sr. Kolpona Costa, Sr.Sheshanti Nokrek
- Faculty: 57
- Grades: 1 to 10
- Female
- Enrollment: 1,800
- Language: Bangla and English
- Campus type: Urban
- Colors: Maroon and Light Gray
- Song: হে মোদের প্রিয় বিদ্যাপীঠ
- Newspaper: Mandira (মন্দিরা)
- Website: holycrossgirlshighschool.com

Holy Cross Girls' High School is a Catholic primary and secondary school for girls, located at Tejgaon in Dhaka, Bangladesh. It serves students from class 1 through class 10. Although run by the Roman Catholic Church, the school is open to students of all religions. The founder of the school is Sister Augustine Marie. The school has a motto that says, "Honoring the past, inspiring the future." The school is famous for its discipline and education quality.

== History ==
The Sisters of the Holy Cross started Holy Cross Girls' High School near the Holy Rosary Church in 1951 as a kindergarten with two students. The next year it became a primary school. Later it was accredited by the Dhaka Board of Intermediate and Secondary Education as a secondary school serving students through class 10. The first batch of students from the school sat their Secondary School Certificate (SSC) examinations in 1966. By that time, the school had humanities and science sections. It opened a commerce section in 1999.

== Extracurricular activities ==
Students take part in quiz recitation, debate club, arts and crafts competitions, girl guides, and girl scouts. There is a science fair every other year.

== Awards and recognition ==
The school won the Ministry of Education's 'Best National School' prize twice, in 1997 and 2003. In other years the Ministry has ranked it among the top ten schools in Dhaka.

== See also ==
- Notre Dame University Bangladesh
- Holy Cross College, Dhaka
- St. Joseph Higher Secondary School
