= Ave Maria Press =

Catholic publishing company

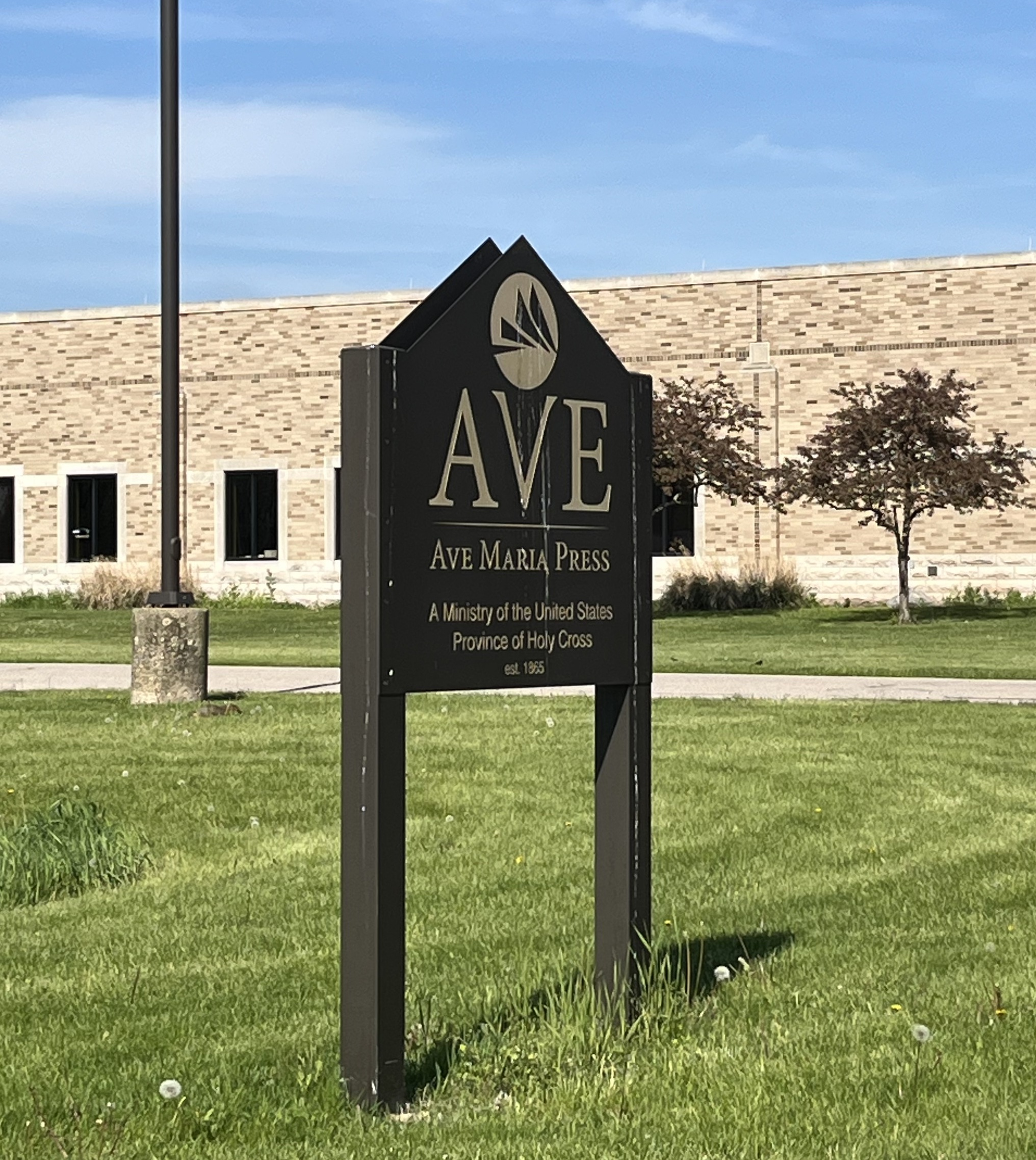
- Sign outside Ave Maria Press headquarters
- Parent company: Congregation of Holy Cross
- Founded: 1865
- Founder: Edward Sorin
- Country of origin: United States
- Headquarters location: Notre Dame, Indiana
- Distribution: Ingram Content Group, Baker & Taylor (US); Bayard Novalis Distribution (Canada); Garratt Publishing (Australia); Pleroma Christian Supplies (New Zealand); Alban Books (UK)
- Publication types: Books
- Imprints: Sorin Books, Christian Classics, Forest of Peace
- Official website: www.avemariapress.com

Ave Maria Press is a Catholic publishing company which was founded on May 1, 1865, by Edward Sorin, a Holy Cross priest who had founded the University of Notre Dame.

== History ==
Ave Maria Press is one of the oldest Catholic publishing houses in the United States. Sorin founded the company in order to publish the Ave Maria magazine, a magazine focused on Catholic families, honoring the Virgin Mary, and showcasing Catholic writings. He purchased a printing press in Chicago, and set it up in Brownson Hall at Notre Dame.

Neal Henry Gillespie was editor of Ave Maria Magazine from 1868 until his death in 1874. Sorin placed Gillespie's sister, Angela Gillespie, a veteran nurse of the American Civil War, in charge of editorial management. In the early days, much of the work of typographer and pressmen was done by the Holy Cross brothers. The Sisters of the Holy Cross assisted in various editorial and production capacities. Orestes Brownson, Robert Hugh Benson, and James Gibbons were contributors to the magazine. In 1875, Daniel Hudson became editor, a position he held until 1930.

By 1900, Ave Maria was the largest English-language Catholic magazine worldwide. At the same time, Ave Maria diversified its offerings, releasing books and pamphlets as well as the magazine. The magazine was started in 1865 and continued until 1970 when it was dropped due to decline in circulation.

== Current work ==
Ave Maria Press now focuses solely on the publishing of Catholic books. The company's bestselling book is Joseph M. Champlin's Together for Life, a guide for couples planning a Catholic wedding. Ave Maria Press is located on Moreau Drive on the campus of the University of Notre Dame.
