= Colégio Santa Maria (São Paulo) =

Location
- Av. Sargento Geraldo Sant'Ana, 901; São Paulo, São Paulo (state); Brazil

Information
- Motto: "Educar para conhecer, viver e ser." ("Educating to know, to live, and to be.")
- Religious affiliation: Catholic Apostolic
- Patron saint: Saint Mary
- Established: 1948
- Founders: Sister Charlita Enright, Sister Olivette Whalen, Sister Caecilius Roth and Sister Armella Guerrero
- Principal: Sister Vanessa Cruz Ferreira CSC
- Age range: 2-18
- Language: Brazilian Portuguese
- Campuses: 3
- Campus size: 180,000 m²
- Colors: Navy blue and yellow
- Song: The Bells of St. Mary's (song)
- Website: colsantamaria.com.br

Colégio Santa Maria is an American Catholic institution founded in 1948 and located in the southern part of the city of São Paulo, Brazil, and founded and maintained by the Congregation of Holy Cross. Initially founded as an exclusively female school, the college has expanded its educational offerings over the years, including cultural courses, programs for underprivileged children, and a preschool.

Located in the Jardim Marajoara neighborhood, in the southern part of São Paulo, the college occupies a 180,000 m² campus, with five buildings designed by renowned architects such as Croce, Aflalo, and Gasperini, in addition to having extensive green areas. Recognized as one of the leading private schools in the State of São Paulo, Santa Maria College offers preschool, elementary, middle, and high school education, as well as evening supplementary education, serving approximately 3,500 students and currently directed by Professor Dr. Flávia Cristina Faria Dias.

The institution adopts a humanistic educational approach, adapted to different learning styles, emphasizing the practical application of knowledge for a deeper understanding. Furthermore, it seeks to promote the holistic development of students, including cognitive, motor, and socio-emotional aspects.

== School's History ==
In 1947, in the United States, the Congregation of the Sisters of the Holy Cross extended its missionary field of action, sending sisters to São Paulo seeking to meet the most urgent needs of the people and the Church, such as school education and catechesis. Thus, a group of Sisters, Sister Charlita Enright, Sister Olivette Whalen, Sister Caecilius Roth and Sister Armella Guerrero, left for here. Soon after their arrival, what they actually found were challenges to overcome. With the help of Fr. Lionel Corbeil, they were given the house in Vila Betânia, where they set up a school for girls. At that time, young women who finished high school rarely continued their studies. In Vila Betânia, these young women were received and learned religion, art, decoration and practiced different sports. The nuns, however, desired a more active and fruitful work.

In 1948, the sisters initiated three educational projects: a cultural course for young women from the upper class of that time, a school for underprivileged children, and a preschool, which throughout its history has aimed to guarantee a quality education and develop essential ethical values in the formation of the person, following the philosophical and pedagogical principles of Father Moreau.

The school was directed for a long time by Sister Anne Veronica Horner Hoe (1948-2019) and Sister Diane Clay Cundiff (1945), who retired from the position at the end of 2025.

The school's official anthem is the song The Bells of Saint Mary's, composed by A. Emmett Adams in 1917.

== Portal Caleidoscópio ==
Caleidoscópio Magazine is a magazine created by the school to record the events and achievements of the school community throughout its 25 years of existence. Started as a print magazine, it now continues its legacy on the Caleidoscópio Portal, offering a comprehensive and diverse view of the school's educational activities, adapting to the digital environment to reach a wider audience and explore new learning opportunities.

== Festa Junina ==
The Festa Junina at Colégio Santa Maria is an annual event that involves students from all grades and alumni in themed quadrilhas. The dances aim to culturally honor diverse peoples or cultures. In addition to the performances, the event offers a variety of traditional treats such as popcorn, corn, canjica (a type of corn pudding), and quentão (a hot mulled wine-like drink), available at stalls. Children can participate in games such as fishing, boca do palhaço (clown's mouth), goal kicking, and chicken throwing. It is recognized as one of the most traditional Festa Junina in São Paulo, having been featured in Veja magazine.

== New High School ==
The school underwent several reforms to its high school curriculum after the approval of the New High School system in Brazil. Today, it offers a curriculum with opportunities in sports, participation in olympiads, socio-emotional development, and preparation for university entrance exams.

Educational pathways (activities that students can choose from) are offered, accounting for 20% of the course load. Among the options are: Molecular Architecture; Urban Art; Backstage; Basketball Club; Volleyball Club; Film Studies; Fundamentals of Statistics; Sign Language; Creative Writing Workshop; Photography Workshop; Theater Workshop; The Hunger Games; International Relations Workshop; Internet: Freedom and Control; Casa XXI; Human Body and Genetics; Financial Education and Investments; Criminal Investigation.
