= Dolores R. Leckey =

American writer and Catholic leader (1933–2023)

- Title: Executive Director

Personal life
- Born: Dolores Regina Conklin; 12 April 1933 Queens, New York
- Died: 17 January 2023 (aged 89) Arlington, Virginia
- Education: St. John's University and George Washington University

Religious life
- Religion: Roman Catholic
- Institute: U.S. Bishops' Secretariat for Family, Laity, Women, and Youth
- Founder of: founding director
- Profession: religious leader, author, speaker

Senior posting
- Period in office: 1977 - 1997

Dolores R. Leckey (April 12, 1933 – January 17, 2023) was the founding director of the Secretariat for Family, Laity, Women, and Youth, and was at that time one of the highest ranking women in the Roman Catholic Church in the United States. She served in that role for 20 years. In 1996, she staffed the Bishops' Committee on Women in Society and in the Church. In the foreword to the report issued by that Committee on Women, Bishop John C. Dunne, who served as chairman, praised her skill and leadership in guiding the committee's work. From 1998 to 2012 she was a Senior Fellow at the Woodstock Theological Center of Georgetown University, the first woman who served in that role.

== Early life and education ==
Dolores Regina Conklin Leckey was born in New York City on April 12, 1933, to Joseph and Florence (Kelly) Conklin. She was the youngest of five children. She studied literature and theology at St. John's University and received her bachelor's degree from St. John's University in 1954.

== Early career and family life ==
Leckey taught high school and began further studies at New York University at night. She married Thomas Philip Leckey in 1957 and they moved to South Bend, Indiana while he pursued his doctorate. The couple relocated to Arlington, Virginia in 1958 and, during a period of illness, she began reading Catholic mystics.

During a period of five years, she had four children, Mary Kate, Celia, Thomas Joseph, and Colum. She held a variety of jobs including teaching at the DeSales School of Theology and as a producer for public television. She earned a master's degree in adult education from George Washington University in 1971.

Thomas Leckey died in 2003, a loss she explored in her 2008 book, Grieving With Grace: A Woman’s Perspective. She married famed New York teacher & track coach Joe Schatzle in 2008 and he died in 2011.

== Community involvement ==
In the early 1970s, she co-led a meditation group with Jerry May for the Shalem Institute for Spiritual Formation. The two also worked on developing the Shalem Spiritual Guidance Program and began writing books.

Dolores and Thomas Leckey were for many decades part of a prayer group that was an outgrowth of the Christian Family Movement. In 1986, they and three other couples began studying the Pastoral Letter on Economic Justice issued by the U.S. Conference of Catholic Bishops. This inspired them to work to address the need for affordable housing in Arlington, Virginia. Each couple contributed $250 and they formed the Arlington Partnership for Affordable Housing (APAH).

Dolores Leckey served as a trustee of St. Mary's Seminary and University in Baltimore, the University of Dayton in Ohio, and the Northern Virginia Community College.

== Career ==
Although the Second Vatican Council (1962-1965) had addressed the role laity in a decree on the apostolate of the laity, Apostolicam actuositatem, it was not until a decade later that the U.S. Conference of Catholic Bishops (USCCB) established a secretariat to address the laity. In October 1977, Dolores R. Leckey was hired as the founding director of the Secretariat for Family, Laity, Women, and Youth. This made her the first laywoman to head a secretariat of the USCCB.

Mercy Sister Sharon Euart, the first woman to serve as associate general secretary of the USCCB, described Leckey as feeling "called to help the bishops -- to help the bishops understand what the role of laity, family and women were in the Church," noting that, while this was challenging, Leckey did it in a way "that was grounded in the Gospel, and grounded in faith."

At the 1980 Synod of Bishops on the family, Leckey served as an official adviser to the U.S. bishops. She played that same role as an official adviser in Rome at the 1987 Synod of Bishops on the laity. In 1996, she staffed the Bishops' Committee on Women in Society and in the Church. In the foreword to the report issued by that Committee on Women, Bishop John C. Dunne, who served as chairman, praised her skill and leadership in guiding the committee's work.

In 1991, Dolores Leckey gave the Madeleva Lecture at St. Mary's College in Notre Dame, Indiana. That lecture became the basis for her book Women and Creativity. On April 29, 2009, the Feast of St. Catherine of Sienna, she joined 15 other Madeleva lecturers in issuing THE MADELEVA MANIFESTO: A Message of Hope and Courage.

From 1998 to 2012 she was a Senior Fellow at the Woodstock Theological Center of Georgetown University, the first woman who served in that role.

She contributed to Catholic News Service's weekly "Faith Alive!" religious education package and was a frequent conference presenter.

Edward P. Hahnenberg, the Breen Chair in Catholic theology at John Carroll University, eulogized Dolores Leckey as a great unsung hero of American Catholicism, saying that he doubted that "there is anyone who played a greater role in helping the hierarchy hear the voices of the laity in the decades that followed Vatican II."

== Honors ==
Dolores Leckey received honorary doctorates from 13 universities—and used the hoods from the academic regalia she received at those commencement ceremonies to make a quilt.

In 1989, she was the first recipient of the Juan Diego Award by the National Association for Lay Ministry, "which recognizes an outstanding witness to the spirit and values embodied in the life of the lay minister Juan Diego the first saint of the Americas."

In November 1997, she received the Pro Ecclesia et Pontifice medal.

In 2003, Dolores Leckey was recognized with a Person of Vision Award, from the Arlington County Commission on the Status of Women as one of four "Women Pioneering the Future.'

On June 25, 2004, Dolores Leckey was presented with the Cardinal Joseph Bernardin Award by the Catholic Common Ground Initiative. She was its third recipient after the National Council of Catholic Women (2001) and the Most Rev. Harry J. Flynn and the Archdiocese of St. Paul-Minneapolis (2003).

In 2012, Dolores Leckey received the St. Elizabeth Seton Medal from Mount St. Joseph University, an award established to recognize distinguished women in theology.

== Selected works ==
- The ordinary way: a family spirituality (Crossroads, 1982) ISBN 978-0-8245-0442-7, 0-8245-0442-9
- Journeying together: proceedings of three regional convocations on shared responsibility in America with Caroline Chastain (Office of Publication and Promotion Services, U.S. Catholic Conference, 1985)
- Laity stirring the church: prophetic questions (Fortress Press, 1987) ISBN 978-0-8006-1659-5, 0-8006-1659-6
- One body: different gifts, many roles: reflections on the American Catholic laity (Office of Publication and Promotion Services, U.S. Catholic Conference, 1987) ISBN 978-1-55586-162-9, 1-55586-162-8
- Practical spirituality for lay people (Sheed & Ward, 1987) ISBN 978-0-934134-80-4
- Women and Creativity (Paulist Press, 1991) ISBN 978-0-8091-3259-1, 0-8091-3259-1
- Winter Music: A Life of Jessica Powers: Poet, Nun, Woman of the 20th Century. (Sheed & Ward, 1992) ISBN 978-1-55612-559-1
- Seven essentials for the spiritual journey (Crossroads Publications, 1999) ISBN 978-0-8245-1783-0, 0-8245-1783-0
- Spiritual Exercises for Church Leaders: Facilitator's Guide with Paula Minaert (Paulist Press, 2003)
- Spiritual Exercises for Church Leaders: Participants Book with Paula Minaert (Paulist Press, 2003)
- "'Grace Given to Each': Spirituality and Administration" in Called and Chosen: Toward a Spirituality for Lay Leaders edited by Zeni Fox and Regina M. Bechtle, SC (Sheed & Ward, 2005) ISBN 0-7425-3200-3
- The Laity and Christian Education: Apostolicam Actuositatem, Gravissimum Educationis in REDISCOVERING VATICAN II, Series Editor : Christopher M. Bellitto (Paulist Press, 2006) ISBN 0-8091-4220-1
- "The Church is the Lay Faithful" Chapter 26 in The Many Marks of the Church edited by William Madges and Michael J. Daley (Twenty-Third Publications, 2006) ISBN 978-1-58595-589-3, 1-58595-589-2
- Grieving With Grace: A Woman’s Perspective. (Franciscan Media, 2008) ISBN 978-0-86716-888-4, 0-86716-888-9
- Monika K. Hellwig: the people's theologian with Kathleen Dolphin (Liturgical Press, 2010) ISBN 978-0-8146-5696-9, 978-0-8146-5730-0
- Interior Journey: A Spirituality for Contemporary Seekers (Twenty-Third Publications, 2015) ISBN 978-1-62785-128-2, 1-62785-128-3
