= Mary C. Boys =

American theologian

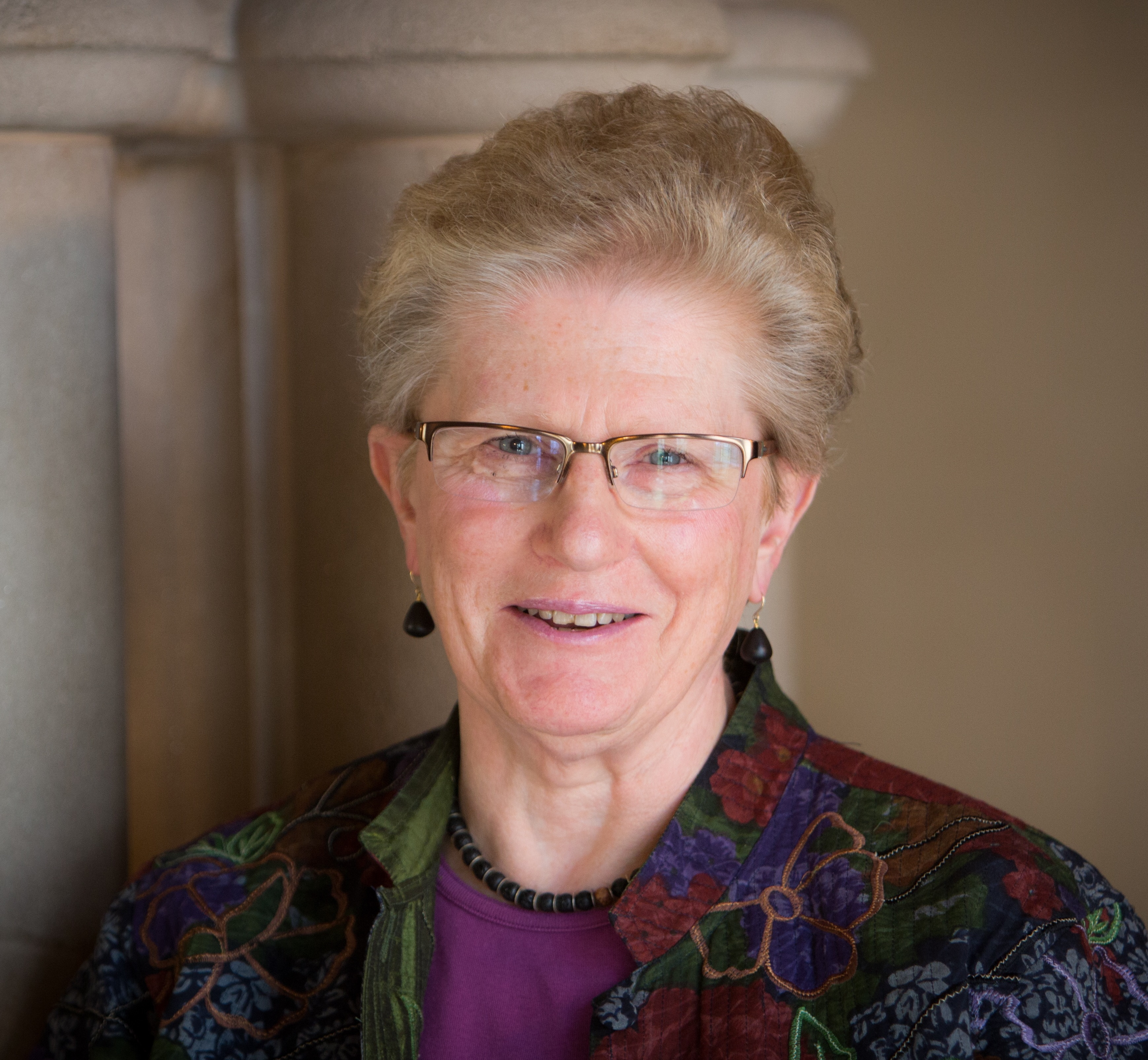
- Born: November 4, 1947 (age 78); Seattle, Washington, US
- Title: Skinner and McAlpin Professor of Practical Theology at Union Theological Seminary

Academic background
- Education: Fort Wright College of the Holy Names (Spokane, Washington), Columbia University and Union Theological Seminary in the City of New York
- Alma mater: Columbia University and Union Theological Seminary in the City of New York (EdD)
- Thesis: (1978)

Academic work
- Institutions: Boston College; Union Theological Seminary
- Notable works: Has God Only One Blessing? (2000)

Mary C. Boys (born November 4, 1947), a member of the Sisters of the Holy Names of Jesus and Mary, is an American scholar specializing in religious studies. Currently, Boys is the Skinner and McAlpin Professor of Practical Theology at Union Theological Seminary in the City of New York. At Union, Boys served as the Dean of Academic Affairs for many years. She was formerly Professor of Religious Education at Boston College, where she served for 17 years.

== Education ==
- Fort Wright College of the Holy Names in Spokane, Washington, B.A. in Religion and Humanities, 1969
- Columbia University and Union Theological Seminary in the City of New York, M.A. 1975
- Columbia University and Union Theological Seminary in the City of New York, Ed.D. 1978
- Hebrew Union College-Jewish Institute of Religion, Doctor of Humane Letters, 2000
- Catholic Theological Union (Chicago, Illinois), Doctor of Theology, 2006
- The Jewish Theological Seminary of America, Doctor of Letters, 2011
- Gratz College, Doctor of Humane Letters, 2012

== Biography ==
Mary Claire Boys was born in Seattle, Washington, to Ruth Wegner Boys and M.C. [Milford Charles] Boys. She grew up in the midst of the pre-Vatican II Catholic church. Living in Seattle she was immersed in conversations with friends across multiple faith traditions. The Second Vatican Council opened up new possibilities for leadership and action within the church, and Boys noted that the Vatican II document Nostra Aetate, published in 1965, provided a crucial catalyst for her formation and imagination.

In August 1965 Boys joined a Roman Catholic women's religious order, the Sisters of the Holy Names of Jesus and Mary. In 1969 Boys completed a BA in Religion and Humanities at Fort Wright College of the Holy Names in Spokane, Washington and began her teaching career as an instructor in Religion and in English at the Holy Names Academy in Spokane. She made her final vows to the community in 1972.

Building on her vocation as an educator Boys moved to New York City to undertake the joint M.A. in Religion and Education at Columbia University and Union Theological Seminary, a degree she completed in 1975. Following that degree she entered their EdD program, and in 1978 she successfully defended her dissertation: "“Heilsgeschichte” as a hermeneutical principle in religious education," which was done under the mentorship of the late biblical scholar Raymond E. Brown and philosopher of education Dwayne Huebner.

From 1977 to 1994 she was on the faculty of Boston College, moving fluidly through the process from instructor to full professor. While there she wrote voluminously, garnering a reputation as the key Catholic scholar in the field of religious education who was engaging issues of Jewish/Christian understanding.

In 1994 she returned to her alma mater, Union Theological Seminary, as the Skinner and McAlpin Professor of Practical Theology, and in July 2013 she was installed as Dean of Academic Affairs at Union. She continues to hold both of these positions.

== Contributions to Religious Education ==
Boys began her research in the field of religious education by engaging historical critical biblical scholarship, which was only then beginning to have an impact in the Catholic context due to Vatican II. Her first book, Biblical Interpretation in Religious Education, was published by the Religious Education Press in 1980. In addition to numerous articles, chapters, and public lectures she became deeply involved with the Association of Professors and Researchers in Religious Education. That association led to her ground-breaking scholarly collaboration with Dr. Sara Lee in Christian-Jewish learning and dialogue.

Boys has made contributions to the field of religious education through her work on “learning in the presence of the other.” The recipient of many large grants, she has been a senior advisor to several national projects, including the Valparaiso Project in the Education and Formation of Faith, the Catholic-Jewish Colloquium, Educating for Religious Particularism and Pluralism, and the ATS Project on Christian Hospitality and Interreligious Education.

=== Awards ===
Boys received the International Council of Christians and Jews Sir Sigmund Sternberg Award in 2005, the Eternal Light Award from the Center for Catholic-Jewish Studies at St. Leo University in 2012, the Ann O’Hara Graff award from the CTSA Women's Consultation on Constructive Theology in 2013, and the Shevet Achim Award in 2014 from the Council of Centers on Jewish-Christian Relations. She has honorary doctorates from four institutions, and has given endowed lectures at multiple colleges and universities, including the 1997 Madeleva Lecture at St. Mary's College, Notre Dame, Indiana, and The Cardinal Willebrands Lecture in Amsterdam, Netherlands. She was a Luce Fellow in Theology from 2009 to 2010.

=== Books ===
- Boys, Mary (2025). Blessing of a New Dawn: Reorienting Christianity's Relation to Judaism. Orbis Books. ISBN 978-1626986213.
- Boys, Mary (2013). Redeeming Our Sacred Story: The Death of Jesus and Relations between Jews and Christians. A Stimulus Book. New York and Mahway, New Jersey: Paulist Press. ISBN 978-0809148172.
- Boys, Mary (2006). Christians and Jews in Dialogue: Learning in the Presence of the Other. Co-author with Sara S. Lee. Woodstock, Vermont: Skylight Paths Publishing. ISBN 978-1594732546.
- Boys, Mary (2005). Has God Only One Blessing? Judaism as a Source of Christian Self-Understanding. New York and Mahway, New Jersey: Paulist Press. ISBN 978-0809139316.
- Boys, Mary (1997). Jewish-Christian Dialogue: One Woman's Experience. New York and Mahway, New Jersey: Paulist Press. ISBN 978-0809137381.
- Boys, Mary (1989). Educating in Faith: Maps and Visions. San Francisco, California: Harper & Row. ISBN 978-0060610371.
- Boys, Mary (1988). Education for Citizenship and Discipleship. New York, New York: Pilgrim. ISBN 978-0829807967.
- Boys, Mary (1981). Ministry and Education in Conversation. Winona, Minnesota: St. Mary’s Press. ISBN 978-0884891260.
- Boys, Mary (1980). Biblical Interpretation in Religious Education. Birmingham, Alabama: Religious Education Press. ISBN 978-0891350224.

=== Edited books ===
- Boys, Mary; Cunningham, Philip A.; Sievers, Joseph; Henrix, Hans Hermann; Svartvik, Jesper, eds. (2011). Christ Jesus and the Jewish People Today: New Explorations of Theological Interrelationships. Grand Rapids, MI: Eerdmans. ISBN 978-0802866240.
- Townsend, John; Beck, Norman; Catalano, Rosann M.; Fisher, Eugene J.; McGerry, Michael B.; Merkle, John C.; Pawlikowski, John T.; Sherman, Franklin; Spillman, Joann (2005). Boys, Mary C. (ed.). Seeing Judaism Anew: Christianity's Sacred Obligation. Lanham, MD: Rowman and Littlefield. ISBN 978-0742548824.
