= Cynthia Ahearn =

American echinodermologist (1952–2008)

Cynthia Anne Gust Ahearn (October 17, 1952 – August 31, 2008) was an American echinodermologist and museum specialist at the Smithsonian Institution. She was responsible for the curation of the Smithsonian's extensive collection of echinoderms. An impactful individual in the field of echinodermology, Ahearn identified nearly 300,000 echinoderm specimen lots and had a nearly complete cataloged collection for the National Museum of Natural History Echinodermata. Ahearn was also responsible for several newsletters during her career, as well as the Discovery Cart, a segment on the Discovery Channel's Young Scientist program. In 2005, Ahearn was presented with the Natural History Museum's Public Outreach Award. Ahearn even had an echinoderm named after her in 2007.

== Early life ==
Ahearn was born in Minneapolis, Minnesota. Ahearn studied at the Dunbarton College of the Holy Cross in Washington, D.C. In 1973, Ahearn initiated her Smithsonian career, working as a museum specialist.

== Career ==
After two decades of working at the Smithsonian, Ahearn was the editor, writer, and assembler of the International Echinoderm Newsletter from 1993 to 2003, as well as the editor of the Virtual Echinoderm Newsletter. Ahearn also cataloged nearly the entire collection of Echinodermata for the NMNH. Ahearn initiated the Discovery Cart program on the Discovery Channel and was presented with the National History Museum's Public Outreach Award. Ahearn was also known to give tours to all generations of students. She hosted international visitors to the Smithsonian Institution from many countries, and provided her taxonomic acumen to help salient scientific institutions. Among these are Woods Hole Oceanographic Institution, the National Marine Fisheries Service, New Zealand's National Institute of Water and Atmospheric Research (Wellington), the California Academy of Sciences (in San Francisco, California), the Museum of Comparative Zoology, the Museums Victoria (in Melbourne, Australia).

== Death ==
Around the time of her death, Ahearn had been doing research on shallow water, deep water, and Antarctic sea cucumbers. Ahearn was survived by her husband, John Ahearn and her daughter Tracey.

== Publications ==
Ahearn published many noteworthy works, including:

Philippine Brittlestars (Echinodermata: Ophiuroidea) Described by R. Koehler (1922): A Corrected and Annotated List of Type Specimens C. Ahearn Smithsonian Institution Press	1992
Catalog of the type specimens of seastars (Echinodermata: Asteroidea) in the National Museum of Natural History, Smithsonian Institution C. Ahearn Smithsonian Institution Press	1995
Bathyal echinoderms of the Galápagos Islands D.L. Pawson, C. Ahearn Echinoderms, 41–46	2000
Western Atlantic sea cucumbers of the order Molpadiida (Echinodermata: Holothuroidea) D.L. Pawson, D.J. Vance, C. Ahearn Bulletin of the Biological Society of Washington	2001
Bathyal echmoderms of the Galapagos Islands D.L. Pawson, C. Ahearn Echinoderms 2000: Proceedings of the 10th International Conference, Dunedin ...	2001
A review of pygal-furrowed Synallactidae (Echinodermata: Holothuroidea), with new species from the Antarctic, Atlantic and Pacific oceans P.M. O’Loughlin, C. Ahearn Memoirs of Museum Victoria 62 (2), 147–179	2005
Equinodermos (Echinodermata) de las aguas mexicanas del Golfo de México [Echinoderms (Echinodermata) from the Mexican waters of the Gulf of Mexico]. A. Durán-González, A. Laguarda-Figueras, F.A. Solís-Marín, S.B.E. Buitrón, B.E.B. Sánchez, ... Revista de Biología Tropical 53, 53–68	2005
Equinodermos (Echinodermata) del Caribe Mexicano [Echinoderms (Echinodermata) of the Mexican Caribbean]. A Laguarda-Figueras, F.A. Solís-Marín, A. Durán-González, C. Ahearn, ... Revista de Biología Tropical 53, 109–122	2005
Equinodermos (Echinodermata) del Golfo de California, México F.A. Solís-Marín, A. Laguarda-Figueras, A. Durán-González, C. Ahearn, ... Revista de Biología Tropical 53, 123	2005
Echinoderms (Echinodermata) from Central America Caribbean. J.J. Alvarado, F.A. Solís-Marin, C. Ahearn Revista de Biología Tropical 56, 37–55	2008
Antarctic and Sub-Antarctic species of Psolidium Ludwig (Echinodermata: Holothuroidea: Psolidae) P.M. O’Loughlin, C. Ahearn Memoirs of Museum Victoria 65, 23–42	2008
Equinodermos (Echinodermata) del Caribe Centroamericano J.J. Alvarado, F.A. Solís-Marín, C. Ahearn Revista de Biología Tropical 56 (Suppl 3), 37–55	2008
Echinoderm (Echinodermata) diversity in the Pacific coast of Central America J.J. Alvarado, F.A. Solís-Marín, C. Ahearn Marine Biodiversity 40 (1), 45–56	2010
Deep-sea fauna of European seas: An annotated species check-list of benthic invertebrates living deeper than 2000 m in the seas bordering Europe. Ophiuroidea I.S. Smirnov, D. Piepenburg, C. Ahearn, K. von Juterzenka Invertebrate Zoology 11 (1), 192–209	2014
