= Bertrand, Michigan =

Former village in Michigan, United States

Coordinates: 41°46′27″N 86°15′45″W

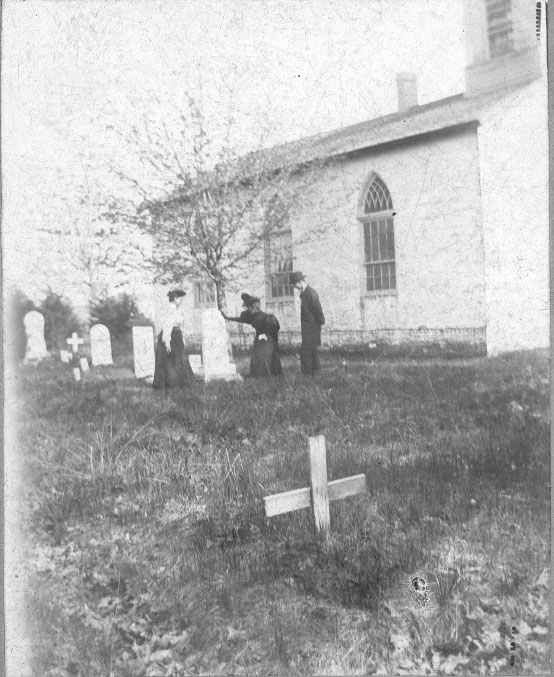
Old St. Joseph church in Bertrand Cemetery (University of Notre Dame Archives)

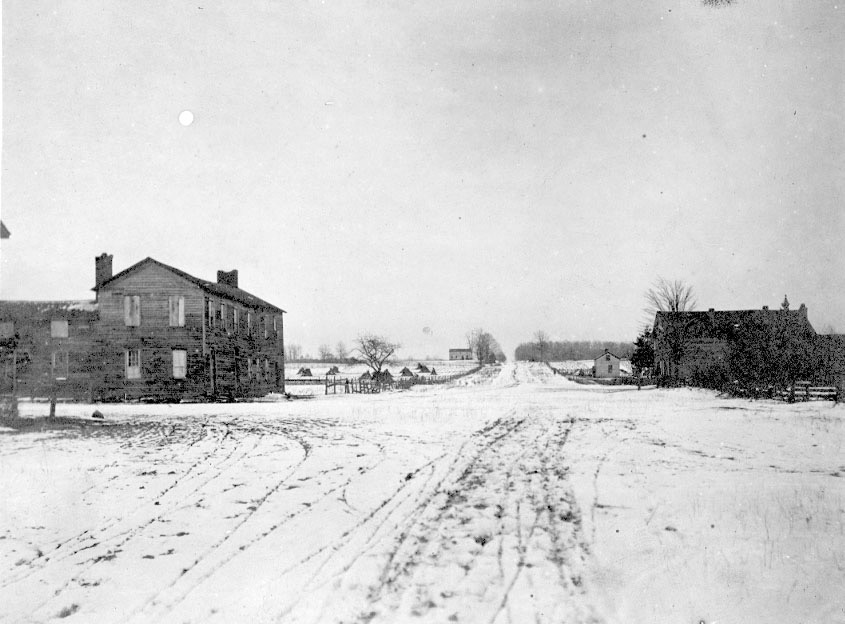
Late 19th century photo of Bertrand, MI. Bertrand Tavern on the left (University of Notre Dame Archives)

Bertrand was a village in the southern part of Niles Charter township on the St. Joseph River approximately 4 miles (6 km) south of the city of Niles. Joseph Bertrand, a French Canadian, had a trading post here by 1812. He had married the daughter of a Potawatomi chief and through her had acquired land. After the Potowatomi ceded their lands to the federal government with the 1833 Treaty of Chicago, Daniel G. Garnsey obtained the permission of U.S. President Andrew Jackson and the consent of Mrs. Bertrand to locate a village on her land. Alonzo Bennett platted the village of Bertrand in 1833 and became its first postmaster on June 9, 1834. The town was a stop on the Detroit-Chicago road. In 1844, the Sisters of the Holy Cross founded their first convent in the United States here. The town gradually declined after it was by-passed by railroads. The post office closed on April 15, 1901.
