= College of Saint Mary-of-the-Wasatch =

Former Catholic college in Utah, US

Coordinates: 40.7398°N 111.8112°W

The College of Saint Mary-of-the-Wasatch was a private, Catholic women's college, later St. Mary of the Wasatch High School, located in Salt Lake City, Utah, from 1875 to 1969. It was operated by the Sisters of the Holy Cross as a University for girls and also as a Boarding School for girls in Grades 1 through 8. Yvonne Young, whose great uncle was Brigham Young, was - from time to time - a St. Mary's of the Wasatch Boarding School student.

The school was located in the eastern reaches of Salt Lake City, in the foothills of the Wasatch Range. In addition to being home to the college - in the 1940's St. Mary of the Wasatch was a Boarding School that accepted First through Eighth Grade girls who Boarded at St. Mary's. During this time, St. Mary's also had several "Day Students" in Grades 1 through 8. Some years later St. Mary's became a high school only. It also housed a convent. Starting in 1931, it was affiliated with the Sisters-run Holy Cross Hospital nursing college, which itself closed in 1973, a year after the school was demolished in 1972 to make way for a housing subdivision. One of the stone gates of the entrance was incorporated into a house. It is the last place where teenager Reed Taylor Jeppson was seen in 1964.

Its records are held in the Sisters of the Holy Cross Archives in Notre Dame, Indiana.
