= Saint Mary's College (Indiana) =

Liberal arts college in Notre Dame, Indiana, U.S.

Coordinates: 41°42′24.28″N 86°15′25.31″W

- Motto: Spes unica (Latin)
- Motto in English: Our only hope
- Type: Private women's liberal arts college
- Established: 1844; 182 years ago
- Religious affiliation: Catholic Church (Sisters of the Holy Cross)
- Academic affiliations: ACCU; CIC; NAICU
- Endowment: $311.2 million (2024)
- President: Katie Conboy
- Provost: Megan Zwart
- Faculty: 167 full-time 63 part-time
- Undergraduates: 1,600
- Location: Notre Dame, Indiana, United States
- Campus: Rural, 75 acres (0.30 km^{2})
- Colors: Blue and White
- Nickname: Belles
- Sporting affiliations: NCAA Division III – MIAA
- Mascot: Belle
- Website: saintmarys.edu

Saint Mary's College is a private Catholic women's liberal arts college in Notre Dame, Indiana, United States. Founded in 1844 by the Sisters of the Holy Cross, the name of the school refers to the Virgin Mary.

== History ==
In 1843, four Sisters of the Holy Cross came from Le Mans, France, to share in the apostolate of education under invitation of Edward Sorin, who together with his priests and brothers of the Congregation of Holy Cross had founded the University of Notre Dame. In 1844, the sisters opened their first school in Bertrand, Michigan, about six miles from Notre Dame; it was a boarding academy with pre-collegiate grades. In 1855 the school moved to its present site, under the leadership of Mother Angela Gillespie. The main building and a former blacksmith shop used as an office were drawn by oxen to the new location.

Ellen Ewing Sherman, wife of General William Tecumseh Sherman, was a cousin of Mother Angela Gillespie, directress of Saint Mary's Academy. In 1864, Ellen took up temporary residence in South Bend, Indiana, to have her young family educated at the University of Notre Dame and Saint Mary's. At the age of fifteen, Mary Ellen Quinlan, who later became the mother of playwright Eugene O'Neill, attended Saint Mary's Academy and graduated with honors in music, playing Chopin's Polonaise for piano, op. 22, at the commencement.

Saint Mary's College eventually grew from the academy. A typewriting course was introduced in 1886; students practiced on Remington typewriters. In 1915 a course in auto mechanics was offered in hopes that students would become "intelligent" drivers. It was taught by Miss Mary Callahan, who had taken a course at a Studebaker plant in Detroit, and John Seibert, the college chauffeur. Studebaker executive A.R. Erskine donated a vehicle for hands-on instruction.

In 1945, Saint Mary's Academy moved to the former Erskine estate on the south side of South Bend. Saint Mary's College is located across the street (Indiana 933) from the University of Notre Dame. Saint Mary's was the first women's college in the Great Lakes region.

Today the school offers five bachelor's degrees and four master's degrees (the master's programs are co-educational). There are approximately 120,000 living alumnae. Proposals to merge with University of Notre Dame (then a men's institution) in the early 1970s were rejected by Saint Mary's College, and Notre Dame became coeducational on its own in 1972. The college resides within the Diocese of Fort Wayne-South Bend.

In 2023, the board of trustees first agreed to admit transgender female students, later rescinding the decision because many members of the community considered it a "threat to our Catholic identity."

=== Presidents ===
- M. Pauline O'Neill, 1895–1931
- Irma Burns, 1931–1934
- Madeleva Wolff, 1934–1961
- Maria Renata Daily, 1961–1965
- Mary Grace Kos, 1965–1967
- John J. McGrath, 1968–1970
- Alma Peter, 1970–1972 (interim appointment)
- Edward L. Henry, 1972–1974
- John M. Duggan, 1975–1985
- William A. Hickey, 1986–1997
- Marilou Eldred, 1997–2004
- Carol Ann Mooney, 2004–2016
- Janice Cervelli, 2016–2018
- Nancy P. Nekvasil, 2018–2020 (interim appointment)
- Katie Conboy, 2020–present

== Campus ==
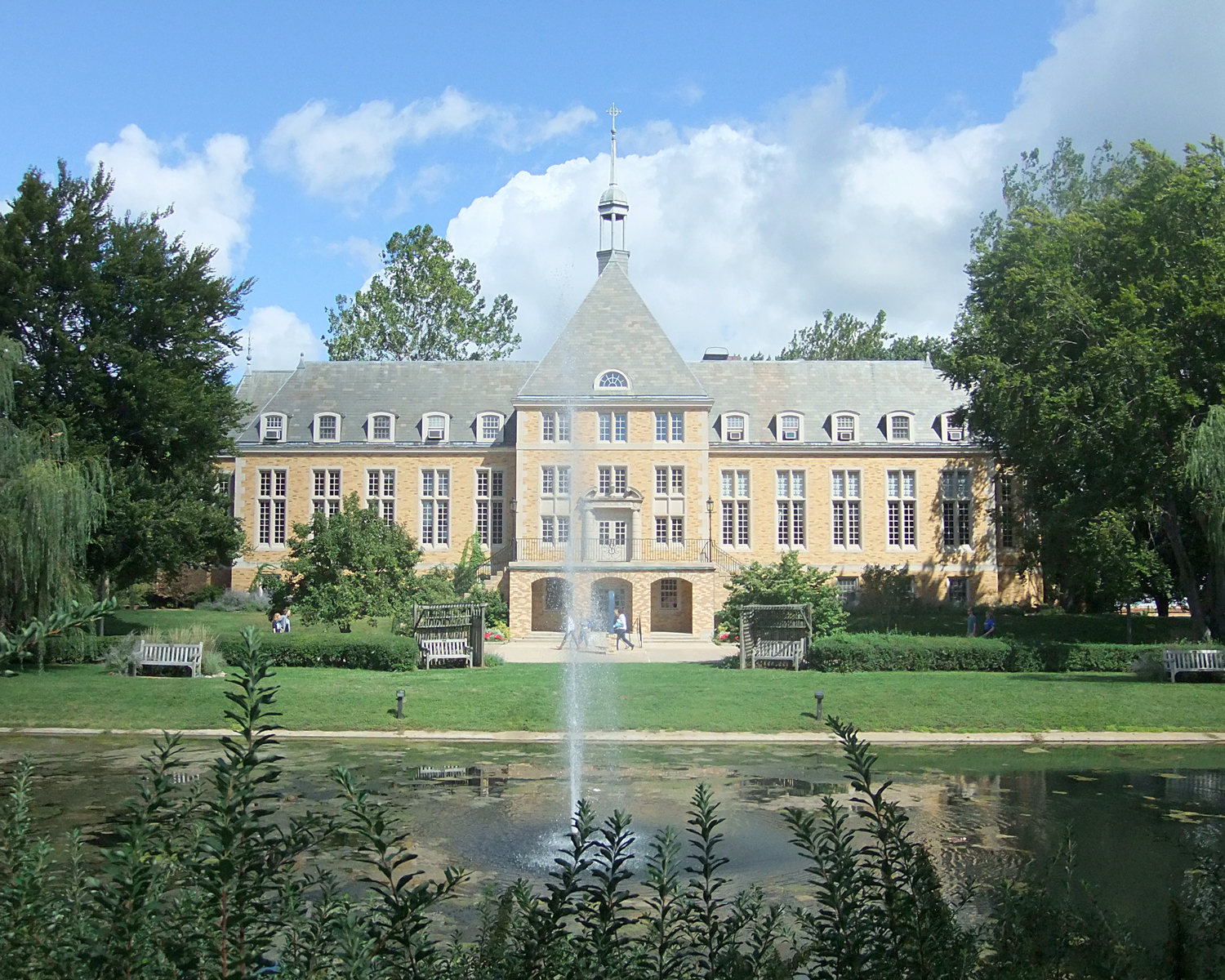
Haggar College Center as viewed from the island on Lake Marian on the Saint Mary's College campus

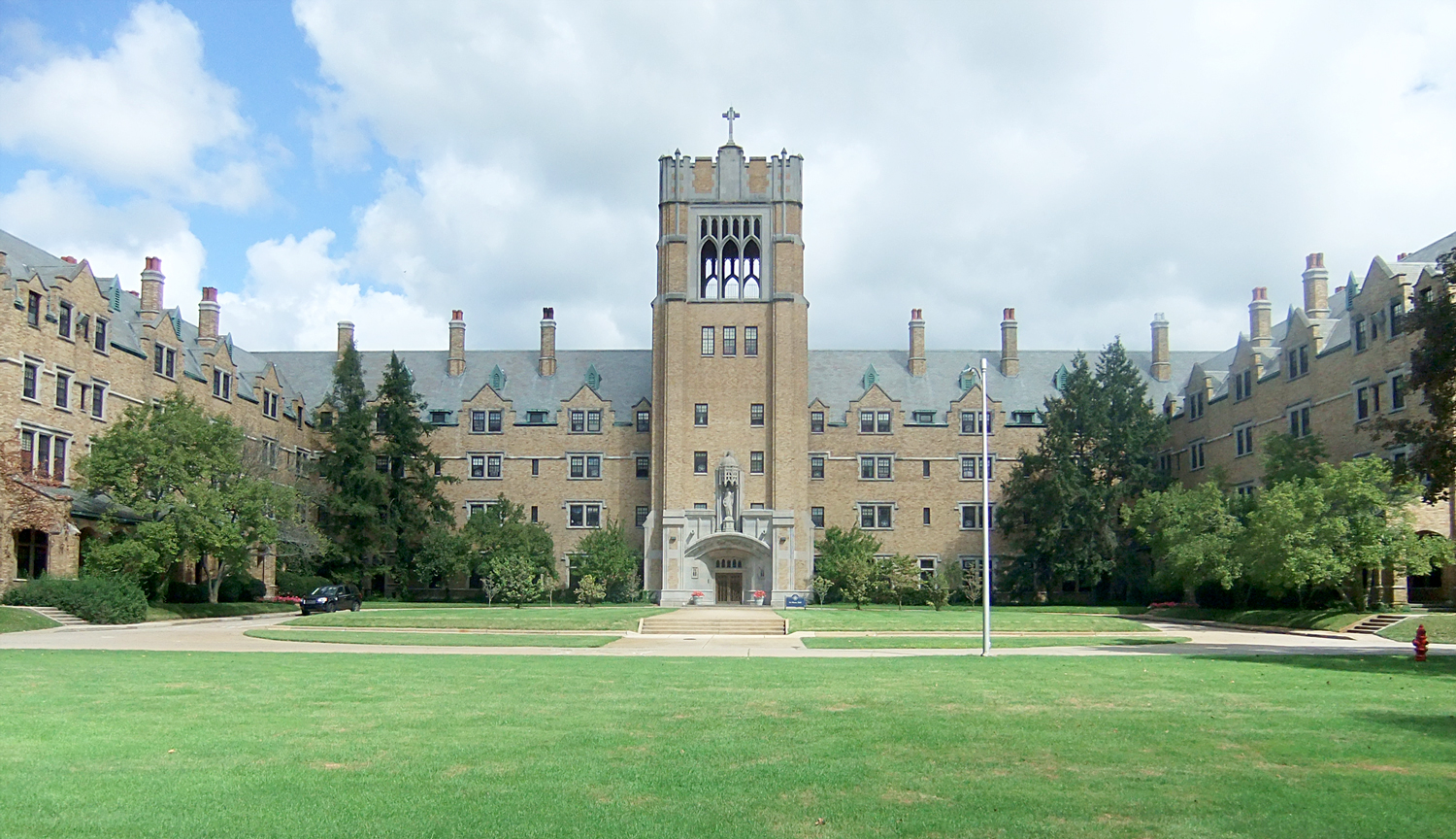
Le Mans Hall residence hall

The 278-acre (1.13 km^{2}) campus features buildings in a variety of architectural styles and periods. Highlights include the Le Mans and Holy Cross Halls. Dedicated in 1926, Le Mans Hall is the second oldest building on campus and serves as the administration building and a residence hall. Holy Cross Hall, also a residence hall, was dedicated in 1906 and is the oldest building on campus.

The Angela Athletic Facility houses tennis, basketball, and volleyball courts in a gym area with seating for 2,000. Racquetball courts and space for gymnastics and for fencing are adjacent to the main gym. Architect Helmut Jahn designed the building. The building was dedicated in 1977 and is named for Mother Angela Gillespie, CSC, the first American to head Saint Mary's Academy, which became Saint Mary's College. Mother Angela oversaw the school moving from Bertrand Township, Michigan, to its present location in 1855. It was dedicated in May 1892 and razed in 1975. Angela was renovated and completely remodeled in 2017.

Cushwa-Leighton Library, designed by architect Evans Woollen III, was dedicated in 1982 and is named for Margaret Hall Cushwa and Mary Lou Morris Leighton. The four-story, 78,000-square-foot (7,200 m^{2})-square-foot building blends modern and Gothic styles and serves as a key campus landmark. It features study areas, library stacks at its core, and a decorative tower housing offices and meeting rooms. With seating for over 540, the library offers access to 268,000+ books, 900+ periodicals, and electronic resources. The lower-level houses the Huisking Instructional Technology Center, and since 2016, it has also hosted ResNet, the Writing & Tutoring Center, Accessibility Resources, and the Student Success Program, creating a campus learning commons.

== Madeleva lecture ==
The college hosts a lecture series named after Madeleva Wolff who served as the college's third president, to honor her establishment in 1943 of a School of Sacred Theology (since closed) that provided the first opportunity in the U.S. for women to pursue graduate studies in theology. The lecture series highlights the work of women in theology. In 2000, the lecturers to that date were invited back to campus to compose a "Charter for Women of Faith in the New Millennium." Instead, they produced The Madeleva Manifesto: A Message of Hope and Courage.

== Athletics ==
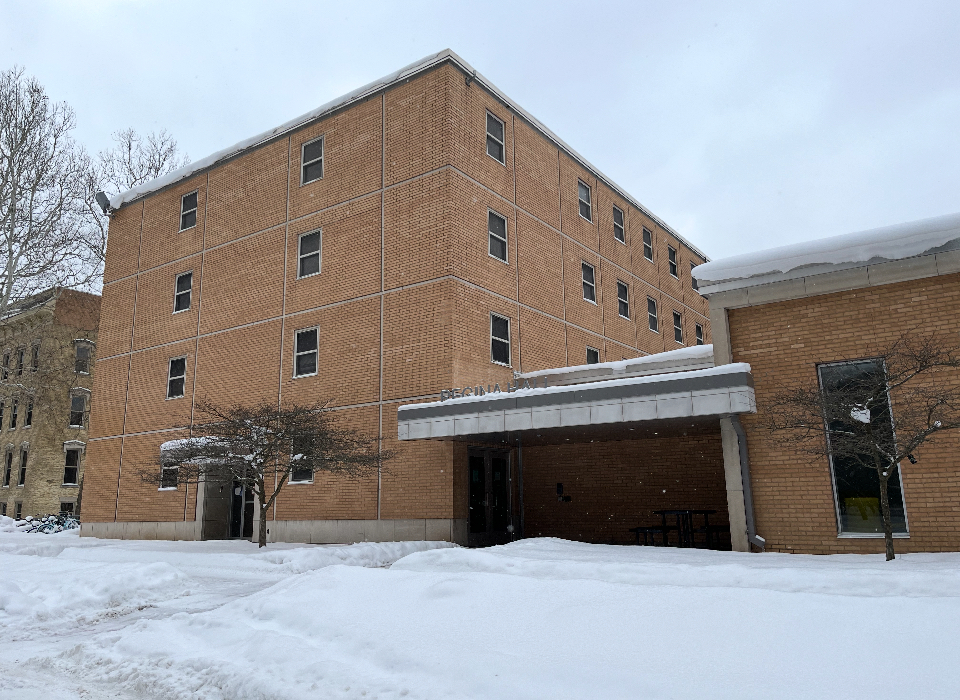
Saint Mary's Regina Hall

The college, an NCAA Division III school, and a member of the Michigan Intercollegiate Athletic Association, sponsors eight varsity teams: tennis, volleyball, soccer, basketball, lacrosse, golf, softball, and cross country.

Saint Mary's women also may participate in the intramural program and/or clubs in a variety of sports. Its club sports program offers recreational opportunities through competition and instruction. The clubs are open to all Saint Mary's students, although membership requirements vary with each club. Many offerings are coeducational with the University of Notre Dame. Saint Mary's sponsored clubs are cheerleading, dance, and volleyball teams. Other clubs co-sponsored with the University of Notre Dame are equestrian, figure skating, gymnastics, skiing, water polo, field hockey, ice hockey, Ultimate, and cycling.

Angela Athletic Facility expands opportunities for campus-wide recreation activities. Indoor facilities include basketball/volleyball, and a fitness center with treadmills, stairmasters, spin bikes, and Cybex weight machines. Outdoor facilities include a six-court outdoor tennis facility; softball, lacrosse and soccer fields; volleyball and basketball courts, areas for cross-country skiing, and a nature trail for hiking or jogging.

The Saint Mary's College athletic mascots are the Belles. In 1975, Saint Mary's began to form intercollegiate varsity sports. They did not, however, begin 'playing' until 1977 when the tennis team played to an 8-1 NAIA match victory. It was there that the college competitors unveiled new team T-shirts with "Belles" emblazoned across the front.

== Notable people ==
=== Faculty ===
- Richard Aaker Trythall, Rome campus
- John Brademas, 1956–1958
- Leo Podolsky, 18 years
- Cyriac Pullapilly, founder of the Semester Around the World Program
- Sister Miriam Joseph Rauh, CSC, 1931–1960
- Barbara Blondeau
- Daniel Horan

=== Alumnae ===
- Mary Ellen Quinlan O'Neill (1872–1875), mother of playwright Eugene O'Neill
- Mary Fels (1880), philanthropist, suffragist, Georgist
- Mary Daly (1953, PhD), feminist scholar and former professor at Boston College
- Eddie Bernice Johnson (1955, Nursing certificate), congresswoman from Texas (1993–2023)
- Helen Klanderud (1959, BA), mayor of Aspen, Colorado (2001–2007)
- Maryanne Wolf (1969, BA), neuroscientist
- Denise DeBartolo York (1972, BA), businesswoman, owner of the San Francisco 49ers
- Pamela Gaye Walker (1979), actress, writer, director
- Catherine Hicks (1973, BA), actress and star of 7th Heaven
- Nora Barry Fischer (1973, BA), U.S. federal judge
- Adriana Trigiani (1981, BA), author
- Jill Tiefenthaler (1987, BA), CEO of National Geographic Society, president of Colorado College (2011–2020)
- Kristin Crowley (1993, BS) Chief of Los Angeles Fire Department (2022–2025)
- London Lamar, (2013, BA) Tennessee state senator
