= Francis A. Sullivan =

American Catholic theologian and Jesuit priest (1922–2019)

The Reverend Father Francis A. Sullivan, SJ

Orders
- Ordination: 1951

Personal details
- Born: May 21, 1922 Boston, Massachusetts, U.S.
- Died: October 23, 2019 (aged 97) Weston, Massachusetts, U.S.
- Denomination: Roman Catholic
- Parents: George Edward Sullivan & Bessie Peterson
- Occupation: Catholic priest
- Profession: Professor, theologian, ecclesiologist, academic dean
- Education: Boston College (B.A.), 1944; (M.A.), 1945; Fordham University (M.A.), 1948; Weston College (S.T.L.), 1952; Pontifical Gregorian University (S.T.D.), 1956

Francis A. Sullivan
- Writing career
- Subjects: Ecclesiology, Theology, Patristics, Christology, Charismatic Movement, Religious pluralism
- Notable works: Charisms and Charismatic Renewal, Magisterium, Salvation Outside the Church?
- Notable awards: John Courtney Murray Award

Francis Alfred Sullivan SJ (May 21, 1922 – October 23, 2019) was an American Catholic theologian and a Jesuit priest, best known for his research in the area of ecclesiology and the magisterium.

== Early life and Jesuit formation ==
Francis "Frank" A. Sullivan was born in Boston on May 21, 1922, to George Edward and Bessie [Peterson] Sullivan, the second of four boys. (Contrary to his general bibliographical representation, his middle name is Alfred, not Aloysius. Another Jesuit, a classicist by the name of Francis Aloysius Sullivan, had already published his own work by the time Sullivan produced his own books. When Sullivan's Magisterium was submitted to the Library of Congress, they mistakenly identified him with this other Francis Sullivan, and assigned him that middle name, a circumstance to which he was ruefully resigned.)

Raised in an actively Catholic household, Sullivan became interested in the possibility of life as a Jesuit and as a teacher through the influence of Jesuit instructors he admired at Boston College High School, as well as his uncle Louis Sullivan, a Jesuit teaching at what was then known as Weston College (now the Boston College School of Theology and Ministry). Because Sullivan had been passed up two grades early in his education, he finished at Boston College High School when he was barely 16 years old, and immediately entered the Jesuit novitiate in 1938, which then allowed entry as early as the age of 15.

The Jesuits' novitiate at that time was in the donated Berkshire Cottage known as Shadowbrook in Lenox, Massachusetts. The novitiate was devoted to spiritual instruction and development, concentrating on instruction in the tradition of the Society of Jesus and its spirituality, and being guided through the full, month-long experience of Ignatius of Loyola's Spiritual Exercises. The way Jesuit formation was structured at the time, the novitiate was followed by the juniorate, devoted to two years of classical studies, equivalent to the first two years of undergraduate education. This was followed by two years of studying philosophy at Weston College, in a program tied to, and very similar to, the classical B.A. at Boston College. Sullivan was awarded his B.A. from Boston College in the spring of 1944. Then after a further third year of philosophy at Weston, he received a master's degree in philosophy from Boston College in 1945.

Sullivan was now 23 years old, and was close to reaching his original goal of teaching high school. All Jesuits-in-training taught high school for three years as a matter of course during their formation, in what was called their Regency. Sullivan served for two years teaching high school Latin, English, and Algebra to the students in Fairfield, Connecticut, where the Jesuits had just recently opened Fairfield College Preparatory School in 1942. Sullivan's Regency was cut short because his superior, John J. McEleney, had decided to prepare Sullivan for study in Patristics, with an eye toward his becoming a professor back at Weston College. He was therefore sent in 1947 to Fordham University in the Bronx for graduate work in Classics instead of the normal third year of teaching. With the possibility of becoming a teacher of Patristics before him, he wrote his Master's thesis on Clement of Alexandria's attitude toward Greek philosophy, and took his M.A. in 1948.

Sullivan then returned to Weston College to study theology for four years, leading to his priestly ordination in 1951, after the third year of theology had been completed. A fourth and final year of theology was then completed. Studying theology was a new experience for Sullivan, notably distinct from the classics focus of his education to this point, and was much more interesting as a subject matter to Sullivan than philosophy. His theological coursework was completed in 1952, and Father Sullivan was awarded the S.T.L. – the Sacrae Theologiae Licentiatus or Licentiate of Sacred Theology, which is the middle degree in the pontifical university system – by Weston College at the age of 30. He then took a break from his academic preparations for his "Tertianship," the final year of Jesuit spiritual formation leading to the Jesuit Final Vows, which Sullivan did at a house the Jesuits had in Pomfret, Connecticut.

== Doctoral studies in Rome ==
After completing his Jesuit formation in 1953, Sullivan was sent abroad for his doctoral studies to the Jesuit's first and central university, founded by Ignatius of Loyola himself in 1551, the Pontifical Gregorian University in Rome. This was his first time travelling overseas. The new Provincial Superior who had sent Sullivan off was William E. Fitzgerald, who was perhaps unaware of Fr. McEleney's previous intention for Sullivan to teach Patristics, since Fitzgerald told him that he would be returning to Weston to teach the part of the Fundamental Theology course dealing with Revelation. He made his way to Rome via Normandy, Paris and Lourdes with a group of Jesuit students.

Sullivan began to have a sense of his path becoming distinctive, because being sent abroad to the Gregorian for his doctoral work was his first major departure from the routine of regular Jesuit formation. Nevertheless, the shift in focus toward a goal of teaching Fundamental Theology and Revelation was less exciting for Sullivan, who would have preferred to carry on with the original idea of being a Patristics scholar, little knowing that he would actually end up in the field of Ecclesiology. At the Gregorian, Sullivan studied with two Ecclesiologists: the Dutch Sebastiaan Tromp and the Spaniard Timoteo Zapelena. Although he was in fact a Patristics scholar, Tromp was teaching the Theology of Revelation at the Gregorian. Ecclesiology at the time was centered on the text Mystici corporis Christi (often simply called Mystici corporis), the encyclical promulgated by Pope Pius XII on 29 June 1943, and Tromp was widely thought to have participated in the authoring of the text with the Pope. For all this ecclesiological work, Tromp was not the professor of Ecclesiology: that post was held by Zapelena. Sullivan noted that Zapelena held to a number of different points than were put forth in Mystici corporis, and in that way began to experience the diversity of ecclesiological positions possible as demonstrated by his own teachers.

For his dissertation, Sullivan did not find a subject in the field of Fundamental Theology that caught his attention at the time, and so he drew on his already-existing interest in Patristics. He focused on Theodore of Mopsuestia's Christology, since it was sufficient that Sullivan had prepared in his coursework to be able to teach Fundamental Theology upon his return to Weston: the choice of subject for the project was not bound in any way to that destiny which his Superior had designated for him. Discovering that professors at either the Biblical Institute or the Oriental Institute could direct dissertations at the Gregorian, Sullivan wrote under the direction of Fr. Ignacio Ortiz de Urbina at the Oriental Institute, who had written on Theodore. Sullivan finished his task in 1955, but since his dissertation, The Christology of Theodore of Mopsuestia, was not published until 1956, that is the date his degree was actually awarded. Having finished the work for the S.T.D. – the Sacrae Theologiae Doctor or Doctor of Sacred Theology, which is the final degree in the pontifical university system – Sullivan set off for Boston.

He was taking some of the summer to see more of Europe, as he did not have to be in Boston until August 1955, when he would also profess his Final Vows as a Jesuit. He was at the Jesuit house in Barcelona when an American friend arrived who surprised Sullivan with the news that Sullivan's assignment had changed: instead of teaching Fundamental Theology in Boston, he was listed as being assigned to Rome, although his friend knew nothing more than that. Sullivan wrote to his Superior, Fr. Fitzgerald and discovered that he had been tapped to teach Ecclesiology back at the Gregorian. Zapelena was approaching the mandatory retirement age of 75 and his health was declining. Afraid of a sudden gap in their faculty, the combination of Sullivan's availability and education was seized upon by the Gregorian University to guarantee that their program could continue uninterrupted. After a visit home, and feeling more than a little exiled, Sullivan returned to Rome to teach Ecclesiology at the Gregorian University, an academic ministry in which he would serve for the next 36 years, until his own mandatory retirement at the age of 70 in 1992.

== Academic ministry ==
From 1956 until 1992, Sullivan was professor of ecclesiology at the Gregorian University, serving as dean from 1964 to 1970. Having been assigned to Rome unexpectedly, he received permission to take the fall semester of 1955 off, finishing work for the publication of his doctoral dissertation in Boston, and remaining close to his father, who was dying of lung cancer. Then in early 1956 he began to step into Fr. Timothy Zapelena's role as professor of Ecclesiology. Zapelena did not end up leaving the Gregorian immediately, and the two of them were both present during the 1955–56 school year. Sullivan began his work still using the book Zapelena had already prepared for his own Ecclesiology course. Zapelena had been teaching a two-semester course for many years, and since he was healthy enough to continue teaching for a little while longer, over the next two years, 1956–58, he and Sullivan split the course as it had been structured, with Sullivan teaching the first semester material and Zapelena teaching the second semester material. Sullivan assumed the full responsibility for the subject in 1958 and the first book derived from the course, De Ecclesia, was published in 1962. This was intended to be the first part of a two-volume work on the Church, but the advent of the Second Vatican Council disrupted those plans.

The Second Vatican Council re-articulated the theology of the Church so that the subject as Sullivan had been teaching it, largely based on Mystici corporis, was no longer adequate to the subject. Nor were professors any longer expected simply to publish Latin versions of their class notes as books. Sullivan had not been called to the council as a peritus, which was not surprising given that he was still quite a junior faculty member. Information as to the council's proceedings were kept quiet until published. However, much rumor had to say. Nevertheless, Sullivan was given access to one critical Vatican II document, the draft form of Lumen gentium, the Dogmatic Constitution on the Church. This happened when he was asked to address the American bishops on the topic of charisms, a concept found in Saint Paul, particularly in his descriptions of the Church in the First Epistle to the Corinthians, but which had fallen out of use in Catholic theological circles. Sullivan's research on this idea, as given in his presentation, was then offered to the council as a correction and advance upon the draft version by Sullivan's former Superior, John J. McEleney, who was now Archbishop of Kingston, Jamaica. In this way, Sullivan's theological work on charisms became part of the second paragraph of Lumen gentium 12. This theological preparation would have significant impact later in Sullivan's thought when he encountered the Catholic Charismatic Renewal.

Sullivan was named dean of the Faculty of Theology at the Gregorian University from 1964 to 1970, and it fell to him to revise the statutes of the university according to the norms put forward by the Congregation for Seminaries and Universities (now the Congregation for Catholic Education). While this extra work – without the assistance of a staff – was a great burden, Sullivan did restructure the faculty so that they were better able to conduct research as well as teach: for the first time having regular sabbaticals toward that end.

A number of prominent Catholic ecclesiologists have worked with or studied under Sullivan. Sullivan was on the dissertation committee of Avery Cardinal Dulles. Joseph Komonchak and Richard McBrien were also his students. William Cardinal Levada, formerly the Prefect of the Congregation of the Doctrine of the Faith, received his doctorate under Sullivan in 1971.

From 1992, Sullivan continued to teach graduate students as a professor of theology at Boston College. Only after the spring semester of 2009, when he turned 87, did Sullivan finally retire from teaching.

== Disputed questions ==
As an actively researching theologian, Sullivan was a participant in a number of ongoing discussions and investigations of matters in dispute in the theological world. In response to the production of Hans Küng's controversial book Infallible? An Inquiry, Sullivan was provoked into thinking through a defense of the idea of the magisterium – the teaching authority in the Church – which eventually became his book Magisterium: Teaching Authority in the Catholic Church, published in 1983.

In December 1995, he questioned the assertion of the Congregation for the Doctrine of the Faith that the teaching reiterated in Ordinatio sacerdotalis regarding women's ordination had been infallibly taught. Sullivan wrote that "The question that remains is whether it is a clearly established fact that the bishops of the Catholic Church are as convinced by those reasons [against women priests] as Pope John Paul evidently is, and that, in exercising their proper role as judges and teachers of the faith, they have been unanimous in teaching that the exclusion of women from ordination to the priesthood is a divinely revealed truth to which all Catholics are obliged to give a definitive assent of faith. Unless this is manifestly the case, I do not see how it can be certain that this doctrine is taught infallibly by the ordinary and universal magisterium."

Sullivan also engaged in a number of long-running discussions over disputed questions, which extended across several years of Sullivan's retirement. With Germain Grisez he discussed the question of the infallibility of the Catholic Church's teaching on artificial contraception; with Adrian Gariuit, O.F.M., he argued the question of "dissent" within the Church; with Lawrence J. Welch, he engaged in a long conversation in theological journals about consensus among theologians as a criterion by which it could be determined whether a doctrine was taught universally by the Church; and with Karl Becker, S.J., he debated the meaning of what the Second Vatican Council meant by saying that the Church of Christ "subsisted in" the Roman Catholic Church.

== Honors ==
In 1994, Sullivan received the John Courtney Murray Award, the chief honor given by the Catholic Theological Society of America, for his achievements, particularly in the field of ecclesiology.

On 19 May 2012, the Jesuit School of Theology of Santa Clara University awarded Sullivan an honorary Doctor of Divinity degree, citing him for his accessible writing, his contributions to the charismatic and ecumenical movements, his steadfast defense of the Second Vatican Council, his exemplary life of scholarship and faith, and his generosity and availability to all students and inquirers.

== Bibliography ==
- The Christology of Theodore of Mopsuestia, 1956
- De ecclesia, I: quaestiones theologiae fundamentalis, 1962
- Charisms and Charismatic Renewal: A Biblical and Theological Study, 1982
- On Making the Spiritual Exercises for the Renewal of Jesuit Charisms, 1983 (with Robert L. Faricy, S.J.)
- Magisterium: Teaching Authority in the Catholic Church, 1983
- The Church We Believe In: One, Holy, Catholic and Apostolic, 1988
- Salvation Outside the Church? Tracing the History of the Catholic Response 1992
- Creative Fidelity: Weighing and Interpreting Documents of the Magisterium, 1996
- From Apostles to Bishops: The Development of the Episcopacy in the Early Church, 2001
- Frequent contributions to Theological Studies
