= John Courtney Murray Award =

Honor bestowed by the Catholic Theological Society of America

The John Courtney Murray Award is the highest honor bestowed by the Catholic Theological Society of America, named after John Courtney Murray, the great American theologian known for his work on religious liberty.

== Winners ==
- 2026: Bryan Massingale
- 2025: Stephen B. Bevans, S.V.D.
- 2024: Mary Catherine Hilkert, O.P.
- 2023: Roger Haight, S.J.
- 2022: Daniel K. Finn
- 2021: Susan K. Wood, S.C.L
- 2019: James F. Keenan, S.J.
- 2018: M. Shawn Copeland
- 2017: Francis Xavier Clooney, S.J.
- 2016: Orlando O. Espín
- 2015: Joseph A. Komonchak
- 2014: John T. Pawlikowski, O.S.M.
- 2013: Anne E. Patrick, S.N.J.M.
- 2012: Terrence W. Tilley
- 2011: James A. Coriden
- 2010: Peter C. Phan
- 2009: David Bakewell Burrell, C.S.C
- 2008: Lisa Sowle Cahill
- 2007: Virgilio Elizondo
- 2006: Sandra M. Schneiders, I.H.M.
- 2005: Robert Schreiter, C.PP.S.
- 2004: Elizabeth A. Johnson, C.S.J.
- 2003: Michael A. Fahey, S.J.
- 2002: Kenan Osborne, O.F.M.
- 2001: Agnes Cunningham, S.S.C.M.
- 2000: Michael J. Buckley, S.J.
- 1999: Ladislas Orsy, S.J.
- 1998: David Hollenbach, S.J.
- 1997: Anne Carr, B.V.M.
- 1996: David N. Power, O.M.I.
- 1995: John T. & Denise Carmody
- 1994: Francis A. Sullivan, S.J.
- 1993: Kilian P. McDonnell, O.S.B.
- 1992: Margaret A. Farley, R.S.M.
- 1991: Thomas F. O’Meara, O.P.
- 1990: Frederick R. McManus
- 1989: Patrick Granfield, O.S.B.
- 1988: The Most Rev. Richard J. Sklba
- 1987: Walter H. Principe, C.S.B.
- 1986: Gregory Baum
- 1985: Zachary J. Hayes, O.F.M.
- 1984: Monika Hellwig
- 1983: William J. Hill, O.P.
- 1982: George J. Dyer
- 1981: Gerard S. Sloyan
- 1980: David W. Tracy
- 1979: Bernard Cooke
- 1978: Edward Kilmartin, S.J.
- 1977: Frederick E. Crowe, S.J.
- 1976: Richard. P. McBrien
- 1975: Carl J. Peter
- 1974: George H. Tavard, A.A.
- 1973: Bernard J.F. Lonergan, S.J.
- 1972: Charles E. Curran

== See also ==
- List of ecclesiastical decorations
