= Lisa Sowle Cahill =

American ethicist and academic

Lisa Sowle Cahill is an American ethicist, and J. Donald Monan Professor at Boston College. She first became known in the 1980s with her studies on gender and sexual ethics, and now she has extended her work to social and global ethics. Lisa Sowle Cahill's work focuses on an attempt to discuss the complexity of moral issues while lowering tensions about theological disagreements between the Church and society.

== Education ==
In 1970, Cahill received a B.A. in theology from Santa Clara University. She then went on to receive her M.A. and Ph.D. from the University of Chicago Divinity School. She completed her dissertation in 1976 under the guidance of James Gustafson. James Gustafson introduced her to Richard McCormick SJ and Father Charles Curran, both of whom have influenced her career in moral theology. She has taught at Boston College since 1976 and has been a visiting scholar at the Kennedy Institute of Ethics, Georgetown University, and a visiting professor of Catholic theology at Yale University.

== Career ==
Sometimes called a feminist theologian and sometimes a bioethicist, Cahill has published over two hundred articles and has worked on as many as fifteen books. She is a member of the American Academy of Arts and Sciences and was president of the Catholic Theological Society of America from 1992 to1993. In 2008 she was awarded the John Courtney Murray Award by the Catholic Theological Society of America. In 2024, she was awarded the Ann O'Hara Graff award.

Cahill’s influence on moral theology has been extended through the work of her graduate students. Seventeen of her doctoral students contributed to the 2020 festschrift published in her honor—Reimagining the Moral Life: On Lisa Sowle Cahill’s Contributions to Christian Ethics. This included contributions from 17 of her doctoral students.

== Works ==
- Global Justice, Christology and Christian Ethics, Cambridge University Press, 2013
- Bioethics and the Common Good, Marquette University Press, 2005
- Genetics, Theology, Ethics: An Interdisciplinary Conversation, Crossroad Publishing Company, 2005
- "Commentary on Familiarius consortio". Modern Catholic Social Teaching: Commentaries and Interpretations. Georgetown University Press. 2005. ISBN 9781589010536.
- Theological Bioethics: Participation, Justice, and Change. Georgetown University Press. 2005. ISBN 9781589010758.
- Family: a Christian social perspective, Fortress Press, 2000, ISBN 9780800632526
- Sex, Gender, and Christian Ethics. Cambridge University Press. 1996. ISBN 9780521578486. "Lisa Sowle Cahill."
- Love Your Enemies: Discipleship, Pacifism, and Just War Theory. Fortress Press. 1994. ISBN 9780800627003.
- 'Just Love,' Reviewed. https://www.americamagazine.org/issue/100/just-love-reviewed October 7, 2012, America Magazine
