= Anne E. Patrick =

American Catholic theologian

Anne Estelle Patrick SNJM
- Born: April 5, 1941; Washington, DC, U.S.
- Died: July 21, 2016 (aged 75); Silver Spring, Maryland, U.S.
- Occupations: Educator, Theologian

Anne Estelle Patrick, SNJM (April 5, 1941 – July 21, 2016), was an American Catholic religious sister, theologian, and professor. She was an active member of the Catholic Theological Society of America, the International Network of Societies for Catholic Theology, the Society of Christian Ethics, and the National Assembly of Women Religious.

== Early life ==
Patrick, the eldest of six sisters, was born on April 5, 1941, in Washington, DC. Growing up, she was raised in Silver Spring, Maryland where she would enter the Sisters of the Holy Names of Jesus and Mary in 1958 to become a sister.

== Education ==
Patrick received her early education from Sisters of the Holy Names of Jesus and Mary in Silver Spring, Maryland. In 1969 she earned her bachelor's degree in English at Medaille College. Patrick would later receive her master's degree at the University of Maryland, and in 1982, receive her Ph.D. at the University of Chicago.

== Academic career ==
Patrick's work in the education field started in 1960 when she began to teach music, English, and religion at Holy Names academies in Tampa, Albany (NY), and Silver Spring, Maryland until 1973. In 1980 she became William H. Laird Professor of Religion and the Liberal Arts, emerita, at Carleton College located in Northfield, Minnesota. During her time as a professor, she taught courses on Roman Catholic traditions, religion and literature, Christian ethics, and feminist and liberation theologies until she retired in 2009. Patrick was the first woman to receive tenure in the Religion Department at Carleton. While at Carleton, Patrick also chaired the Department of Religion during 1986–1991 and 2000–2003.

== Religious involvement ==
Patrick was not only a member of the Sisters of the Holy Names of Jesus and Mary, but she was also a president of the Catholic Theological Society of America and a founding vice-president of the International Network of Societies for Catholic Theology. In addition, she was also elected to the board of the Society of Christian Ethics while simultaneously serving as both editor for the Religious Book Club and an editorial consultant for various journals and publishers. Patrick was also a chair of the Committee on Women in Church and the Society of the National Assembly of Women Religious. In 1975, during her time as a chair, she represented an umbrella group of U.S. women religious, Sisters Uniting, at the International Women's Year Tribune in Mexico City as well as assisted in early planning for the Women's Ordination Conference in Detroit.

== Awards and accomplishments ==
In 2009 Patrick was given the Ann O' Hara Graff Award from the CTSA Women's Consultation in Constructive Theology. On June 5 of that same year, she gave the Honors Convocation address as part of her celebratory retirement events with a talk, which she titled “On Being Unfinished (De Imperfectione).” Also in 2009, she gave the Madeleva Lecture at St. Mary's College (Indiana). In 2013, after having been chosen as the recipient, Patrick received yet another award from the CTSA, the John Courtney Murray Award. In February 2016 Patrick presented at the conference on conscience and Catholic health care – “The Rhetoric of Conscience: Co-optation, Conversion, and Catholic Health Care,” at Santa Clara University's Markkula Center for Applied Ethics.

== Selected writings ==
- Liberating Conscience: Feminist Explorations in Catholic Moral Theology, New York, 1997, Bloomsbury Academic. ISBN 9780826410511
- Women, Conscience, and the Creative Process, Mahwah, New Jersey, 2011, Paulist Press. ISBN 9780809147069
- Conscience and Calling: Ethical Reflections on Catholic Women's Church Vocations, New York, 2013, Bloomsbury Academic. ISBN 9781441144522
- On Being Unfinished, Maryknoll, New York, 2017, Orbis Press. ISBN 9781626982550
