= David Hollenbach =

American Jesuit and academic (born 1942)

David Hollenbach S.J.
- Born: 6 October 1942 (age 83)
- Education: St. Joseph's University
- Known for: His work on Economic Justice for All, The Common Good and Christian Ethics
- Awards: 1996 Fulbright Fellowship (for research & teaching in Kenya), 2009 Marianist Award (University of Dayton) John Courtney Murray Award for Distinguished Achievement in Theology (Catholic Theological Society of America)
- Scientific career
- Fields: Human Rights and International Justice
- Workplaces: Georgetown University, Weston School of Theology, Catholic University of Eastern Africa, Boston College

Rev. David Hollenbach, S.J. (born October 6, 1942, in Philadelphia, PA.) is a Jesuit priest, professor, author, and moral theologian currently serving as the Pedro Arrupe Distinguished Research Professor of the Walsh School of Foreign Service at Georgetown University. He is a consultant to the Jesuit Refugee Service and is the recipient of the John Courtney Murray Award from the Catholic Theological Society of America in 1998.

== Education, career, and influences ==
Hollenbach received his B.S. in physics from St. Joseph's University in Philadelphia, Pennsylvania, in 1964 and joined the Society of Jesus upon graduation. After completing his novitiate, He earned a M.A. and Licentiate in Philosophy (Ph.L.) from Saint Louis University in 1968. After serving as an instructor in philosophy at Georgetown University in Washington, DC during the 1968–1969 academic year, he completed his M.Div. at Woodstock College and was ordained a priest on June 5, 1971. After ordination he earned a Ph.D. in religious ethics from Yale University in 1975.

After working as a research fellow during the 1975–1976 academic year at the Woodstock Theological Center at Georgetown University, Fr. Hollenbach began his career at as a professor of moral theology at the Weston School of Theology in Cambridge, MA. In 1991 he was appointed professor of theology at Boston College and was subsequently appointed the University Chair in Human Rights and International Justice and the Director of the Center for Human Rights and International Justice at the same institution in 2005. In 2016, Hollenbach became the Pedro Arrupe Distinguished Service Professor in the Walsh School of Foreign Service at Georgetown University, where he currently teaches.

Until November 2009, Hollenbach held several positions in the Catholic University of Eastern Africa's Hekima University College in Nairobi, Kenya. He has also taught at The Jesuit Philosophy Institute in Ho Chi Minh City, Vietnam, and the East Asian Pastoral Institute in Manila, Philippines. In 2015, he held the Cary and Ann Maguire Chair in Ethics and American History at the John W. Kluge Center for Scholars at the Library of Congress.

Hollenbach draws from many theologians, including Augustine, Thomas Aquinas, and Jacques Maritain.

Hollenbach is considered by many experts in Christian ethics to be the principal contributor to Economic Justice for All: Pastoral Letter on Catholic Social Teaching and the U.S. Economy.

== Works ==
=== The Common Good and Christian Ethics ===
Written in 2002, this book has become one of Hollenbach's most famous works as an author. While in this book Hollenbach does look to his major influences such as Aquinas for inspiration, it mainly focuses on Hollenbach's attempt to define the "common good" and find what contrasts this good. Building on his earlier writings, Hollenbach emphasizes relationships as being the source of the common good. There are certain goods that Hollenbach states are essential for modern day democracies to be successful. These goods include mutual respect, self-determination, and individual agency. Hollenbach points out that these essential goods are completely social and depend solely on human interaction. Ultimately this book is a study on how we as humans relate with one another and what we need to do to better our relationships with one another. Some points of interest that Hollenbach discusses are racism and marginalization.

== Partial bibliography ==
- Claims in Conflict: Retrieving and Renewing the Catholic Human Rights Tradition. (1979)
- Nuclear Ethics: A Christian Moral Argument (1983)
- Justice, Peace, and Human Rights: American Catholic Social Ethics in a Pluralistic World (1990)
- Catholicism and Liberalism: Contributions to American Public Philosophy (With R. Bruce Douglass)(1994)
- The Common Good and Christian Ethics (2002)
- The Global Face of Public Faith: Politics, Human Rights, and Christian Ethics (2003)
- Modern Catholic Social Teaching: Commentaries and Interpretations (2005)
- Refugee Rights: Ethics Advocacy, and Africa (2008)
- Driven from Home: Protecting the Rights of Forced Migrants (2010)

== See also ==
- Gary Chartier
- John Courtney Murray Award
- Society of Jesus
