= Kenneth R. Himes =

American Roman Catholic theologian (born 1950)

Kenneth R. Himes (born 1950) is an American Roman Catholic theologian, currently teaching at Boston College. His most recent book is the coedited work, with Conor M. Kelly, Poverty: Responding Like Jesus.

== Personal life ==
Kenneth Himes was born on July 2, 1950, in Brooklyn, New York. He became a member of the Order of Friars Minor in August 1975. He was ordained to the priesthood of the Roman Catholic Church in May 1976. He went to Siena College graduating in 1971 receiving a B.A in history. He then went on to earn a M.A in theology from the Washington Theological Union in 1975. He finished his education at Duke University receiving a PhD in religion and public policy in 1981.

== Professional career ==
Ken Himes currently holds the position of associate professor in the department of theology at Boston College. Previously, he has held a number of positions at the Washington Theological Union, including assistant professor (1980), associate professor (1985), and professor of moral theology (1994). He has also been a visiting professor at University of Virginia, Howard University Divinity School and St. John's University.

He has also been a member of the Theological Society of America and the Society of Christian Ethics. He was on the editorial board of the Catholic Social Tradition series and U. of Notre Dame Press. Along with being on the board of consultants for the Center for the Study of Catholic Social Thought at Duquesne University and the editorial board of the Journal of Catholic Social Thought (Villanova University). He was also on board of directors for the Ecclesiastical Faculty of Boston College and a member of the board of trustees at Siena College.

== Theological ideologies and works ==
Kenneth Himes has focused on Catholic social teaching, the role of religion in public life and politics, and the ethics of warfare. He has written and edited a number of books and articles on these subjects. Some of his books include:

- Fullness of Faith: The Public Significance of Theology
- Responses to 101 Questions on Catholic Social Teaching
- Introduction to Christian Ethics: A Reader
- Modern Catholic Social Teaching: Commentaries and Interpretations

He has also published more than 20 articles in scholarly journals and written more than 60 book reviews in popular journals. Some of his articles in journals include:

1. “The Catholic Hierarchy and Nuclear Arms” Forum For Social Economics (Winter 1981/82): 5-23
2. “Deterrence and Disarmament: Ethical Analysis and Pastoral Advice” Cross Currents (Winter 1983/84) 421–431
3. “Scripture and Ethics: a review essay” Biblical Theology Bulletin (April, 1985): 65–73
4. “The Local Church as a Mediating Structure” Social Thought 12 (Winter 1986): 23–30
5. “Social Sin and the Role of the Individual” The Annual of the Society of Christian Ethics (1986): 183–218
6. “The U.S. Catholic Contribution to Moral Theology” New Theology Review 1 (February, 1988): 53–71
7. “Eucharist and Justice: Assessing the Legacy of Virgil Michel” Worship 62 (May, 1988): 201–224
8. “The Relationship of Religion and Morality” Social Thought 15 (Summer-Fall 1989): 33–41
9. “Mixed Reactions: The Reception of Gaudium et Spes” New Theology Review 3 (February, 1990): 5–17
10. "The Morality of Humanitarian Intervention," Theological Studies 55 (March, 1994): 82–105
11. "Pastoral Care of the Divorce and Remarried" Theological Studies 57 (March, 1996): 97-123 (co-author with James A. Coriden)
12. "Financial Stewardship from the Perspective of Catholic Social Teaching" New Theology Review 9 (1996): 52–70
13. "Catholic Health Care: the Common Good, Public Responsibility and the Culture of Profit" New Theology Review 10 (November, 1997): 22–38
14. "Rights of Entitlement: a Roman Catholic Perspective" Notre Dame Journal of Law, Ethics and Public Policy 11 (1997): 507–529
15. "The Crisis of American Democracy: a Catholic perspective" Theology and Public Policy 9 (1997): 16-32 Reprinted in Thomas Massaro and Thomas Shannon, eds., American Catholic Social Teaching (Collegeville, MN: The Liturgical Press, 2002) pp. 184–203.
16. “Prayer and the Moral Life: tracing the connection” Listening 34 (1999): 180–1917.
17. “Morality and Prayer” New Theology Review 13 (November 2000): 72–76
18. “The Religious Rhetoric of Just War” in Return of Just War Concilium 2001 ed. M.P. Aquino Vargas and D. Mieth (London: SCM Press, 2001) pp. 43–51 Reprinted in French, German, Spanish, Italian and Dutch editions
19. “The Challenge of Peace and Economic Justice For All: Reflections Twenty Years Later” in Proceedings of the Catholic Theological Society of America 56 (2001): 77-96 Reprinted in David Stosur, ed. Unfailing Patience and Sound Teaching: Reflections on Episcopal Ministry in Honor of Rembert G.Weakland, O.S.B. Collegeville: Liturgical Press (2003)
20. “Intervention, Just War, and U.S. National Security” Theological Studies 65 (2004): 141–157
21. “The Indissolubility of Marriage: Reasons to Reconsider” Theological Studies 65 (2004): 453-499 (co-author with James Coriden)
22. “Catholic Social Teaching on Peace Since Gaudium et Spes” New Theology Review 18/1 (February, 2005): 36–45
23. “Did John Paul’s Allocution on Life-Sustaining Treatments Revise the Tradition? A Response to Thomas Shannon and James J. Walter” Theological Studies 67 (2006): 163-168 (co-author James Keenan and John Paris)
24. “’Two There Are’: Religion and Politics in a Polarized Society” New Theology Review 19/3 (August, 2006): 5–13
25. “Consumerism and Christian Ethics” Theological Studies 68 (2007): 132-153 26. “Globalization with a Human Face” Theological Studies 69 (2008): 269-289 27. “Ethical Questions on War and Peace” New Theology Review 23/1 (2010): 82-
26. “The United States at War: Taking Stock” Theological Studies 71 (2010): 190–20929.
27. “Torture as an Attack on the Human” Concilium: Human Nature and Natural Law, ed. L. Cahill, H. Hacke, and E. Metogo (2010/3): 118-123 Reprinted in French, German, Spanish, Italian and Dutch editions

He has also won numerous awards for his work:

- Research Grant for Younger Scholars, Association of Theological Schools, 1984-
- Associate editor, New Theology Review, 1987–1992 Faculty Summer Research Grant, Washington Theological Union, 1989 Fellow, Center of Theological Inquiry, Princeton, NJ January–July, 1991 *Third Place Award, Best Article Originating With A Scholarly Journal, Catholic Press Association, 1991 ("The Relationship of Religion and Morality" Social Thought)
- Board of directors, Catholic Theological Society of America, 1992–94; 1998
- First Place Award, Best Theology Book, Catholic Press Association, 1993 (Fullness of Faith, Paulist Press)
- Faculty Summer Research Grant, Washington Theological Union, 1994 Paul McKeever Chair of Moral Theology, St. John's University, Jamaica, NY,1996–97
- Editor, New Theology Review, 1997–2002
- President, Catholic Theological Society of America, 2000–2001
- Distinguished Service Award, Washington Theological Union, 2004
- First Place Award, Best Reference Book, Catholic Press Association, 2006 (Modern Catholic Social Teaching: Commentaries and Interpretations, Georgetown University Press)
