= Elizabeth Johnson (theologian) =

American Roman Catholic theologian

Elizabeth A. Johnson CSJ
- Born: December 6, 1941 (age 84)
- Education: Brentwood College (BS); Manhattan College (MA); Catholic University of America (PhD)
- Occupations: Catholic Woman Religious, Professor Emerita of Theology

Elizabeth A. Johnson CSJ (born December 7, 1941) is a Roman Catholic feminist theologian. She is a Distinguished Professor Emerita of Theology at Fordham University, a Jesuit institution in New York City and a member of the Sisters of St. Joseph of Brentwood. The National Catholic Reporter has called Johnson "one of the country's most prominent and respected theologians."

Johnson has served as president of the Catholic Theological Society of America and is "one of its most well known members." The New York Times has described Johnson as "a highly respected theologian whose books are widely used in theology classes."

Her book Quest for the Living God (2007) became popular in churches and was adopted as a text for many university religion courses, but in 2011 the United States Conference of Catholic Bishops' (USCCB) Committee on Doctrine issued a doctrinal evaluation of the book that concluded it did not correspond with "authentic Catholic teaching." The public criticism by the bishops created "a substantial boon in sales of Quest," and frayed already strained relations between the church hierarchy and Catholic theologians.

The New York Times also notes that Johnson has been criticized by other Catholic groups, such as the conservative educational advocacy group, the Cardinal Newman Society.

== Life ==
Johnson grew up in Brooklyn, New York, the oldest of seven children in an "Irish Catholic family." As a young adult she joined the religious congregation of the Sisters of Saint Joseph whose motherhouse is in Brentwood, Long Island, NY. She received a B.S. from Brentwood College in 1964 and an M.A. from Manhattan College in 1964. Johnson taught science and religion at the elementary and high school level, then taught theology at St. Joseph's College (New York) and at CUA before moving to Fordham in 1991.

In 1981, she became one of the first woman to earn a Ph.D. in theology at the Catholic University of America (CUA). Johnson recalls that her experience there was "rich, respectful, and collegial," but was also "lacking in female presence." During her studies there in the 1970s Johnson observes, "I never had a woman professor, I never read one woman author. There were none to be had. It was a totally male education." CUA attempted to remedy this when Johnson herself was hired for a tenure-track position in Christology. Feminist theologians Elisabeth Schüssler Fiorenza and Sandra M. Schneiders influenced Johnson on feminist topics, including using feminine metaphors and language for God. Inspired by their example, Johnson and other women graduate students formed a group, "Women in Theology."

While at CUA in 1980 she felt profoundly affected by events of the Salvadoran Civil War when four American women, including three nuns, working as missionaries and helping oppressed people to escape violence, were abducted and killed by a death squad. Johnson mourned the women, but she "redirected her anguish by carrying out their mission in her own field of theology."

Johnson notes that leaders of her religious community encouraged her to enter the field of theology and pushed her to continue in spite of obstacles. "When I applied for tenure at Catholic University, I received the full positive vote of the faculty. But the outcome was in doubt because some bishops were not happy with an article I had written," she says, referring to her article questioning the traditional view of Mary as "humble and obedient." Though she contemplated leaving rather than facing the "arduous process of interrogation," General Superior Sister John Raymond McGann advised her not to give up, and Johnson did receive tenure.

At Fordham, she was named Distinguished Professor in 1997 and "Teacher of the Year" in 1998. She has served as head of the Catholic Theological Society of America and the American Theological Society.

== Opinions ==
- In 1990, she criticized a draft of the 1992 Catechism of the Catholic Church for its use of Scripture "in a fundamentalist way, with little regard for insights about the New Testament forged in the last half-century of Catholic biblical renewal," quoting the evangelists as if they all held identical views, and ascribing to them concepts only developed after centuries of theological dispute. She praised the draft for placing Jesus rather than the church at the center of its discussions of worship and ethics, but objected to its "truncated view of the humanity of Jesus Christ" who "walks around like God dressed up in human clothes."
- In 2011, she wrote "All-male images of God are hierarchical images rooted in the unequal relation between women and men [...] Once women no longer relate to men as patriarchal fathers, lords, and kings in society, these images become religiously inadequate. Instead of evoking the reality of God, they block it."
- Jill Raitt, of Fontbonne University, said in a 2008 review on catholicbooksreview.org that "Johnson grounds her thinking in the transcendence of God that cannot be captured in any one theology or by any one cultural group" in a 2007 book. Raitt also said Johnson understood the "urgency of attending to all God's offspring, including the planet and its beautiful burden of living creatures of the sea, the skies, the earth."
- Much of Johnson's scholarship is built on the foundation of the Second Vatican Council, which urged members of the Catholic Church to overcome "every type of discrimination, whether social or cultural, whether based on sex, race, color, social condition, language or religion."
- In 2014, Johnson expressed what she perceives as the misguided priorities of the Catholic Church when she addressed the Leadership Conference of Women Religious (LCWR) while it was being investigated by the Vatican: "When the moral authority of the hierarchy is hemorrhaging due to financial scandals and many bishops who ... cover up sexual abuse of children, a cover up that continues in some quarters to this day, and thousands are drifting away from the church ... the waste of time on this investigation is unconscionable."
- In 1995, Johnson stated that "the religious life has always been meant to be countercultural and prophetic."

== Works ==
The main areas of focus for Johnson's writing are the mystery of God, Jesus Christ, Mary, saints, science and religion, human suffering, ethics, and issues related to women. In addition to her books, her works include over 100 essays in scholarly and popular journals as well as chapters in anthologies.

Her feminist theological method is a "thorough deconstruction of male images of God", a search for alternative Christian sources, and "reconstruction of the theological symbol".

One of Johnson's best-known works is She Who Is: The Mystery of God in Feminist Theological Discourse (1991), for which she became the fourth recipient of the University of Louisville and Louisville Presbyterian Theological Seminary Grawemeyer Award in 1993. It was the first extended attempt to integrate feminist categories such as experience and emancipation into classical Catholic theology. Library Journal notes the book is "grounded in classical Christian thought," but contemporary, and encompasses women's experience. The book covers the history of Christian language about God and argues for gender-neutral or gender balanced language in discussions of God, while reflecting an "inclusive and creative Christian spiritual doctrine."

Johnson edited The Church Women Want (2002), which received the Gender Award from the Catholic Press Association.

Her Quest for the Living God (2007) quickly became popular not only among the laity, but also has been used as a text in university courses. Quest for the Living God: Mapping Frontiers in the Theology of God, shares different understandings of God through experiences of those who are impoverished, oppressed, Holocaust victims, Hispanics, women as well as men, and people of a variety of religions. In his review of the book, Joseph Cunneen in American Catholic said: "This is one of the most important and provocative books on theology to have appeared in the U.S. since Vatican II." The book also found an audience among some non-Catholics, including Episcopal Bishop Mark Sisk who gave copies to his New York clergy; he selected it as his "innovative choice" for 2009 because it included "a valuable reflection and overview of modern theological trends."

In Ask the Beasts: Darwin and the God of Love Johnson examines God's relationship with the earth's non-human inhabitants. The inspiration for the book came in 2009 from the 150th anniversary of the publication of Charles Darwin's On the Origin of Species; Johnson received a research grant to leave for the 2011–2012 academic year to write it. In addition to including a close reading of Darwin's work, the book reflects on the Nicene Creed which, according to Johnson, "is really a narrative of God's evolutionary relationship to the world. God makes the universe, comes into the world, goes down into death, rises again. And, with the spirit, God continues to give life to creation and ready it for the life of world to come."

== Publications ==
- Consider Jesus: Waves of Renewal in Christology (1990)
- She Who Is: The Mystery of God in Feminist Theological Discourse (1992) ISBN 978-0824519254
- Women, Earth, and Creator Spirit (1993)
- Who Do You Say that I Am? : Introducing Contemporary Christology (1997)
- Friends of God and Prophets: A Feminist Theological Reading of the Communion of Saints (1998)
- The Church Women Want: Catholic Women in Dialogue (2002)
- Truly Our Sister: A Theology of Mary in the Communion of Saints (2003)
- Quest for the living God: mapping frontiers in the theology of God (2007)
- Ask the Beasts: Darwin and the God of Love (2014)
- Creation and the Cross: The Mercy of God for a Planet in Peril (2018)
- Come, Have Breakfast: Meditations on God and the Earth (2024)

== USCCB critique of Quest for the Living God ==
In March 2011 the USCCB Committee on Doctrine issued a doctrinal evaluation of Quest for a Living God that stated that this book is predicated "at the level of method" on "a false presupposition, an error that undermines the very nature of the study and so skews many of its arguments, rendering many of its conclusions theologically unacceptable." The evaluation equates Johnson's modern theism to an "Enlightenment deist notion of God that contains some elements, though now misrepresented, of a traditional Catholic understanding of God." "The false presupposition" in Quest for a Living God, according to the doctrinal evaluation, "is the conviction that all names for God are metaphors." The panentheism in Quest for a Living God "lacks any characteristic that would constitute a real difference between it and pantheism." Johnson, according to the doctrinal evaluation "employs standards from outside the faith to criticize and to revise in a radical fashion the conception of God revealed in Scripture and taught by the Magisterium." The doctrinal evaluation concluded "that the doctrine of God presented in Quest for the Living God does not accord with authentic Catholic teaching on essential points." But this doctrinal evaluation was not a formal ban.

=== Areas of concern ===
- "[T]he statement faults Johnson for treating language about God in the Bible and in church tradition as largely metaphorical, implying that truth about God is essentially 'unknowable'." The bishops also took issue with the conception "that all names for God are metaphors".
- "[A]n understanding of God that implies that the finite order is ontologically constitutive of God’s being. It is this view of God, which she identifies as "panentheism," that ... undermines God's transcendence."
- Johnson argues that masculine terms for God are attributable to an oppressive patriarchal system and that "...language for God should be analyzed not primarily in terms of its adequacy for expressing the reality of God—all human language fails to attain the reality of God—but in terms of its socio-political effects."
- Johnson's discussion of the influence of the Holy Spirit on other religious traditions appears to contradict "the Christian understanding of Jesus as the fullness of truth", particularly in regard to Dominus Iesus, the 2000 declaration by the Congregation for the Doctrine of the Faith, "On the Unicity and Salvific Universality of Jesus Christ and the Church".
- A panentheism that blurs the distinction between God and Creation.
- The bishops found that "Johnson’s presentation of the teaching of the Council of Nicaea is ambiguous", and, in keeping with her view that all language is metaphor, that the Trinity is symbolic.

In a letter about the doctrinal evaluation, Cardinal Donald Wuerl wrote that Johnson did not request an imprimatur, "a recommended practice" in 1983 Code of Canon Law canon 827 §3 through which "clarifications concerning the text can be made prior to its publication." Wuerl added that the Committee on Doctrine "would welcome an opportunity to discuss" Johnson's works. Father James Martin, in America, said that the commission's doctrinal evaluation of Quest for a Living God was detailed, and described an imprimatur as "the church's official approval of a book, granted by a bishop after a lengthy process of review by theologians."

Father Weinandy, executive secretary to the bishops Committee on Doctrine, said the impetus for reviewing Sister Johnson's book came from several American bishops not on the committee who had raised concerns about the book.

Although Johnson did not request an imprimatur, she complained that the doctrinal evaluation was issued without consulting with her, and she objected that it is a "misrepresentation" which "in several key instances...radically misinterprets what I think, and what I in fact wrote." In June 2011, Johnson sent a rebuttal of the doctrinal evaluation to the USCCB Committee on Doctrine.

In a July 2011 letter to theologian John Thiel, then the president of the Catholic Theological Society of America, Cardinal Timothy Dolan then president of the USCCB, explained that the bishops' administrative committee, made up of 36 bishops, mostly conference committee heads, had unanimously approved of the doctrine committee's statement regarding Johnson's book. After the Committee on Doctrine reviewed Johnson's rebuttal, it issued a response in October 2011 which reaffirmed its doctrinal evaluation and reiterated that it is "an assessment of the words of the book" and not a judgment of Johnson's "personal intention." In October 2011, Wuerl announced that he had offered to meet Johnson but she did not respond to his invitations.

== Reaction ==
In October 2011, several Catholic theologians expressed annoyance about the doctrinal evaluation because it was issued three years after the book was published and because it appeared to violate the bishops' own guidelines. (Note: In 2011, detractors of the doctrinal evaluation, including two professional associations of theologians, assumed that the Committee on Doctrine was using a process found in a 1989 protocol and complained that the 1989 protocol was not followed. In 2012, the process found in a 2011 draft of a different protocol, which is an "internal document, developed for internal use," was published in When the Magisterium Intervenes. According to James A. Coriden, the 1989 protocol definitely includes a dialog and has an "explicit presupposition of sound doctrine, which holds unless it is refuted by contrary evidence;" while in contrast, the 2011 protocol potentially includes a dialog and has "an assumption that the author is either ambiguous, in error, or both.") The doctrine committee has defended its actions, explaining that Johnson's book was already in print, that it was being used in colleges and seminaries. According to Executive Secretary Weinandy, "There was a sense of urgency in this matter, because the bishops knew that Sister Johnson’s book was being taught in undergraduate theology".

There was confusion about the process used in the doctrinal evaluation. Those guidelines, which had been embraced and promoted in an effort to soothe the simmering conflicts between the Catholic hierarchy and theologians, called for discussion and engagement with theologians rather than public pronouncements.

There were concerns that the executive secretary of the committee, Rev. Thomas Weinandy, was a conservative theologian subsequently appointed by Pope Francis to the International Theological Commission which assists the Congregation for the Doctrine of the Faith. According to Susan Ross, the president of the 1,400-member Catholic Theological Society of America, Weinandy's tenure with the bishops' conference was "antagonistic" and the committee's approach on doctrine while he was there "adversarial." In a speech delivered in May 2011, Weinandy called theologians a "curse and affliction upon the church if their work is not grounded in church teaching and an active faith life, and ends up promoting doctrinal and moral error."

Boston College theologian Stephen J. Pope supported Johnson, as did Terrence W. Tilley, chair of Fordham's theology department and on the board of the Catholic Theological Society of America." The bishops, according to Tilley, have "reject[ed] 50 years of contemporary theology." Johnson, Tilley said, "has been attempting to push Catholic thinking along new paths. And the bishops have now made it clear – this is something they stand against." Fordham President Joseph M. McShane said he regarded the bishops’ action as "an invitation to dialogue".

The timing, tone, and substance of the doctrinal evaluation impacted not only Johnson but, according to the National Catholic Reporter, "At the heart of the severe condemnation of Quest for the Living God... is an unresolved theological conflict that revealed a rift between mainstream Catholic theologians and U.S. bishops.... Seldom has the theologian/bishop rift been on display so publically [sic] as it has been in the criticisms and defenses involved in the episcopal Quest for the Living God assessment." Johnson had been viewed as a leader of feminist scholars who dissect how cultural biases among biblical writers may have affected women's approved roles in Christian religious tradition. Catholic theologians have engaged in such issues as standard academic subjects, understanding ancient texts in their historic and cultural contexts. The New York Times said: "Many on the left and the right agree on one point: The bishops, who have already shut off discussion about ordaining women, are signaling that other long-debated questions about gender in the church – the choice of pronouns in prayers, the study of the male and female aspects of God – are substantially off-limits as well."

Cardinal Walter Kasper, who has a close relationship with Francis and is "known in media circles as 'the pope's theologian'," said during a speech at Fordham University in 2014 that he highly esteemed the writings of Johnson, joking that he was also considered "suspect" at the Vatican.

In 2014, the LCWR presented its Outstanding Leadership Award to Johnson. Johnson maintained her opinions, that it appeared to her that the members of the USCCB had never read her book, and that "no one, not myself or the theological community, the media, or the general public knows what doctrinal issue is at stake."

When Cardinal Wuerl resigned from his post in 2018 in the wake of charges that he mishandled allegations of sexual abuse, the National Catholic Reporter said that Wuerl had earlier faced widespread criticism for his role in the U.S. bishops' criticism of Johnson, whom it called one of the "most prominent and respected theologians" in the U.S.

== Honorary degrees ==
- Doctor of Letters, honoris causa, Saint Mary's College, Notre Dame, Indiana, 1994
- Doctor of Theology, honoris causa, Maryknoll School of Theology, New York, 1995
- Doctor of Theology, honoris causa, Catholic Theological Union, Chicago, Illinois, 1996
- Doctor of Sacred Theology, honoris causa, Siena College, Loudonville, New York, 1998
- Doctor of Humane Letters, honoris causa, Le Moyne College, Syracuse, New York, 1999
- Doctor of Humane Letters, honoris causa, St. Joseph's College, Brooklyn, New York, 2001
- Doctor of Pedagogy, honoris causa, Manhattan College, Riverdale, New York, 2002
- Doctor of Theology, honoris causa, Jesuit School of Theology at Berkeley, California, 2003
- Doctor of Humane Letters, honoris causa, College of New Rochelle, New York, 2004
- Doctor of Humane Letters, honoris causa, Villanova University, Pennsylvania, 2005 (Villanova also gave her the Civitas Dei Medal in 2024)
- Doctor of Human Letters, honoris causa, Saint Joseph College, West Hartford, Connecticut, 2006
- Doctor of the university, honoris causa, Saint Paul University, Ottawa, Ontario, 2008
- Doctor of Sacred Letters, honoris causa, University of St. Michael's College, Toronto, Ontario, 2010
- Doctor of Educational Leadership, honoris causa, Saint Mary's University of Minnesota, Winona, Minnesota, 2011
