= Georges Tavard =

French-born American theologian and academic

The Rev. Dr. Georges Henri Tavard AA
- Born: February 6, 1922; Nancy, France
- Died: August 13, 2007 (aged 85); Paris, France
- Education: Faculties Theologiques de Lyon
- Occupations: Professor, Theologian

Georges Henri Tavard, AA (February 6, 1922 – August 13, 2007) was an ordained member of the Augustinians of the Assumption. He lectured extensively in the areas of historical theology, ecumenism, and spirituality.

== Early life ==
Georges Tavard was born on February 6, 1922, in Nancy, France. He entered a religious community known as the Augustinians of the Assumption and was ordained in 1947. At that point, Tavard began doctoral studies at the Faculties theologiques de Lyon. He held the Doctor of Sacred Theology from Lyons, and he taught theology at Capenor House in Surrey, England from 1949 to 1951 and the Princeton Theological Seminary from 1951 to 1952. He then came to the United States as a permanent resident in 1952, and became a naturalized citizen in 1960.

== Career ==
Tavard accepted a teaching position at Mount Mercy College in Pittsburgh, where he would teach for six years. During his tenure at Mount Mercy College, Pope John XXIII named Tavard a peritus conciliaris at Vatican II, where he also served as a consultant to the Secretariat for the Promotion of Christian Unity. After departing Mount Mercy College, Tavard taught at Assumption College, Penn State University and Methodist Theological School in Ohio in Delaware, Ohio, where he retired in 1990.

Father Tavard was a member of the Anglican-Roman Catholic Joint Preparatory Commission ("Malta Report", 1968), and then of the Anglican-Roman Catholic International Commission (ARCIC-1: "Final Report," 1983) until 1983, when he was assigned to the International dialogue of the RC Church and the World Methodist Council. He was part of ARC-USA (Anglican-Roman Catholic Conversations in the USA) and of Lutheran-Roman Catholic Dialogue in the USA from the beginning. He has lectured and written extensively in the areas of historical theology, ecumenism, and spirituality.

He was an official Catholic observer at the World Council of Churches's Conference on Faith and Order in Montreal, 1963, at the General Convention of the Episcopal Church in Denver, CO, 1980, and the delegate of the Catholic Church at the meeting of the Anglican Consultative Council in Panama, 1997.

== Controversial positions ==
=== Ecumenism ===
Tavard was best known for his emphatic support of ecumenism, focusing on bridging the gaps between Roman Catholicism and Protestant sects of Christianity as well as between Christianity and Judaism. He voted [in what way, since he was not a bishop?]for the Decree on Ecumenism of the Second Vatican Council, which constituted a starting point for bi-lateral dialogues between churches. While he recognized that the papacy and many churches would be reluctant to fully embrace one another, he stressed the importance of education for church officials in pressing for rapprochement with Christians of all denominations. While he conceded that consolidation under one church was not feasible, he still implored theologians and lay Christians alike to discuss their views, seek as much common ground as they could find and leave it to God from there. He detested the manner in which the Catholic Church treated other sects and their leaders. For example, he beseeched the Catholic brass [Who exactly? Catholics didn't have "brass," but there are bishops, cardinals, and popes among other leaders] to cease with the hundreds of years of condemnations of Martin Luther and to accord him a place of honor instead. Father Tavard made a significant contribution to Symposia of The Villanova Theology Institute founded by Professor Joseph Papin through his presentation: "Ecumenical Dimensions: A New Hope and Vision of unity" in The Pilgrim People: A Vision With Hope, ed. Joseph Papin, The Villanova University Press, 1970, pp. 143–168. He also addressed the important topic of a reconstruction of the ministry: "Can the Ministry be Re-Constructed?" in Transcendence and Immanence, Reconstruction in the Light of Process Thinking, Festschrift in Honour of Joseph Papin, ed. Joseph Armenti, Volume I, The Abbey Press, 1972, pp. 83–98. (Some issue arose concerning the editing of Tavard's article, but a comparison of the manuscript submitted and the printed text shows that they were identical). Again, in looking to further the unity of Christians and a "'wider ecumenism' embracing all great religions", Fr. Tavard authored an article which sought a "positive response" to this widing of the ecumenical ideal: "Two Sources for Christology," in The Papin Gedenkschrift: Dimensions in the Human Religious Quest, Essays in Memory of Joseph Papin, Volume I: Theological Dimensions, ed. Joseph Armenti (Michigan, 1987), pp. 38–53.

=== Women's role in the church ===
Tavard raised the issue of women's roles within the Catholic Church in his 1973 book, Women in Christian Tradition, one of the first major theologians to do so. While he remained a part of the minority for his view that women needed a bigger role in the Catholic Church, he insisted that the ordination of women was not only fair but also necessary to the survival of the church. Tavard wrongly predicted that within fifty years of the book's publication, women would be able to be ordained and priests would be allowed to marry. True to his ecumenist beliefs, Tavard cited the models of Protestant churches when prescribing a remedy for the waning numbers of Catholic vocations. While he acknowledged that a referendum allowing women to be ordained would fail in a referendum amongst American Catholics, he pointed out that it would succeed amongst French Catholics and thus was an unavoidable aspect of future Catholicism.

=== Vietnam War ===
Tavard opposed American policy in Vietnam, questioning the moral compass of those who supported American involvement there. He asserted that it was a civil war and that only the well-being of the people in that country should guide American policy with regard to Vietnam. He argued that the fact that one side was Communist did not matter and that the American government was using the "Communist" tag to exploit the fears associated with that term amongst the American public in order to wage a war he deemed immoral and unjust.

== Books ==
- Holy Writ or Holy Church: The Crisis of the Protestant Reformation. Assumption College, Worcester, Mass 1959; Harper & Bros., 1960.
- Paul Tillich and the Christian Message. New York: Scribner, 1962.
- The Pilgrim Church. New York: Herder and Herder. 1967. ISBN 978-0223298385
- The Church, Community of Salvation: An Ecumenical Ecclesiology. Collegeville, Minn.: Liturgical Press, 1992. ISBN 978-0-8146-5789-8
- The Thousand Faces of the Virgin Mary. Collegeville, Minn.: Liturgical Press, 1996. ISBN 978-0-8146-5914-4
- Trina Deitas: The Controversy between Hincmar and Gottschalk. Milwaukee: Marquette University Press, 1996. ISBN 0874626366
- The Starting Point of Calvin's Theology. Grand Rapids, Mich.: W.B. Eerdmans, 2000. ISBN 978-0-8028-4718-8
- The Contemplative Church: Joachim and His Adversaries. Milwaukee: Marquette University Press, 2005. ISBN 978-0-87462-726-8
- From Bonaventure to the Reformers. Milwaukee: Marquette University Press, 2005. ISBN 0-87462-695-1 ISBN 9780874626957
- Vatican II and the Ecumenical Way. Milwaukee: Marquette University Press, 2006. ISBN 978-0-87462-729-9

== Awards ==
- 1965 Honorary D.D., Bexley Hall Seminary at Kenyon College, Ohio
- 1974 John Courtney Murray Award, Catholic Theological Society of America
- 1981 Medal of St. Augustine of Canterbury, granted by the Archbishop of Canterbury
- 1999 Catholic Press Association Book Award, for "The Spiritual Way of St. Jeanne d'Arc"
- 2002 Honorary Doctorate in Humane Letters, Duquesne University, Pittsburgh, PA

== See also ==
- Marquette University Special Collections and University Archives
- Marquette University
