= David Tracy =

American Catholic theologian and priest, and academic (1939–2025)

The Reverend David Tracy
- Born: David William Tracy; January 6, 1939; Yonkers, New York, US
- Died: April 29, 2025 (aged 86); Chicago, Illinois, US
- Relatives: John Emmet Tracy (nephew)

Ecclesiastical career
- Religion: Christianity (Roman Catholic)
- Church: Latin Church
- Ordained: 1963 (priest)

Academic background
- Education: Pontifical Gregorian University
- Doctoral advisor: Bernard Lonergan
- Influences: Mircea Eliade; Karl Rahner; Paul Ricœur; Paul Tillich; Hans-Georg Gadamer; Bernard Lonergan

Academic work
- Discipline: Theology
- School or tradition: Public theology
- Institutions: University of Chicago
- Main interests: Hermeneutics; theological method
- Notable works: Blessed Rage for Order (1975); The Analogical Imagination (1981); Plurality and Ambiguity (1987)

David William Tracy (January 6, 1939 – April 29, 2025) was an American Catholic theologian and priest. He was the Andrew Thomas Greeley and Grace McNichols Greeley Distinguished Service Professor Emeritus of Catholic Studies at the University of Chicago Divinity School. In 2020 he was elected to the American Philosophical Society.

== Early life and education ==
David Tracy was born on January 6, 1939, to John Charles Tracy and Eileen Marie Tracy (née Rossell) in Yonkers, New York. He had two brothers, John Jr. and Arthur. His father was a union organizer who liked to read Henry Adams to his children.

Feeling an intense call to the priesthood as an adolescent, Tracy started attending the Cathedral School in 1952. The Cathedral School served as a high school and minor seminary for the Archdiocese of New York. In 1960, he left New York for Rome to study at the Gregorian University. His vocation to study theology was profoundly encouraged by the Second Vatican Council taking place at that time. He was ordained in Rome on December 18, 1963, and served in the diocese of Bridgeport, Connecticut, in 1963. Tracy received his Licentiate of Sacred Theology from the Gregoriana in 1964, after which he spent one year at a parish in Stamford, Connecticut. He has said that he had always wanted to work in a parish, but during his one year of doing so, he felt a strong call to the academic life. He returned to Rome and received his doctorate from the Gregorian University in 1969.

== Career ==
Tracy's first academic teaching appointment was a lectureship at the Catholic University of America in Washington, DC, where he began in 1967. In 1968, Tracy joined with Bernard McGinn and twenty other professors at CUA in rejecting Pope Paul VI's encyclical Humanae vitae. He and the others were tried by CUA's faculty senate and summarily fired. They sued the university, were represented by American Civil Liberties Union lawyers, and ultimately won their case.

In the midst of this trial, Jerald Brauer, then dean of the University of Chicago Divinity School, convinced Tracy (as well as Bernard McGinn) to come to the University of Chicago. They were then the first two Catholic priests on that faculty. In 1985, Tracy was named a Distinguished Service Professor there, and in 1987, a Distinguished Service Professor of Roman Catholic Studies. Tracy also held the Andrew Thomas Greeley and Grace McNichols Greeley Professorship in Roman Catholic Studies, which was established in 1984 by Roman Catholic priest, sociologist and novelist Andrew Greeley. He also served on Chicago's Committee on the Analysis of Ideas and Methods and the Committee on Social Thought. He taught a range of courses beyond theology in collaboration with other University of Chicago faculty. Tracy remained at the Divinity School until his retirement in 2006.

Tracy served as president of the Catholic Theological Society of America from 1976 to 1977. In 1980, that organization awarded him the John Courtney Murray Award, the highest award of the society. In 1982, he was elected to the American Academy of Arts and Sciences.

In 1999–2000, Tracy gave the Gifford Lectures at the University of Edinburgh. The title of his lectures was This Side of God. The Gifford Lectures are widely considered to be the highest honor for those working in theology and religious studies.

On September 29, 2016, he gave "Gregory of Nyssa: An Infinite, Incomprehensible, Infinitely Loving God" as the 2016 Costan Lecture at Georgetown University, as part of a lecture series on early Christianity.

In 2018, Tracy contributed an essay to the catalog of the Metropolitan Museum of Art exhibition Heavenly Bodies: Fashion and the Catholic Imagination. Tracy was described by Andrew Bolton, the curator of the exhibition, as "the J. D. Salinger of the theological world".

== Writings ==
- The Achievement of Bernard Lonergan (1970)
- Blessed Rage for Order: The New Pluralism in Theology (1975)
- Toward Vatican III: The Work that Needs To Be Done, with Hans Küng and Johann Baptist Metz (1978)
- The Analogical Imagination: Christian Theology and the Culture of Pluralism (1981)
- Talking About God: Doing Theology in the Context of Modern Pluralism, with John Cobb (1983)
- Short History of the Interpretation of the Bible, with Robert Grant (1984)
- A Catholic Vision, with Stephen Happel (1984)
- Plurality and Ambiguity (1987)
- Dialogue with the Other: The Inter-religious Dialogue (1990)
- On Naming the Present: God, Hermeneutics, and Church (1994)
- Fragments: The Existential Situation of Our Time: Selected Essays, Volume 1 (2020)
- Filaments: Theological Profiles: Selected Essays, Volume 2 (2020)

== Personal life ==
Tracy died in Chicago on April 29, 2025, at the age of 86. His nephew is American-Canadian actor John Emmet Tracy.

Academic offices
Preceded by Charles Taylor	Gifford Lecturer at the University of Edinburgh; 1999–2000	Succeeded by The Baroness O'Neill of Bengarve
Awards
Preceded by Bernard Cooke	John Courtney Murray Award; 1980	Succeeded by Gerard S. Sloyan
