= Peter C. Phan =

Vietnamese-born American Catholic theologian

The Reverend Peter C. Phan
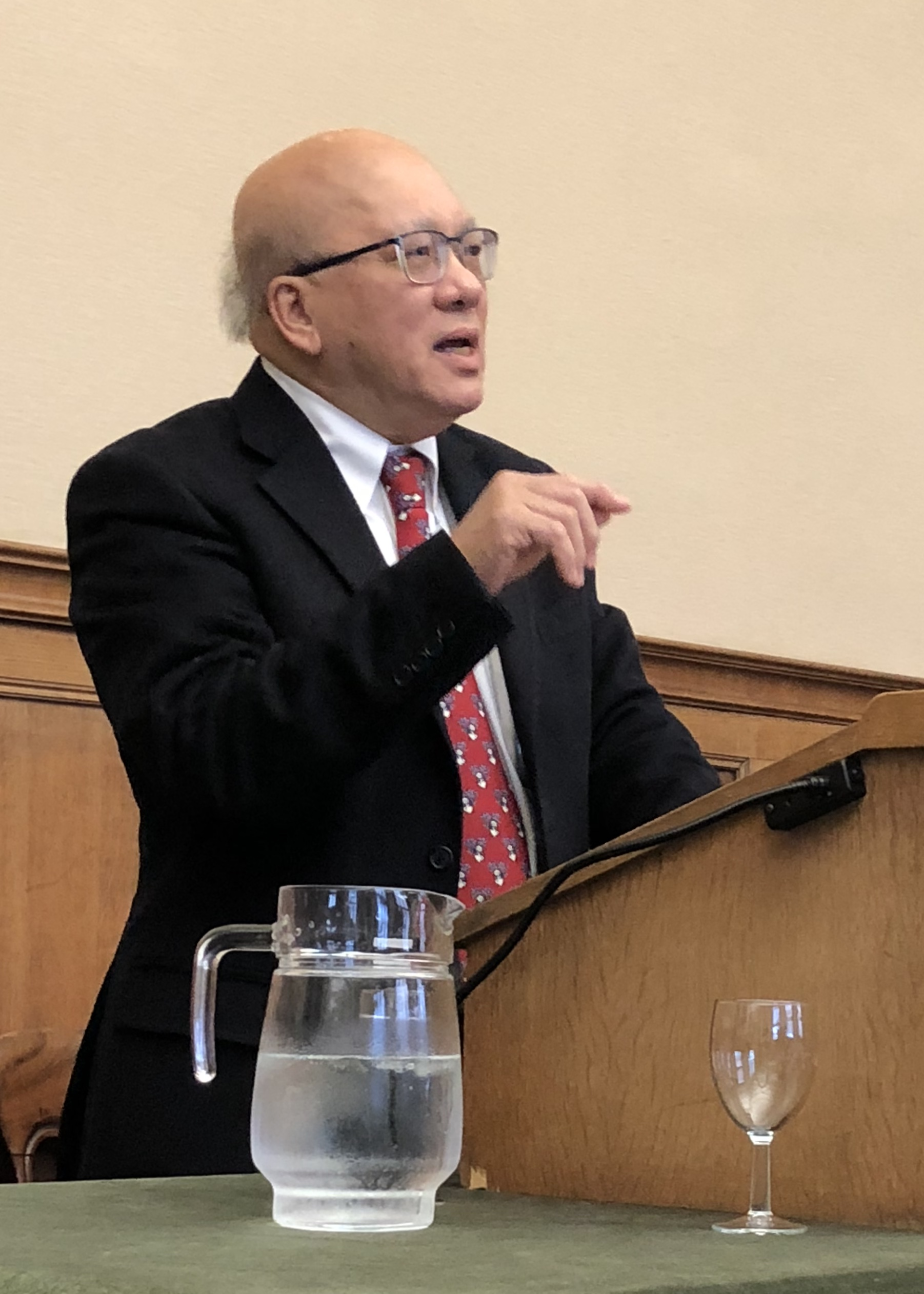
- Born: January 5, 1943 (age 83); Vietnam
- Education: University of London; Salesian Pontifical University
- Occupation: Theologian
- Theological work
- Tradition or movement: Catholic theology

Peter C. Phan (Vietnamese: Phêrô Phan Đình Cho; born January 5, 1943) is a Vietnamese-born American Catholic theologian and the inaugural holder of the Ellacuria Chair of Catholic Social Thought at Georgetown University.

== Biography ==
Phan has earned three doctorates: Doctor of Theology from Salesian University in Rome (1978), Doctor of Philosophy from the University of London (1986), and Doctor of Divinity from the University of London (2000). Phan has also been awarded three honorary Doctorates: Doctor of Theology honoris causa, Catholic Theological Union (2001), Doctor of Humane Letters honoris causa, Elms College (2007), and Doctor of Divinity, Virginia Theological Seminary (2017).

Presently the Ellacuria Chair of Catholic Social Thought at Georgetown University, Phan has previously taught at the Catholic University of America and Union Theological Seminary. His many writings have been translated into Italian, German, French, Spanish, Polish, Chinese, Japanese, and Vietnamese. His writings have received many awards from professional societies.

== Controversy ==
Phan has been under investigation by the Congregation for the Doctrine of the Faith and the Committee of Doctrine of the USCCB, for his 2004 book, Being Religious Interreligiously. He published in 2017 a response to the queries raised by the two church bodies, through the book The Joy of Religious Pluralism.

== Honors ==
Phan is the first non-Anglo to be elected President of the Catholic Theological Society of America. In 2010 Phan was given the John Courtney Murray Award, the highest honor of the Catholic Theological Society of America, in recognition for outstanding and distinguished achievement in theology.

A festschrift was published in 2016 in his honor, focusing on the theme of world Christianity. On March 30–31, 2017, Georgetown University hosted an international symposium to discuss Phan's influence and legacy entitled "Theology without Borders: Celebrating the Legacy of Peter C. Phan." This meeting addressed Phan's scholarly work on aspects of theology, including patristics, ecclesiology, eschatology, mission, inculturation, interreligious dialogue, religious pluralism, and World Christianity. He was the Cunningham Lecturer at New College, Edinburgh, in October 2018, with the topic "Migration of Christianity, Christianity of Migration."

== Works ==
=== Books authored ===
- Social Thought. Wilmington, DE: Michael Glazier, 1984.
- Culture and Eschatology: The Iconographical Vision of Paul Edokimov. New York: Peter Lang, 1985.
- Grace and the Human Condition. Wilmington, DE: Michael Glazier, 1988.
- Eternity in Time: A Study of Karl Rahner’s Eschatology. Selingsgrove, PA: Susquehanna University Press, 1988. ISBN 978-0941664837
- Responses to 101 Questions on Death and Eternal Life. New York: Paulist Press, 1997. ISBN 978-0809137114
- Mission and Catechesis: Alexandre de Rhodes and Inculturation in Seventeenth- Century Vietnam. Maryknoll, NY: Orbis Books, 1998. ISBN 978-1608334742
- The Mission of God: Its Challenges and Demands in Today’s World. Quezon City, Philippines: East Asian Pastoral Institute, 2002. Memperjuangkan: Misi Allah Di Tengah Dunia Dewasa Ini (Indonesian translation).
- In Our Own Tongues: Perspectives from Asia on Mission and Inculturation. Maryknoll, NY: Orbis Books, 2003. ISBN 978-1608334728
- Christianity with an Asian Face: Asian American Theology in the Making. Maryknoll, NY: Orbis Books, 2003. ISBN 978-1608334711
- Being Religious Interreligiously: Asian Perspectives on Interfaith Dialogue in Postmodernity. Maryknoll, NY: Orbis Books, 2004. ISBN 978-1608334735
- Vietnamese-American Catholics. New York: Paulist Press, 2005. ISBN 978-0809143528
- Living into Death, Dying into Life: Death and the Afterlife. Hobe Sound, FL: Lectio Publishing, 2014. ISBN 978-0989839778
- The Joy of Religious Pluralism: A Personal Journey. Mayknoll, NY: Orbis Books, 2017. ISBN 978-1626982253
- Asian Christianities: History, Theology and Practice. Maryknoll, NY: Orbis Books, 2018. ISBN 978-1626980938

=== Books edited ===
- Christianity and the Wider Ecumenism. New York: Paragon House, 1990.
- Church and Theology: Essays in Memory of Carl Peter. Washington, DC: The Catholic University of America Press, 1994.
- Ethnicity, Nationality and Religious Experience. Lanham, MD: University Press of America, 1994. ISBN 978-0819195241
- Journeys at the Margin: Toward an Autobiographical Theology in Asian-American Perspective. Collegeville: Liturgical Press, 1999. ISBN 978-0814624647
- The Gift of the Church: A Textbook on Ecclesiology in Honor of Patrick Granfield. Collegeville: Liturgical Press, 2000.
- The Asian Synod: Texts and Commentaries. Maryknoll, NY: Orbis Books, 2002. ISBN 978-1608334704
- The Future of the Asian Churches: The Asian Synod & Ecclesia in Asia. Manila: Claretian Press, 2002, with James Kroeger.
- Many Faces, One Church: Cultural Diversity and the American Catholic Experience. Lanham: Rowman & Littlefield, 2005. ISBN 978-0742532144
- The Directory on Popular Piety and the Liturgy: A Commentary. Collegeville, MN: Liturgical Press, 2005. ISBN 978-0814628935
- The Cambridge Companion to the Trinity. Cambridge: Cambridge University Press, 2011. ISBN 978-0521877398
- Christianities in Asia. Oxford: Blackwell Publishing, 2011. ISBN 978-1405160896
- Contemporary Issues of Migration and Theology. Co-editor Elaine Padilla. New York: Palgrave/Macmillan. 2013. ISBN 978-1137031495
- Theologies of Migration in the Abrahamic Religions. Co-editor Elaine Padilla. New York: Palgrave/Macmillan, 2014. ISBN 978-1137001047
- Christianities in Migration. Co-editor Elaine Padilla. New York: Palgrave/Macmillan, 2016. ISBN 978-1137031648
- Transcontinental Links, Emerging Maps, and Polycentric Structures: A Special Issue on the “Munich School of World Christianity.” Co-editors Adrian Hermann and Ciprian Burlacioiu. University Park, PA: Penn State Press, 2016.
- Learning from All the Faithful: A Contemporary Theology of the Sensus Fidei. Co-editor Bradford Hinze. Eugene, OR: Pickwick Press, 2016. ISBN 978-1498280211
- Violence, Religion, Peacemaking: Contributions of Interreligious Dialogue. Co-editor Douglas Irvin-Erikson. New York: Palgrave- Macmillan, 2016. ISBN 978-1137568519
- Christian Theology in the Age of Migration Implications for World Christianity. New York: Lexington Books, 2020. ISBN 9781793600745

== See also ==
- Christianity in Asia
- Federation of Asian Bishops' Conferences
- World Christianity
- Catholic Theological Society of America
