= Catholic Theological Society of America =

Professional association founded in 1946

The Catholic Theological Society of America (CTSA) is a professional association of Catholic theologians founded in 1946 to promote studies and research in theology within the Catholic tradition. Its members are primarily in the United States and Canada.

== Role and activities ==
The CTSA provides a forum for the exchange of ideas relating to theology, problems, and how to develop a more effective educational approach. The society also tries to foster within the Christian community a better understanding of their faith. It advances its work through annual June conventions, scholarly publications and committees that work throughout the year. Conventions are guided by a common theme that is chosen by the Vice President. Plenary addresses and responses are published in the proceedings.

This organization is membership based. Active membership is for those who earned a doctoral degree in theological or related studies. Associate membership is for those who have completed coursework in doctoral studies in theological or related studies. A Committee on Admissions review applications for membership and recommend admission. Active members vote on accepting new members at the annual business meeting.

The John Courtney Murray Award is the highest honor bestowed by the Catholic Theological Society of America, named after a theologian known for his work on religious liberty.

The Catholic Theological Society of America grants the Catherine Mowry LaCugna Award to new scholars for the best academic essay in the field of theology within the Roman Catholic tradition.

The Ann O'Hara Graff Memorial Award is awarded by the Women's Consultation in Constructive Theology. The citation reads, "The Ann O’Hara Graff award was established to honor the life and recognize the scholarly commitments of our late colleague Ann O’Hara Graff, whose insight and passion combined to weave theology constructively together with life outside the academy."

The Committee for Underrepresented Racial and Ethnic Groups awards the CUERG Distinguished Scholar-Leader Award. This award was started in 2024 and the inaugural recipient was C. Vanessa White.

== Criticisms ==
Several members of the society have been criticized by the Holy See's Congregation for the Doctrine of the Faith or US Bishops' Conference Committee on Doctrine, including Roger Haight, Richard McBrien, Elizabeth Johnson, Peter Phan, Margaret Farley. and Charles Curran.

An internal report of the society, dated May 15, 2013, and released in October of that year, stated:

The self-conception of many members that the CTSA is open to all Catholic theologians is faulty and self-deceptive. As one of our members put it, the CTSA is a group of liberal theologians and "this permeates virtually everything". Because the CTSA does not aspire to be a partisan group, both attitudes and practices will have to shift if the CTSA is to become the place where all perspectives within Catholic theology in North America are welcome.

=== Women's ordination ===
In response to Ordinatio sacerdotalis, the Catholic Theological Society of America set up a task force to study the question. The task force produced a report, "Tradition and the Ordination of Women", which said that Ordinatio sacerdotalis is mistaken with regard to its claims on the authority of this teaching and its grounds in Tradition.

== Presidents ==
The following have served as President of the Catholic Theological Society of America:

1. Francis J. Connell (1946–1947)
2. James E. O'Connell (1947–1948)
3. Eugene M. Burke (1948–1949)
4. Gerard Kelly (1949–1950)
5. John J. Galvin (1950–1951)
6. Edmond D. Bernard (1951–1952)
7. John M. A. Fearns (1952–1953)
8. Gerard Yelle (1953–1954)
9. William R. O'Connor (1954–1955)
10. Augustine P. Hennessy (1955–1956)
11. George W. Shea (1956–1957)
12. John F. X. Sweeney (1957–1958)
13. Michael J. Murphy (1958–1959)
14. Lawrence J. Riley (1959–1960)
15. Thomas W. Coyle 1960–1961)
16. Aloysius McDonough (1961–1962)
17. Ferrer Smith (1962–1963)
18. Richard T. Doherty (1963–1964)
19. Gerald Van Ackeren (1964–1965)
20. Eamon R. Carroll (1965–1966)
21. Paul E. McKeever (1966–1967)
22. Walter J. Burghardt (1967–1968)
23. Austin B. Vaughan (1968–1969)
24. Charles E. Curran (1969–1970)
25. Richard A. McCormick (1970–1971)
26. Carl J. Peter (1971–1972)
27. John H. Wright (1972–1973)
28. Richard P. McBrien (1973–1974)
29. Luke Salm (1974–1975)
30. Avery Dulles (1975–1976)
31. David W. Tracy (1976–1977)
32. Agnes Cunningham (1977–1978)
33. Kenan B. Osborne (1978–1979)
34. William J. Hill (1979–1980)
35. Thomas F. O'Meara (1980–1981)
36. Leo J. O'Donovan (1981–1982)
37. Bernard J. Cooke (1982–1983)
38. Michael Fahey (1983–1984)
39. Patrick Granfield (1984–1985)
40. Francis Schüssler Fiorenza (1985–1986)
41. Monika Hellwig (1986–1987)
42. Michael J. Scanlon (1987–1988)
43. John P. Boyle (1988–1989)
44. Anne E. Patrick (1989–1990)
45. Walter H. Principe (1990–1991)
46. Michael J. Buckley (1991–1992)
47. Lisa Sowle Cahill (1992–1993)
48. Gerard S. Sloyan (1993–1994)
49. Roger Haight (1994–1995)
50. Elizabeth Johnson (1995–1996)
51. William Thompson-Uberuaga (1996–1997)
52. Mary Ann Donovan (1997–1998)
53. Robert Schreiter (1998–1999)
54. Margaret Farley (1999–2000)
55. Kenneth R. Himes (2000–2001)
56. Peter Phan (2001–2002)
57. Jon Nilson (2002–2003)
58. M. Shawn Copeland (2003–2004)
59. Roberto S. Goizueta (2004–2005)
60. Mary Catherine Hilkert, O.P. (2005–2006)
61. Daniel Finn (2006–2007)
62. Margaret O'Gara (2007–2008)
63. Terrence W. Tilley (2008–2009)
64. Bryan N. Massingale (2009–2010)
65. Mary Ann Hinsdale (2010–2011)
66. John E. Thiel (2011–2012)
67. Susan A. Ross (2012–2013)
68. Richard Gaillardetz (2013–2014)
69. Susan K. Wood (2014–2015)
70. Bradford E. Hinze (2015–2016)
71. David Hollenbach (2016–2017)
72. Mary E. Hines (2017–2018)
73. Paul Lakeland (2018–2019)
74. Maria Pilar Aquino (2019–2020 & 2020-2021)
75. Christine Firer Hinze (2021–2022)
76. Francis Xavier Clooney, S.J. (2022-2023)
77. Kristin E. Heyer (2023-2024)
78. Nancy Pineda-Madrid (2024-2025)
79. Susan Abraham (2025-2026)
