= Margaret Farley =

American Sister of Mercy and theologian (born 1935)

Margaret A. Farley RSM (born April 15, 1935) is an American Catholic religious sister and a member of the Sisters of Mercy. She was Gilbert L. Stark Professor Emerita of Christian Ethics at Yale University Divinity School, where she taught Christian ethics from 1971 to 2007. Farley is the first woman appointed to serve full-time on the Yale School board, along with Henri Nouwen as its first Catholic faculty members. She is a past president of Catholic Theological Society of America.

Farley's controversial book, Just Love (2006), brought criticism and censure from the Holy See, specifically the Congregation of the Doctrine of the Faith, for moral views which oppose the teachings of the Catholic Church. However, it has received both support and endorsement from the groups Leadership Conference of Women Religious and the Catholic Theological Society of America.

== Academic career ==
Farley received Bachelor's and Masters of Arts degrees from the University of Detroit, followed by a degree in philosophy and a doctoral degree from Yale University She began her teaching career at the Yale Divinity School in 1971 and earned her doctorate there two years later. She appeared on the cover of the Yale Alumni Magazine in 1986 in connection with a feature article on teachers of note.

In 1986, Farley published Personal Commitments: Making, Keeping Breaking, which a reviewer in the Journal of Religion wrote "charts out what to watch for, when as a counselor, you are helping someone think through commitments" and focuses on "long-term commitments involving sexual intimacy". He added: "She does not display her erudition but hides it in footnotes. She expresses herself almost always in words available to the nonspecialist. She is courageous, breaking new ground." He singled out "the way she succinctly links the long heritage of Jewish and Christian thinking about 'covenant' with her earlier exploration of human relationships." A reviewer in the Journal of the American Academy of Religion called it "a valuable contribution to the literature of Christian ethics, and in particular to the discussion of the value of Christian love and special relationships. Farley has combined psychological subtlety and moral seriousness in such a way as to produce that rarity, a book that will be of great interest to the scholar, and yet would be useful in a parish or a counselor's office as well."

Farley received the John Courtney Murray Award from the Catholic Theological Society of America (CTSA) in 1992. She has served as president of both the CTSA and the Society of Christian Ethics. Yale Divinity School presented a conference in her honor called Just Love: Feminism, Theology and Ethics in a Global Context in 2005.

In 2008 Farley received the University of Louisville Grawemeyer Award in Religion. A festschrift in her honor was published that same year.

== Other activities ==
In 1984 Farley was one of 97 theologians and religious persons who signed "A Catholic Statement on Pluralism and Abortion", calling for pluralism and discussion within the Catholic Church regarding the church's position on abortion.

Early in her career, Farley called the ordination of women a "moral imperative".

In 1987, discussing a Vatican document on procreation, Farley criticized its authors for not consulting women and especially "parents who are struggling with these issues". She said its exclusion of all means but sexual intercourse between husband and wife "were not justified in terms of the complexity of the questions involved" and predicted that "People making decisions will not take it seriously. It doesn't offer them the answers they need. The church, by acting in an authoritarian way loses the kind of moral power regarding these issues."

Asked in 1997 to comment on the decline of female enrollment in divinity schools in the United States, following their increased presence in the 1970s, Farley said that

It's hard for them to have all that education and to know they can't be ordained. It challenges their faith and commitment. The possibility of ordination is looking dimmer, but I'm still optimistic that someday it may be possible or even needed. Catholicism is the only denomination with a shortage of clergy.

In 2001, when the Jesuit theologian Avery Dulles was named a cardinal and explained that the theologian's role was "to show why the church is teaching what she is", Farley contributed to a discussion of the changing role of the academic theologian. She said the theologian could play "an exploratory role" and added: "If you're going to ask questions, you may come up with some wrong answers, but you may come up with new insights. The best kind of theologian is one who is anchored in the tradition" but understands that it needs to address future generations.

In 2002, Farley gave the Madeleva Lecture at St. Mary's College (Indiana).

Farley participated in the Sisters of Mercy study on tubal ligation.

Farley and fellow Mercy Sister Eileen P. Hogan founded the All-Africa Conference, a project intended to bring together African women religious to develop strategies for responding to the pandemic of HIV/AIDS in Africa.

Farley currently holds the title of professor emerita at Yale Divinity School.

== Just Love (2006) ==
Farley published Just Love: A Framework for Christian Sexual Ethics in 2006. The critical reception was "widespread praise", leading to its use as a textbook in college courses on sexual ethics. A reviewer in Commonweal noted that Farley "at times ... has become a point of polarization", called the book "an important resource and spur for further collaboration among Christians and others on the knotty issues of sexual ethics", but faulted it for "pay[ing] little attention to the ecclesial character of sexual ethics" and asked for "a more robust engagement with both the problems and possibilities offered by biblical witness." He hoped the book would "escape the sort of polarized responses that the temper of the times seems to elicit."

On March 29, 2010, the Congregation for the Doctrine of the Faith wrote to Farley, detailing doctrinal problems that it found in Just Love. Farley replied on October 28, 2010. The Congregation considered her response unsatisfactory and, because of the errors it discerned in a book had been "a cause of confusion among the faithful", commissioned the book to be reviewed by experts. On the basis of the experts' evaluation it decided on June 8, 2011, that the book did contain erroneous propositions and requested that she correct those propositions. It received a further response from Farley together with the opinions of her current religious superior and of the superior's predecessor. Considering this further response inadequate, it decided on December 14, 2011, to publish a Notification about what it considered to be problems. The Notification was issued on June 4, 2012, and mentioned specifically her views on "masturbation, homosexual acts, homosexual unions, the indissolubility of marriage and the problem of divorce and remarriage". The Notification concludes:.

With this Notification, the Congregation for the Doctrine of the Faith expresses profound regret that a member of an Institute of Consecrated Life, Sr. Margaret A. Farley, R.S.M., affirms positions that are in direct contradiction with Catholic teaching in the field of sexual morality. The Congregation warns the faithful that her book Just Love: A Framework for Christian Sexual Ethics is not in conformity with the teaching of the Church. Consequently it cannot be used as a valid expression of Catholic teaching, either in counseling and formation, or in ecumenical and interreligious dialogue. Furthermore the Congregation wishes to encourage theologians to pursue the task of studying and teaching moral theology in full concord with the principles of Catholic doctrine.

The congregation thus noted that Farley's teachings were a "defective understanding of the objective nature of natural moral law" and were "in direct contradiction with Catholic teaching in the field of sexual morality" and that such beliefs "pose grave harm" and counter the official teachings and moral tenets of the Roman Catholic Church.

Farley commented that the book offers "contemporary interpretations" of justice and fairness in human sexual relations, moving away from a "taboo morality" and drawing on "present-day scientific, philosophical, theological, and biblical resources." Farley also said: "I can only clarify that the book was not intended to be an expression of current official Catholic teaching, nor was it aimed specifically against this teaching. It is of a different genre altogether."

Farley's religious superior, Patricia McDermott, commented that she was sad that the Vatican had found fault with "the significant pastoral and ethical thinking that are represented in [Farley's] book." The dean of Yale Divinity School, Harold W. Attridge, a Catholic layman, alongside 15 other scholars, issued a statement in support of Farley.

The Holy See's "formal censure" of Farley's work and its statements related to her book, Just Love: A Framework for Christian Sexual Ethics, brought Farley's work wider public attention than she had ever received, "causing it", according to New York Times columnist Maureen Dowd, "to shoot from obscurity to the top tier of Amazon.com's best-seller list". Dowd called the Vatican statement "the latest chapter in the Vatican's thuggish crusade to push American nuns—and all Catholic women—back into moldy subservience." Several news publications both in print and in media maintain that Farley was not writing a book on Catholic catechism, but an ecumenical discussion "distinguishing of practical and speculative questions from [Catholic] magisterial or official teaching."

On June 8, 2012, Farley addressed a session devoted to the Vatican's assessment of her book at the annual meeting of the Catholic Theological Society of America. She said it reflected conflicting understandings of the theologian's role and concluded:

The issue is, finally, in our tradition, is it a contradiction to have power settle questions of truth? Or to say we all have a capacity to know what we ought to do? We can make mistakes, we can disagree—but is it the case that natural law is let go when we really only know the answers because of grace of office? This is a profoundly important question in our tradition today.

The CTSA membership voted "overwhelmingly" in favor of a statement of support for her following her censure by the Vatican.

== Selected works ==
- A Study in the Ethics of Commitment within the Context of Theories of Human Love and Temporality (1978)
- Personal Commitments: Beginning, Keeping, Changing (Harper & Row, 1986)
- Compassionate Respect: A Feminist Approach to Medical Ethics and Other Questions (Paulist, 2002) ISBN 9780809141159
- Just Love: A Framework for Christian Sexual Ethics (Continuum, 2006) ISBN 9780826429247
- Articles
  - "Power and Powerlessness: A Case in Point" (re tubal ligation controversy), Proceedings of the Catholic Theological Society of America, vol. 37 (1982)
  - "Feminist Theology and Bioethics," in Barbara Hilkert Andolsen, Christine E. Gudorf, and Mary D. Pellauer, eds., Women's Consciousness, Women's Conscience: A Reader in Feminist Ethics (Winston Press, 1985), 285–305
  - "Moral Discourse in the Public Arena," in William W. May, ed., Vatican Authority and American Catholic Dissent (Crossroad Publishing, 1987), 168–186
  - "Response to James Hanigan and Charles Curran," in Saul M. Olyan and Martha C. Nussbaum, Sexual Orientation & Human Rights in American Religious Discourse (Oxford University Press, 1998), 101–9
  - Forward, The Patient as Person, Second edition: Exploration in Medical Ethics, 2nd edition (Yale University Press, 2002)
- As editor
  - Margaret A. Farley and Serene Jones, eds., Liberating Eschatology; Essays in Honor of Letty M. Russell (1999)
  - Charles E. Curran, Richard A. McCormick, and Margaret A. Farley, eds., Feminist Ethics and the Catholic Moral Tradition (Paulist Press, 1996)
