= Heavenly Bodies: Fashion and the Catholic Imagination =

Exhibition at the Metropolitan Museum of Art

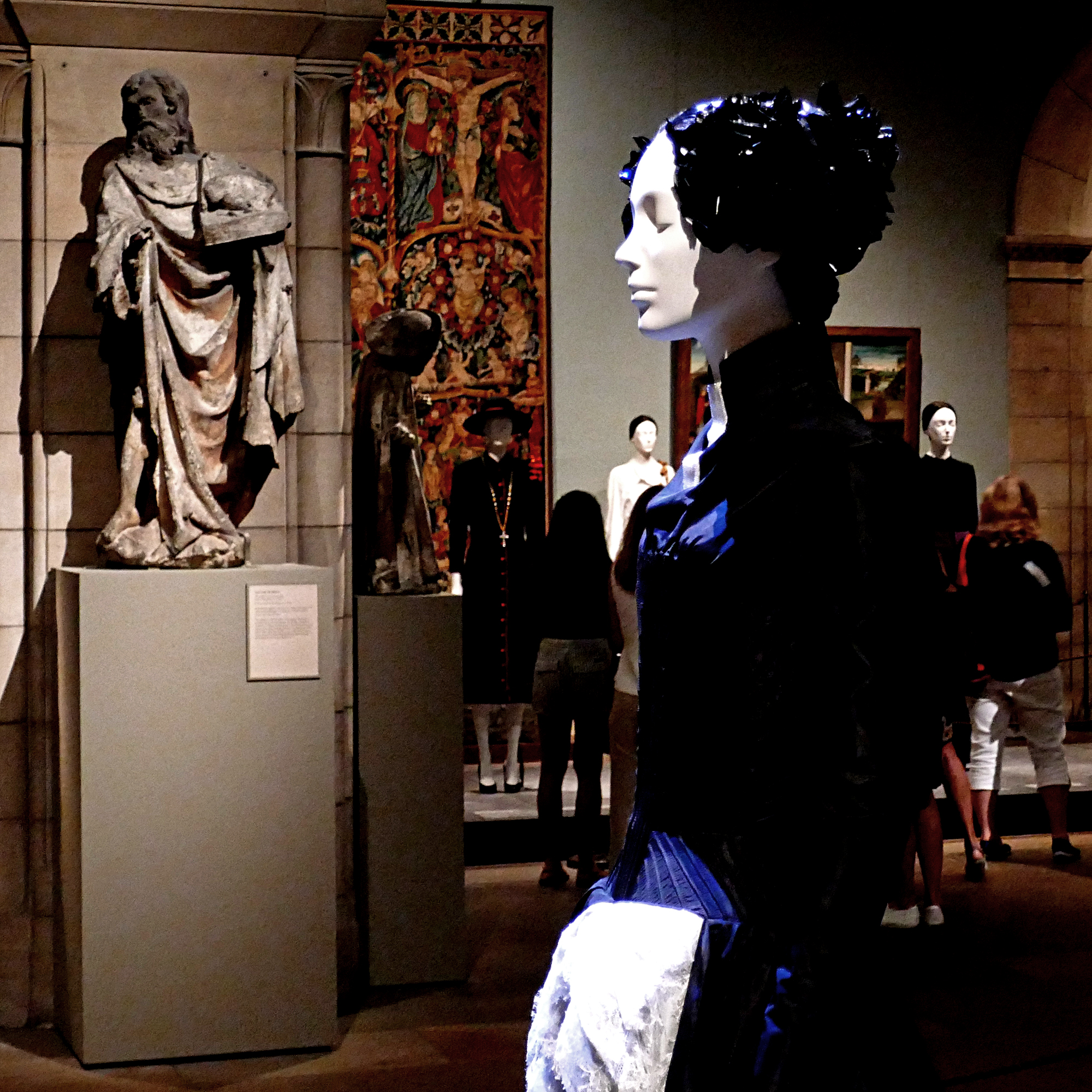
Alexander McQueen Evening Ensemble, Spring / Summer 1999 Collection at The Metropolitan Museum of Art

Heavenly Bodies: Fashion and the Catholic Imagination was the 2018 high fashion art exhibition of the Anna Wintour Costume Center, a wing of The Metropolitan Museum of Art (MMA) which houses the collection of the Costume Institute.

The exhibition was held at The Metropolitan Museum of Art from May 10 to October 8, 2018. 1,659,647 people viewed the exhibit, making it the most visited exhibition in the museum's history. The exhibition featured approximately 40 ecclesiastical works from the Sistine Chapel, which were never seen outside the Vatican, surpassing the museum's previous exhibition in 1983 entitled "The Vatican Collections: The Papacy and Art." The exhibition also featured more than 150 ensembles of secular clothing from the 20th century. The dress code for the annual Met Gala held on May 7, 2018, was "Heavenly Bodies: Fashion and the Catholic Imagination" to highlight the influence of religion and liturgical vestments on fashion from designers such as Donatella Versace, and Cristóbal Balenciaga.

== Exhibition design ==
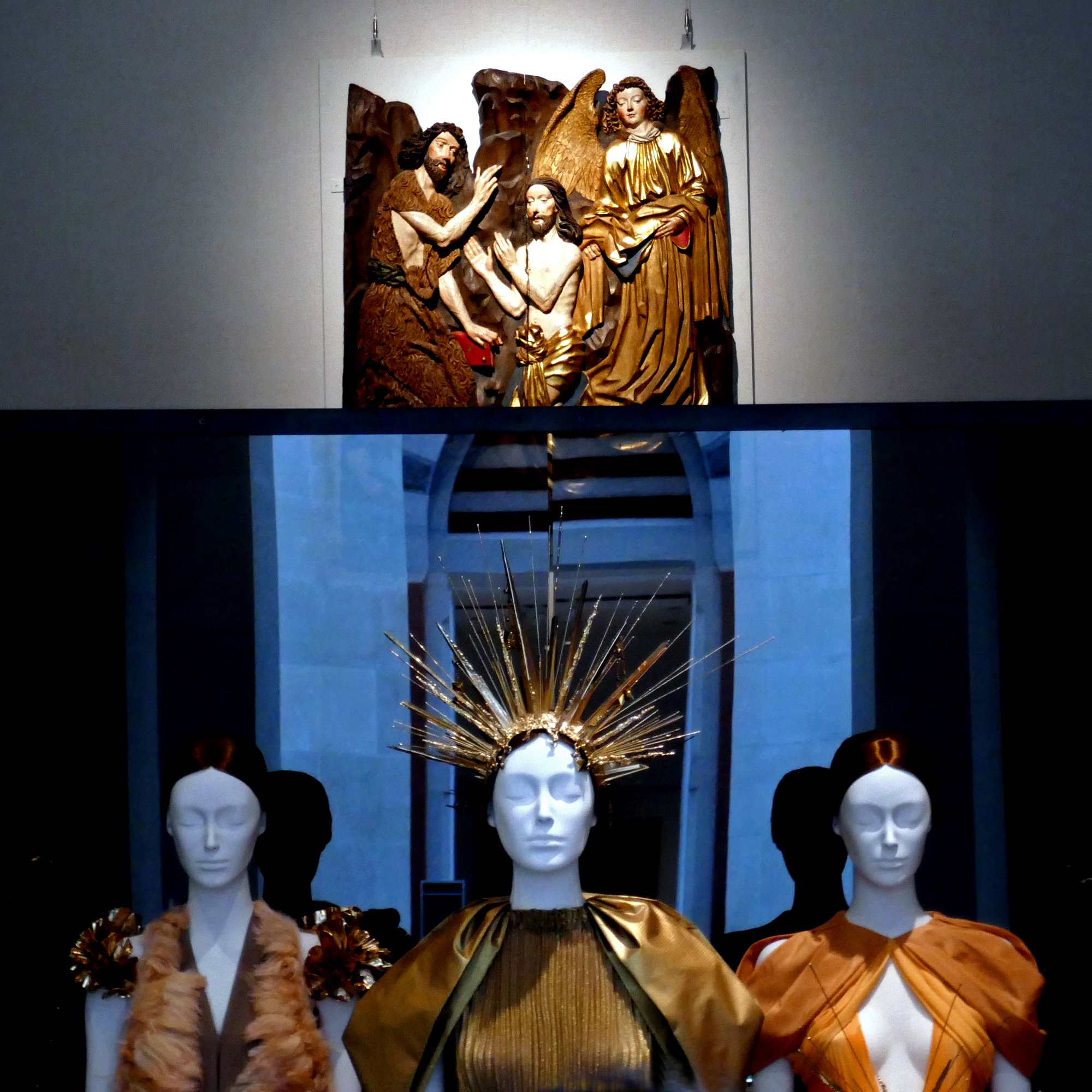
Heavenly Bodies: Fashion and the Catholic Imagination at The Metropolitan Museum of Art

Andrew Bolton, the Curator in Charge of The Costume Institute since 2015, spoke of the intention behind the exhibition: "Throughout the history of the Catholic Church, dress has affirmed religious allegiances, asserted religious differences, and functioned to distinguish hierarchies as well as gender. Although some might regard fashion as a frivolous pursuit far removed from the sanctity of religion, most of the vestments worn by the secular clergy and religious orders of the Catholic Church actually have their origins in secular dress." The exhibition was to display the interaction between art, fashion, and religion throughout time, as Daniel H. Weiss, President and CEO of The Met stated, "The Catholic imagination is rooted in and sustained by artistic practice, and fashion's embrace of sacred images, objects, and customs continues the ever-evolving relationship between art and religion." Vanessa Friedman of The New York Times commented that "in Catholicism the ritual of getting dressed, the pageantry of dress, is part of its identity and history."

Heavenly Bodies was the largest exhibition ever offered by the Met's Costume Institute and featured over 55 designers. The exhibition was divided into two locations: The Met Fifth Avenue and The Met Cloisters. It ran from its dedicated downstairs hall to the Byzantine and medieval galleries and into the Lehman Wing; it then continued at the Cloisters, the museum's serene home for religious art in Upper Manhattan. The exhibition span 60,000 square feet and 25 galleries. Displays of these garments were showcased throughout multiple locations in the museum to "evoke the concept and practice of pilgrimage." It took 12 trips to the Vatican for Bolton to present the idea and win over members of Pope Francis' inner circle to participate with the exhibition. All of the Vatican-approved pieces included in the exhibition were encased in cubes in the Anna Wintour Costume Center and were not exhibited with any unique fashion per the orders of Rome.

Roman Catholic priest and American theologist David Tracy contributed to the exhibition's catalog with a preface, stating that "The highly visual culture of Catholicism is a natural influence for all manner of artists, fashion designers not exempted." Tracy also countered criticism of the exhibition's theming by arguing "Christianity cannot in fact be understood if one ignores the beauty and goodness in all creation or the tragic elements of suffering, evil and sin in all life. That is the Catholic analogical imagination."

In May 2024, Chantal Fernandez reported through The Cut that Bolton originally conceived the show's theme to be around multiple faiths but later realized that the designers who most interested him such as Galliano, McQueen, and Browne were all Catholic. Bolton originally intended to focus on the relationship between costume and each of the "five world religions" Judaism, Buddhism, Hinduism, Islam, and Christianity. According to The Cut, Versace agreed it would sponsor the entire budget of the exhibition if the show aligned with the brand founder's focus on Christian iconography, prompting the narrower theme. A former employee alleged to the publication that the offer from the brand influenced the decision for the theme: "I don't want to say they decided that in the end, but it was a contributing factor." However, Fernandez states a representative for the museum disagreed with this report but did not elaborate further.

== Met Gala ==
The Costume Institute at the Metropolitan Museum of Art inaugurates its annual exhibition with a formal benefit dinner at The Costume Institute Benefit, also informally known as the 'Met Gala'. The event is The Costume Institute's main source of annual funding for exhibitions, publications, acquisitions, and capital improvements. While raising money for the institute, the gala instates a different 'theme' every year corresponding to the Costume Institute's primary exhibition, where guests are encouraged to showcase different interpretations of the exhibition through their designs. For 2018's gala, the dress code was allegedly described as "Sunday Best" and modesty was recommended in view of the exhibition's links with the Church. The annual gala for the Heavenly Bodies exhibition took place on May 7, 2018. The event's co-chairs were human rights lawyer Amal Clooney, singer Rihanna, designer Donatella Versace, and chief Anna Wintour. Investors Christine and Stephen A. Schwarzman served as Honorary Chairs of the gala alongside the Versace fashion house.

Looks from actress Blake Lively, actress Zendaya, singer Ariana Grande, model Gigi Hadid, singer Rihanna, singer Lana Del Rey, rapper Cardi B, actor Chadwick Boseman, and singer SZA were widely touted as the best-dressed at the gala across numerous publications such as Vogue, Vanity Fair and Harper's Bazaar. Their looks have been featured in numerous subsequent exhibitions, such as 'Crown to Couture' at Kensington Palace and 'DIVA' at the Victoria and Albert Museum. During the red carpet many attendees wore crowns, wings, Vatican yellow and Papal red to incorporate and reflect religious inspirations into their attire. Retrospective reviews after the gala have hailed the theme as "arguably the best-executed."

== Critical reception ==
The exhibition received widespread critical acclaim upon opening across major publications such as The Wall Street Journal, The Cut, New York Post, and The New York Times. Laura Jacobs from the Wall Street Journal labelled the exhibition as "A gift from the Sartorial Gods [...] an idea so right, so inevitably majestic, that it's amazing it never happened here before." Rhonda Garelick from The Cut also praised the exhibition, "It's gorgeous, moving, and surprisingly witty [...] It confirms the historical, even mystical power of fashion, its worthiness of serious attention." Raquel Laneri of the New York Post said: "Art lovers already know the Metropolitan Museum is heaven on Earth. But its new exhibit [...] should convert everyone else." Candace Mixon described the experience of the exhibition as "The crowds and cameras made it feel like a visit to a grand cathedral in Europe, with tourists packed in, moving through in awe."

However, Connie Wang writing for Refinery29 critiqued the exhibition's lack of diversity, stating that the exhibit focused nearly entirely on Western Catholicism, with only three non-European or non-American names within the showcase. Wang also critiqued the focus on the influence of religion on fashion, stating that "It is the rejection of Catholicism — and the ideas of perpetual tradition, rigid hierarchy, and unquestioning duty it's become to be associated with — that is the stronger font of fashion creativity."

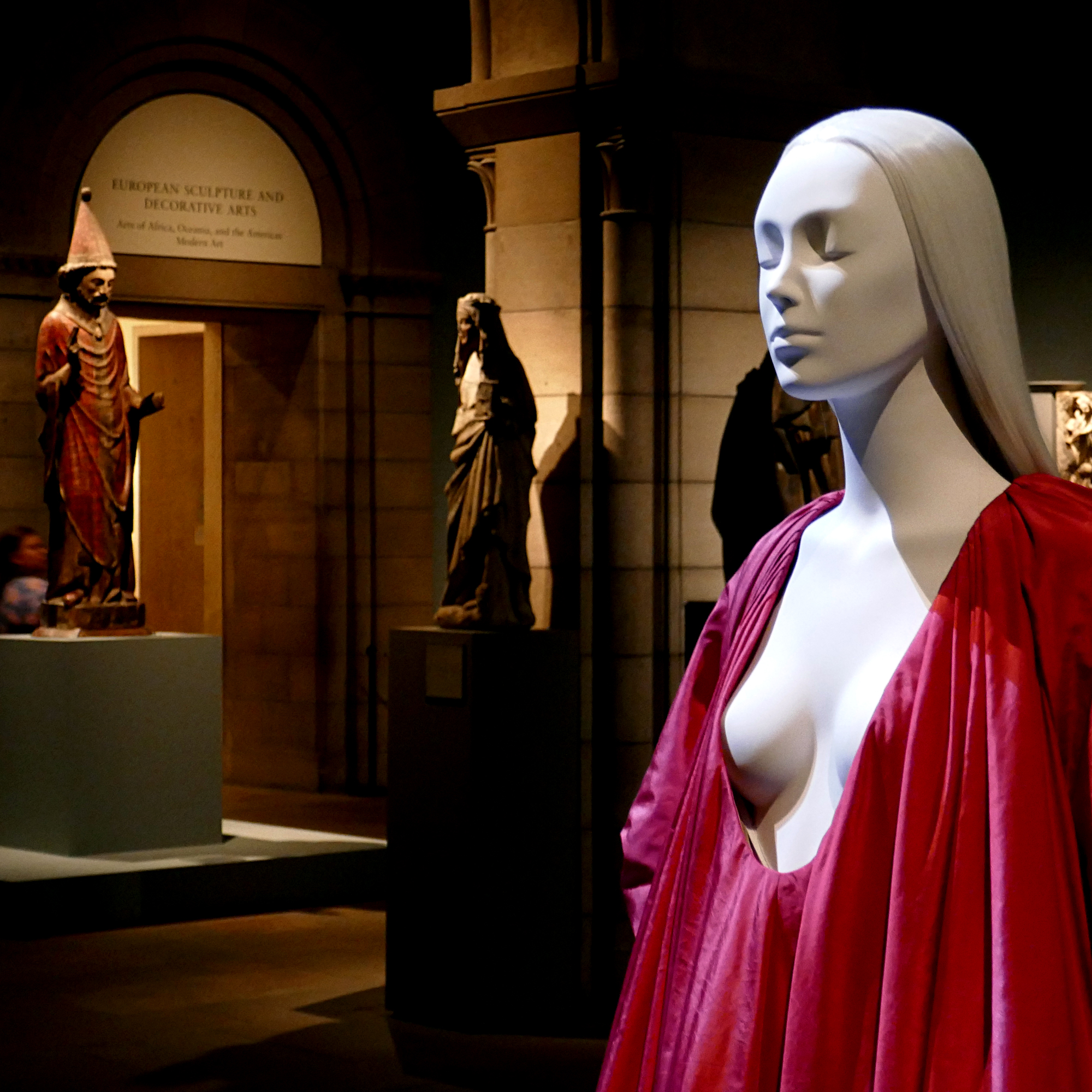
Valentino Evening Dress, Autumn/Winter 2017/18 Collection at The Metropolitan Museum of Art

The exhibition was also met with controversy from members of the Catholic Church who viewed the exhibition to be blasphemous and exploitative of Catholicism. On June 9, 2018, nearly 500 Catholics gathered for a rally in front of the Metropolitan Museum of Art on Fifth Avenue in New York City to oppose and make reparations for the exhibition. The rally for reparation took place roughly a block in front of the museum. Protestors included holding signs and banners with statements such as "STOP BLASPHEMING THE BLESSED VIRGIN MARY," "Lay Catholics offer reparation for the sacrilegious Met Heavenly Bodies," and "Cardinal Dolan: Mixing sin and sanctity is a sacrilege." Similarly, John Horvat II, a spokesperson for the American Society for the Defense of Tradition, Family and Property (TFP) stated: "Catholics nationwide were indignant over this show which mixed sacred symbols and Catholic imagery with immodest haute couture fashion. The Gala event inaugurating the exhibition on May 7 added insult to injury with a show of scantily clad celebrities in religious-themed clothes".

== Exhibition designers ==
The designers who contributed to the exhibition included:

- A.F.Vandevorst
- Azzedine Alaïa
- Cristobal Balenciaga
- Geoffrey Beene
- Marc Bohan (for House of Dior)
- Thom Browne
- Roberto Capucci
- Jean-Charles de Castelbajac
- Gabrielle Chanel
- Sorelle Fontana
- Domenico Dolce and Stefano Gabbana (for Dolce & Gabbana)
- John Galliano (for House of Dior and his own label)
- Jean Paul Gaultier
- Robert Goossens (for Chanel and Yves Saint Laurent)
- Craig Green
- Madame Grès (Alix Barton)
- Demna Gvasalia (for Balenciaga)
- Rosella Jardini (for Moschino)
- Stephen Jones
- Christian Lacroix
- Karl Lagerfeld (for House of Chanel)
- Jeanne Lanvin
- Shaun Leane
- Henri Matisse
- Claire McCardell
- Laura and Kate Mulleavy (for Rodarte)
- Thierry Mugler
- Rick Owens
- Carli Pearson (for Cimone)
- Maria Grazia Chiuri and Pierpaolo Piccioli (for Valentino)
- Pierpaolo Piccioli (for Valentino)
- Stefano Pilati (for Saint Laurent)
- Gareth Pugh
- Yves Saint Laurent
- Elsa Schiaparelli
- Raf Simons (for his own label and House of Dior)
- Viktor Horsting and Rolf Snoeren (for Viktor & Rolf)
- Olivier Theyskens
- Riccardo Tisci
- Jun Takahashi (for Undercover)
- Thea Bregazzi and Justin Thornton (for Preen)
- Philip Treacy
- Duke Fulco di Verdura (for Gabrielle Chanel)
- Donatella Versace (for Versace)
- Gianni Versace
- Valentina
