= Roberto S. Goizueta =

Cuban-American Catholic theologian (born 1954)

- Born: Roberto Segundo Goizueta; December 8, 1954 (age 71); Havana, Cuba
- Education: Yale University; Marquette University
- Occupation: Theologian
- Parent(s): Roberto Goizueta; Olguita Casteleiro

Roberto Segundo Goizueta (born December 8, 1954) is a Cuban-American Catholic theologian currently holding the Margaret O'Brien Flatley Chair in Catholic Theology at Boston College. Some of his specialties include Latino(a) theology and Christology.

== Education and background ==
Roberto Segundo Goizueta was born in Havana, Cuba, on December 8, 1954. At the age of six he immigrated to the United States, where he attended high school in Atlanta, Georgia. He attended Yale University and graduated with a B.A. in political science. After a short time in law school, he chose to attend Marquette University and pursue an M.A. and Ph.D. in Systematic Theology in 1984, Goizueta was named one of the 10 most influential Hispanic-American educators, pastors, and theologians by The National Catholic Reporter. His works have focused on theological aesthetics, liberation theology, and Latino theology.

== Career ==
Goizueta has received many awards and titles throughout his career. He was named Doctor of Humane Letters (honoris causa) at Elms College as well as Doctor of Humane Letters (honoris causa) at the University of San Francisco. He once acted as president of both the Catholic Theological Society of America (2004–2005) and the Academy of Catholic Hispanic Theologians of the United States (1990–1991). In addition to being president, Goizueta was also a board member of the Catholic Society of America from 1998 to 2000. In 1996, he received the honor of being the recipient of the Virgilio Elizondo Award, awarded by the Academy of Catholic Hispanic Theologians of the United States. He is currently a professor at Boston College teaching courses in liberation theology, liberation christology, person and social responsibility, theology and culture, theological aesthetics, and U.S. Latino/a theology. His concentrations and field of interests include Latino/a theologies, theology and culture, theological aesthetics, and christology.

=== Latino theology and Christology ===
Goizueta focuses on Latino theology within a liberative and aesthetic context. In addition, he analyzes challenges to modern day theologies and compares the theological praxis of Latino Americans to others.

Goitzueta sees U.S. Latino theology as marginalized by modern-day Western theology, by both theological and societal factors. In today's homogenized world, it is a constant challenge for unique cultures and practices to have prominence in such a world. If they are able to break this barrier, it is an even greater challenge to integrate without losing the distinctive qualities of one's practice (in his case, Latino theology) to the homogenization/Americanization/Westernization that much of the world is subjugated to. In comparing Western praxis to U.S. Latino praxis, Goizueta asserts that the "Western subject forges a self-identity by distancing himself or herself from community and tradition in order to achieve autonomy and independence" (92). Conversely, U.S. Latinos focus their identity on tradition, rituals, and community. While Western praxis has been derived from notions developed during the Enlightenment as more a "superstitious attempt at spiritual manipulation", U.S. Latinos see praxis as a way of reaffirmation ones relationship with God (92). Anglican theologies are the most prominent because they have been accepted as the universal in their rational nature. Many important aspects of Catholicism have been lost in today's world as a result, but U.S. Latino theology, he argues, maintains many of these aspects.

Goizueta sees dialogue as a means of liberation in that Latino Theologies, feminist theology, African American theology, etc. have been contextualized and forced out from the broader theological scene as western theologies are seen as more universal and objective. Goizueta believes that the inherent communal nature of Christianity and obligation to understanding and acceptance is something contextualized theologies (such as Latino theology) must use to reflect their importance to the greater community.

In his book Caminemos con Jesus, Goizueta analyzes the lived faith, or popular religion, of Latinos in the United States. He specifically delves into the theology behind Holy week and the significance of Our Lady of Guadalupe. He says that Latinos are the fastest growing ethnic group in the United States, and that one-third of Catholics in the United States are Latino. Also in this book, He asks the question "Who is the God revealed in the practices of U.S. Catholics?" He sees God, and more specifically Jesus, as a companion for all, but in a special way for the poor and marginalized. This Jesus, or Christo compañero, calls people and empowers people to work for justice. Goizueta also says that the bonds of solidarity found between Latinos help affirm humanity in the face of social forces that would dehumanize them.

== Personal life ==
Goizueta is married and has three children.

== Writings ==
=== Books ===
- Caminemos con Jesús: Toward a Hispanic/Latino Theology of Accompaniment;
- Christ our Companion: Toward a Theological Aesthetics of Liberation. Maryknoll, NY: Orbis Books, 2009;
- Hispanic Christian Thought at the Dawn of the 21st Century, co-edited with Alvin Padilla and Eldin Villafañe. Nashville: Abingdon Press, 2005.

=== Articles and chapters ===
- "The Church: A Latino Catholic Perspective" in Benjamin Valentín, In Our Own Voices: Latino/a Renditions of Theology. Maryknoll, NY: Orbis Books, 2010.
- "Corpus Verum: Toward a Borderland Ecclesiology" in Orlando O. Espín, ed., Building Bridges, Doing Justice: Constructing a Latino/a Ecumenical Theology. Maryknoll, NY: Orbis Books, 2009.
- "Resisting the Frontier, Meeting at the Border" in Michael G. Long, ed., Resist! Christian Dissent for the 21st Century. Maryknoll, NY: Orbis Books, 2008.
- "Rouault's Christ: A Call to Aesthetic Conversion." In Stephen Schloesser, ed., Mystic Masque: Semblance and Reality in Georges Rouault, 1871–1958. McMullen Museum of Art, Boston College/University of Chicago Press, 2008.
- "An Integral Theology, an Integral Faith." Pedro Hugues and Consuelo de Prado, eds., Libertad y Esperanza: A Gustavo Gutiérrez por sus 80 años. Lima, Perú: Instituto Bartolomé de las Casas, 2008.
- "The Christology of Jon Sobrino." In Stephen J. Pope, ed., Hope and Solidarity: Jon Sobrino's Challenge to Christian Theology. Maryknoll, NY: Orbis Books, 2008.
- "Liberalism," "Liberation Theology." In William A. Dyrness and Veli-Matti Kärkkäinen, Global Dictionary of Theology. Downers Grove, IL: InterVarsity Press, 2008.
- "Challenges of/to the U.S. Latino/a Liturgical Community." Liturgical Ministry 16 (Summer 2007): 124–131.
- "Reconciliation and the Refusal to Cease Suffering." The Msgr. Philip J. Murnion Lecture of the Catholic Common Ground Initiative. New York: National Pastoral Life Center, 2006.
- "From Calvary to Galilee" [abridged version of CTSA presidential address]. America. April 17, 2006.
- "The Crucified and Risen Christ: From Calvary to Galilee." Presidential Address, in Proceedings of the Catholic Theological Society of America 60 (2005): 57–71.
- "Beyond the Frontier Myth [reprint]." In Hispanic Christian Thought at the Dawn of the 21st Century, co-edited with Alvin Padilla and Eldin Villafañe. Nashville: Abingdon Press, 2005.
- "Because God is Near, God is Real." In Peter Horsfield, Mary Hess, and Adán Medrano, eds., Belief in Media: Cultural Perspectives on Media and Christianity. London: Ashgate, 2004.
- "The Eye With Which God Looks at You." In Elizabeth T. Goizueta, ed. Matta: Making the Invisible Visible, pp. 41–47. Chestnut Hill, MA: The McMullen Museum of Art at Boston College/University of Chicago Press, 2004.
- "The Symbolic Realism of U.S. Latino/a Popular Catholicism." Theological Studies 65, no. 2 (June 2004): 255–274.
- "Gustavo Gutiérrez." In Peter Scott and William T. Cavanaugh, eds., The Blackwell Companion to Political Theology, pp. 288–301. Oxford: Blackwell Publishing, 2004.
- "Knowing the God of the Poor: The Preferential Option for the Poor." In Joerg Rieger, ed., Opting for the Margins: Postmodernity and Liberation in Christian Theology, pp. 143–156. New York: Oxford University Press, 2003.
- "Catholicism in America." In Gary Laderman and Luis León, eds., Religion and American Cultures: An Encyclopedia of Traditions, Diversity, and Popular Expression, 3 Vols. Vol. 1, pp. 75–81. Santa Barbara, CA: ABC-CLIO, 2003.
- "Our Lady of Guadalupe: The Heart of Mexican Identity." In Craig R. Prentiss, ed. Religion and the Creation of Race and Identity, pp. 140–151. New York and London: New York University Press, 2003.
- "The Symbolic World of Mexican American Religion." In Timothy Matovina and Gary Riebe-Estrella, eds. Horizons of the Sacred: Mexican Traditions in U.S. Catholicism, pp. 119–138. Ithaca and London: Cornell University Press, 2002.
- "U.S. Latino/a Theology: Retrospect and Prospect." Introductory essay for Raúl Fornet-Betancourt, ed. Glaube an der Grenze: Die US-amerikanische Latino-Theologie. Theologie der Dritten Welt, Band 29. Freiburg: Herder, 2002.
- "Rediscovering Praxis" [German translation of my previously published article]. In Raúl Fornet-Betancourt, ed. Glaube an der Grenze: Die US-amerikanische Latino-Theologie. Theologie der Dritten Welt, Band 29. Freiburg: Herder, 2002.
