= Sandra M. Schneiders =

American theologian and scholar

Sandra M. Schneiders IHM
- Born: November 12, 1936 (age 90); Chicago, IL
- Occupations: Biblical scholar, Theologian
- Years active: 1976–
- Awards: Yves Congar Award for Theological Excellence (2014) LCWR Outstanding Leadership Award (2012) John Courtney Murray Award (2006)

Academic background
- Education: Pontifical Gregorian University, Rome
- Influences: Paul Ricœur, Raymond E. Brown

Academic work
- Discipline: New Testament, Biblical Exegesis, Hermeneutics, Spirituality Studies
- Sub-discipline: Gospel of John, Feminist Exegesis
- Institutions: Jesuit School of Theology of Santa Clara University
- Notable works: The Revelatory Text

Sandra Marie Schneiders, I.H.M., is an American biblical scholar, theologian, and Catholic radical feminist . She is a member of the Sisters, Servants of the Immaculate Heart of Mary of Monroe, Michigan, and a professor emerita of New Testament Studies and Christian Spirituality at the Jesuit School of Theology of Santa Clara University.

== Education and Career ==
Sandra Schneiders was born in Chicago, the second of seven children. Her father, a professor of psychology, and her mother, a homemaker and academic secretary, fostered an environment that valued both intellectual work and faith.

After completing her first year of college at St. Joseph’s in Maryland, she entered the I.H.M. congregation in 1955, fulfilling what she describes as a lifelong certainty about her vocation. She continued her undergraduate studies at Marygrove College, majoring in sociology and social sciences. While already teaching, she completed her graduate studies at the University of Detroit. In 1968, her congregation sent her to Paris to complete her education with a Licentiate in Theology from the Institut catholique.

Upon her return, she resumed her teaching at Marygrove College, this time as a professor of theology, before traveling to Rome to pursue a doctorate in Sacred Theology at the Gregorian University. Specializing in biblical studies, she developed a particular expertise in the Gospel of John and biblical hermeneutics. Her research interests also expanded to spirituality, with a focus on the history and theology of religious life.

With her theological training complete, Dr. Schneiders moved to California, where she has served since 1976 as a professor of New Testament Studies and Spirituality at the Jesuit School of Theology at Berkeley (now part of Santa Clara University and member of the Graduate Theological Union). There, she has played a key role in advancing the study of Christian spirituality as an academic field.

In 1990, Schneiders was among the signatories of the pastoral letter "A Call for Reform in the Catholic Church," which advocated for structural evolutions within the Church. In 2006, a volume of essays was published in her honor.

== Theological Views ==
One of Schneiders’ central contributions is her analysis of the revelatory function of Scripture. Rather than viewing the Bible solely as an ancient document, she explores how it serves as a medium through which contemporary readers encounter divine revelation. Drawing on philosophical hermeneutics, particularly the work of Gadamer and Ricœur, Schneiders argues that understanding Scripture entails a fusion of horizons—the interplay between the world of the text and the world of the reader.

Accordingly, Schneiders proposes a hermeneutical model that integrates historical-critical method and literary criticism with an appropriative (or transformative) dimension. The effect of Scripture on its readers, she contends, deserves scholarly attention equal to that given to its historical origins. On this view, purely historical approaches risk overlooking the relationship between text and interpreter. Schneiders critiques both fundamentalist readings that ignore historical complexity and strictly historical-critical methods that fail to account for the text’s power to shape the reader’s lived experience.

For Schneiders, interpreting Scripture is an experiential and transformative process that includes, but ultimately transcends, intellectual analysis. Believers engage the text existentially, in ways that inform their spiritual lives and shape their faith commitments. She seeks to reclaim a tradition that understands Scripture as formative as well as informative.

Schneiders’ overall scholarship also reflects a feminist hermeneutical orientation, interrogating patriarchal assumptions embedded in traditional biblical interpretation. Schneiders attends to the ethical dimensions of scriptural engagement and advocates for interpretive approaches that create space for marginalized voices.

== Selected works ==
- Jesus Risen in Our Midst: Essays on the Resurrection of Jesus in the Fourth Gospel. Liturgical Press, 2013.
- Beyond Patching: Faith and Feminism in the Catholic Church. 2nd edition. Paulist Press, 2004.
- Written That You May Believe: Encountering Jesus in the Fourth Gospel. Revised and Expanded Edition. Crossroad, 2003.
- Selling All: Commitment, Consecrated Celibacy, and Community in Catholic Religious Life. Religious Life in a New Millennnium, vol. 2. Paulist Press, 2001.
- Finding the Treasure: Locating Catholic Religious Life in a New Ecclesial and Cultural Context. Religious Life in a New Millennium, vol. 1. Paulist Press, 2000.
- The Revelatory Text: Interpreting the New Testament as Sacred Scripture. 2nd edition. Liturgical Press, 1999.
- Women and the Word: The Gender of God in the New Testament and the Spirituality of Women. Paulist Press, 1986.
