= Roger Haight =

American Jesuit theologian (1936–2025)

The Reverend Roger Haight SJ
- Born: April 30, 1936; Glen Ridge, New Jersey
- Died: June 19, 2025 (aged 89); New York City
- Education: Berchmans College, Cebu City; Woodstock College, Maryland; University of Chicago (PhD)
- Theological work
- Era: Post-Vatican II; 20th-century philosophy
- Tradition or movement: Society of Jesus; Catholic church
- Main interests: Christology, World religions, Postmodernism
- Notable ideas: Jesus Symbol of God; The Future of Christology; Alternate Vision: An Interpretation of Liberation Theology; Spiritual and Religious: Explorations for Seekers

Roger Haight SJ (April 30, 1936 – June 19, 2025) was an American Jesuit theologian and president of the Catholic Theological Society of America. His experiences with censorship led to widespread debate over how to handle controversial ideas in the Catholic church today.

== Biography ==
He was born in Glen Ridge, New Jersey on April 30, 1936. A member of the Jesuits, Haight received his BA (1960) and an MA in Philosophy (1961) from Berchmans College in Cebu City, Philippines; his STB from Woodstock College, Maryland (1967); an MA in Theology (1969) and a PhD in Theology (1973) from the University of Chicago; and the STL from the Jesuit School of Theology at Chicago.

Haight was the recipient of the Alumnus of the Year award from the Divinity School of the University of Chicago in April 2006. He taught at the Jesuit graduate schools of theology in Manila, Chicago, Toronto, and Cambridge, Massachusetts. He was also a visiting professor at universities in Lima, Nairobi, Paris, and in the Indian city of Pune.

In 2004, the Vatican's Congregation for the Doctrine of the Faith (CDF) barred Haight from teaching at the Weston School of Theology in response to questions about his book Jesus Symbol of God (Orbis, 1999). The book is the winner of the 1999 top prize in theology from the Catholic Press Association.

In September 2004, Haight began teaching at Union Theological Seminary, a leading multi-denominational seminary, as an adjunct professor of theology. In 2005, he wrote The Future of Christology in response to questions and concerns about Jesus Symbol of God.

In January 2009, the CDF barred Haight from writing on theology and forbade him to teach anywhere, including non-Catholic institutions. However, he remained at Union Theological Seminary as a scholar in residence, focused on the adaptation of Ignatius' Spiritual Exercises for "seekers" today.

In 2015, the era of Pope Francis, Haight was somewhat reinstated, teaching at the Jesuit theologate in Toronto. He had published, in 2014, An Alternate Vision: An Interpretation of Liberation Theology. He also contributed to the Sisters of the Holy Name of Jesus and Mary series commemorating 50 years after Vatican II, with an interview on "Spirituality Today for all Seekers: The Gift of the Spiritual Exercises for All Seekers", which addresses the question of how to connect with the spirituality of people who do not consider themselves religious. In 2016, he published Spiritual and Religious: Explorations for Seekers, and in 2017 his "Theology of the Cross" was the topic of an article in the English Jesuit Heythrop Journal. In 2019, he published Faith and Evolution: A Grace-Filled Naturalism (Orbis, 2019), described by George V. Coyne as "an original and rich contribution to the growing field of studies within the Christian tradition on the dynamic relationship among the natural sciences, theology, and religious faith."

Haight received the John Courtney Murray Award from the Catholic Theological Society of America in 2023.

Haight died in New York City on June 19, 2025, at the age of 89.

== Critiques of Jesus Symbol of God ==
The CDF objected to Haight's theological method, his assertions about the divinity of Jesus and his resurrection, and his interpretation of other key Catholic dogmas such as the Trinity. The clarifications Haight provided in 2000 were judged unsatisfactory by the CDF and in January 2001 it initiated a formal investigation which led to his 2004 removal from Catholic universities and 2009 complete prohibition from teaching and writing.

In 2005, John Allen, after a long review of diverse responses to Haight's Jesus Symbol of God, described it as "a work of vast erudition", and concluded:

The theological community appears divided over the Vatican's recent censure of Jesuit Fr. Roger Haight. Citing "grave doctrinal errors" in Haight's book Jesus Symbol of God, the Congregation for the Doctrine of the Faith issued a notification banning the priest from teaching Catholic theology. While some see Haight's "Christology from below" as a courageous exploration of new horizons, others see it as a cautionary tale about what happens when the culture becomes the lens for reading the Gospel rather than vice versa. Some who fault Haight have included those who have been critical of Vatican treatment of other theologians, but reluctantly concede that the congregation's notification of Haight may be justified, or at least expected.

Scholars are divided on whether the Vatican's reaction is counterproductive by ending debate within scholarly circles or whether it was necessary since Haight's ideas were being taught at a popular level.

In 2009, after the complete silencing of Haight, a response in the Jesuits' America magazine mentioned the usefulness of certain chapters of Jesus Symbol of God and that silencing interrupts the helpful process of scholarly criticism. The silencing received widespread coverage.
