= Economic Justice for All =

1986 pastoral letter by the USCCB

"Economic Justice for All" is the pastoral letter promulgated by the United States Conference of Catholic Bishops in 1986. It deals with the U.S. economy and with Catholic social teaching in the U.S. context. It is a part of the tradition of Catholic social teaching. The letter was written at a time when the Reagan administration was implementing policies of laissez-faire capitalism, and it may be interpreted as a reaction to what was seen as hostility towards the Catholic Church's teachings on distributism, subsidiarity, and social justice.

Archbishop Rembert Weakland was asked to chair the U.S. bishops' committee responsible for drafting the pastoral letter. He terms the experience "one of the most important and formative periods of my life".
