= Joseph A. Komonchak =

American theologian and Catholic priest

The Reverend Joseph Komonchak
- Born: March 13, 1939 (age 86); Nyack, New York, U.S.
- Education: Gregorian University; Union Theological Seminary
- Occupation(s): Professor, theologian, historian
- Notable work: History of Vatican II; The New Dictionary of Theology
- Theological work
- Era: Second Vatican Council
- Notable ideas: The local church as conceived by Vatican II

Joseph Andrew Komonchak (born on March 13, 1939) is an American Catholic priest and theologian, ordained on 1963 for the Archdiocese of New York. He is Professor Emeritus of the School of Theology and Religious Studies at the Catholic University of America, from which he retired in 2009.

== Biography ==
Komonchak was born in Nyack, New York in 1939. He attended Cathedral Preparatory Seminary/College in Manhattan, and in 1960 received a Bachelor of Sacred Theology degree from Saint Joseph's Seminary in Dunwoodie, Yonkers. He studied at the North American College in Rome, earning a Licentiate of Sacred Theology from the Pontifical Gregorian University in Rome. One of his instructors at the Gregorian was Jesuit theologian Bernard Lonergan, whom Komonchak credited with restoring his faith in the future of Catholic intellectualism.

He received a doctorate from Union Theological Seminary in New York. Ordained in 1963, he did parish work along with college and seminary teaching, before joining the faculty at Catholic University of America in 1977; he had among his students Cardinal Tagle of Manila. He was considered by many as the dean of American ecclesiologists.

Komonchak is a leading interpreter of the Second Vatican Council, co-editor of the English version of the five-volume history of the Council, and the chief editor of The New Dictionary of Theology. In June 2015 he received the John Courtney Murray Award from the Catholic Theological Society of America, the highest honor it bestows.

He served as a consultant to three committees of the National Conference of Catholic Bishops, and published more than 150 articles.
