= Richard McBrien =

American Catholic priest (1936–2015)

The Reverend Richard McBrien
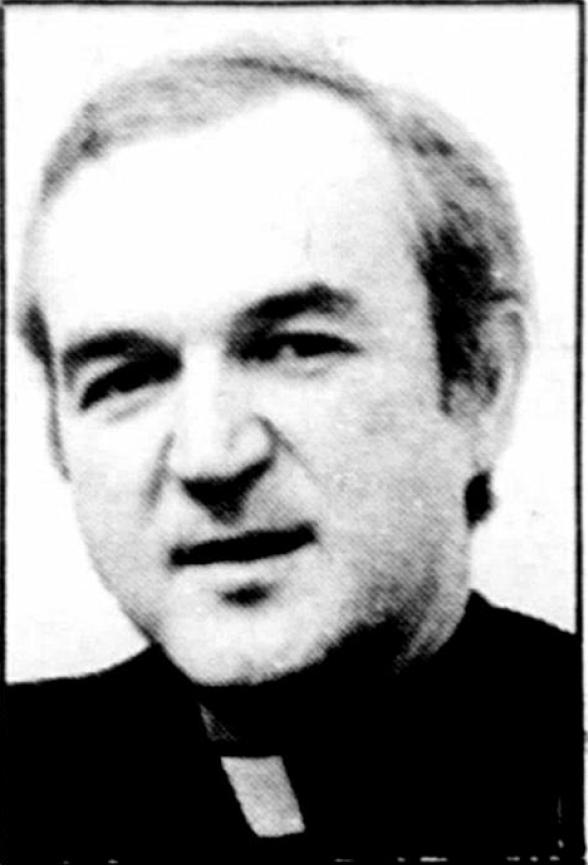
- McBrien sometime in 1989 or earlier
- Born: Richard Peter McBrien; August 19, 1936
- Died: January 25, 2015 (aged 78); Farmington, Connecticut
- Title: Crowley-O'Brien Professor of Theology, University of Notre Dame
- Theology career
- Education: St. Thomas Seminary; St. John's Seminary; Gregorian University
- Occupations: Priest; theologian; writer; professor
- Notable work: Catholicism
- Theological work
- Era: Post-Second Vatican Council
- Main interests: Implementing the Second Vatican Council; Catholic Church renewal
- Notable ideas: Advocated "seamless garment" of social teaching

Richard Peter McBrien (August 19, 1936 – January 25, 2015) was a Catholic priest, theologian, and writer who was the Crowley-O'Brien Professor of Theology at the University of Notre Dame near South Bend, Indiana. He authored twenty-five books, including the popular Catholicism, a reference text on the Church after the Second Vatican Council.

== Life and career ==
Richard P. McBrien was born on August 19, 1936, the fourth of five children of Thomas H. and Catherine (Botticelli) McBrien. His father was a police officer, his mother a nurse. McBrien earned his bachelor's degree at St. Thomas Seminary in Bloomfield, Connecticut, in 1956, and a master's at St. John's Seminary in Brighton, Massachusetts, in 1962. He was ordained as a priest for the Roman Catholic Archdiocese of Hartford in 1962. His first assignment as a priest was at Our Lady of Victory Church in West Haven, Connecticut. McBrien obtained his doctorate in theology from the Pontifical Gregorian University in Rome in 1967. He taught at the Pope John XXIII National Seminary in Weston, Massachusetts.

McBrien authored several books and articles discussing Catholicism. He is known for his authorship of Catholicism. He also served as president of the Catholic Theological Society of America from 1974 to 1975. In 1976 he was the awarded the John Courtney Murray Award for outstanding and distinguished accomplishments in theology. McBrien joined the Notre Dame faculty in 1980, served as chair of the Department of Theology there from 1980 to 1991, and retired in 2013. Prior to going to Notre Dame, McBrien taught at Boston College, where he was director of the Institute of Religious Education and Pastoral Ministry.

McBrien's scholarly interests included ecclesiology, the relationship between religion and politics, and the theological, doctrinal, and spiritual aspects of the Catholic Church. He published 25 books and was the general editor of the Encyclopedia of Catholicism. He also served as an on-air commentator on Catholic events for CBS in addition to his regular contribution as a commentator on several major television networks. McBrien was also a consultant for ABC News. He wrote several essays for the National Catholic Reporter as well as for The Tidings in Los Angeles. He produced a syndicated theological column. "Essays in Theology", for the Catholic press.

Notre Dame professor of theology Brian Daley described McBrien as representing "what had been a pretty widespread point of view among Catholic theologians in the late 60s and 70s: liberal on the 'hot-button' issues, but – as he saw it – still theologically defensible. By the late 80s, though, this approach had definitely become a minority voice."

McBrien died after a lengthy illness at his home in Farmington, Connecticut, on January 25, 2015, at the age of 78.

== Controversies ==
McBrien was a controversial figure in the American Catholic Church, mainly because of conflict surrounding his published works and public remarks.

=== USCCB critique of Catholicism ===
McBrien's Catholicism sold over 150,000 copies in its original two-volume edition in 1980. Together with its revised, one-volume edition (1994), Catholicism was a widely used reference text and found in parish libraries throughout the United States. Catholicism does not bear nihil obstat or imprimatur declarations from the church that state the book is free of moral or doctrinal error.

The United States Conference of Catholic Bishops Committee on Doctrine found that the book "poses pastoral problems particularly as a textbook in undergraduate college courses and in parish education programs", and "as a book for people who are not specialists in theological reasoning and argumentation, Catholicism poses serious difficulties". The committee noted that McBrien had presented some core Catholic teachings as one view among many, instead of as the authoritative views of the church. The USCCB also said that the book contained statements which are "inaccurate or misleading", that it exaggerates "plurality" within the Catholic theological tradition, and that it overemphasizes "change and development" in the history of Catholic doctrine even though official dogmas of the Catholic Church are, according to the magisterium, unchangeable truths. After the USCCB criticism of Catholicism, a number of diocesan newspapers dropped his column.

=== "Seamless garment" ===
In 2004, McBrien wrote a column supporting "Seamless garment" theory propounded by Cardinal Joseph Bernardin of Chicago in 1983, which holds that issues such as abortion, capital punishment, militarism, euthanasia, social injustice, and economic injustice all demand a consistent application of moral principles that value the sacredness of human life. His position prompted criticism from what McBrien characterized as "single-issue, anti-abortion Catholics".

=== Reviews of Encyclopedia of Catholicism ===
McBrien also served as the general editor of The Harper Collins Encyclopedia of Catholicism. According to Thomas Guarino, "one has the impression that it was written for undergraduates who have little or no idea of what was once the common world and parlance of Catholic culture". The review itself elaborates, "It is intended as a handy reference for students or journalists who need a quick and succinct explanation of some Catholic term or practice." It concludes by stating that some "articles are models of precision and succinctness. The better ones include Revelation, Apostolic Succession, Conciliarism, Faith, Hell, Heresy, Homosexuality, Immortality, Inerrancy, Justification, Magisterium, Mary, Purgatory, and the Vicar of Christ. These have the merit of explaining clearly and concisely what the Catholic Church believes and why."

=== Accusation of plagiarism ===
In March 2006, the Cardinal Newman Society sent an allegation of plagiarism against McBrien to the University of Notre Dame, where he taught, the second allegation in three months. McBrien denied having plagiarized, and John Cavadini, chair of Notre Dame's theology department, dismissed the charges raised by the society, which he described as a "militant, right-wing Catholic interest group".

=== Eucharistic adoration ===
In September 2009, McBrien published an article in the National Catholic Reporter in which he criticized the practice of eucharistic adoration by calling it "a doctrinal, theological, and spiritual step backward, not forward".

=== Criticism of popes ===
In a 1991 op-ed piece, McBrien discussed "the prolonged, slow-motion coup that has been under way in the church since the election of Pope John Paul II in October 1978", in which he saw "Ecclesiastical hard-liners, fearful of the loss of power and privilege,... attempting to reverse the new, progressive course set by Pope John XXIII."

During a 1992 talk in Indianapolis, he criticized "current discipline on obligatory celibacy and the ordination of women" and challenged Catholics to take far more seriously the teachings of the church on social justice, service, and evangelization.

In 2012 McBrien told The National Catholic Reporter, "If there are any reasons for the bad patch the church is now going through, it is the appointments to the hierarchy and the promotions within made by John Paul and Benedict. By and large, they have all been conservative."

== Works ==
McBrien's Lives of Saints and Lives of the Popes provided detailed biographical information and discussed the larger religious and historical significance of saints and popes. He later published pocket guides to each of these volumes to supply more accessible information.

- Religion and Politics in America, (1987)
- Lives of the Popes: The Pontiffs from Saint Peter to John Paul II (HarperSanFrancisco, 2000 (revised in 2006), ISBN 0-06-065304-3)
- The Church: The Evolution of Catholicism (2008, ISBN 0-06-124521-6)
- The Pocket Guide to the Popes (HarperSanFrancisco, 2006, ISBN 0-06-113773-1)
- The Pocket Guide to the Saints (HarperSanFrancisco, 2006, ISBN 0-06-113774-X)
- Lives of the Saints: From Mary and St. Francis of Assisi to John XXIII and Mother Teresa (HarperSanFrancisco, 2006, ISBN 0-06-123283-1)
- 101 Questions & Answers on the Church (Paulist Press, 2003, ISBN 0-8091-4250-3)
- Responses to 101 Questions on the Church (Paulist Press, 1996, ISBN 0-8091-3638-4)
- The HarperCollins Encyclopedia of Catholicism (HarperSanFrancisco, 1995, ISBN 0-06-065338-8)
- Inside Catholicism (Signs of the Sacred) (HarperCollins, 1995, ISBN 0-00-649052-2) A Roman Catholic theology, history, and morality.
- How To Give Up Sex (co-authored with Roger Planer and John Riley: Hodder & Stoughton, 1989, ISBN 0-450-49473-X)
- Ministry: A Theological, Pastoral Handbook (HarperSanFrancisco, 1988, ISBN 0-06-065324-8)
- Caesar's Coin: Religion and Politics in America (MacMillan, 1987, ISBN 0-02-919720-1)
- In Search of God (Dimension Books, 1977, ISBN 0-87193-082-X)
- The Remaking of the Church: An Agenda for Reform (Harper & Row, 1973, ISBN 0-06-065327-2)
- For the Inquiring Catholic: Questions and Answers for the 1970s (Dimension Books, 1973)
- Who is a Catholic? (Dimension Books, 1971)
- Church: The Continuing Quest (Paulist Press, 1970, ISBN 0-8091-1525-5)
- The Church in the Thought of Bishop John Robinson (Westminster Press 1966, SCM Press 1966)
- The papers of R. McBrien are held in the Hesburgh Library Archives at Notre Dame: https://archivesspace.library.nd.edu/repositories/2/resources/894

=== The Da Vinci Code ===
McBrien served as a paid consultant for the film The Da Vinci Code.
