= Richard A. McCormick =

Jesuit moral theologian (1922–2000)

Richard A. McCormick SJ (1922 – February 12, 2000) was a leading Catholic moral theologian who reshaped Catholic thought in the United States. He wrote many journal articles on Catholic social teachings and moral theory.

He was an expert in Catholic medical ethics and for many years wrote the "Notes on Moral Theology" column in Theological Studies. He was "particularly articulate" among the five moral theologians who in 1964 at the Kennedy Compound crafted a political position for the Kennedy clan that would permit abortion in law.

Joining the Jesuits in 1940, he was ordained a priest in 1953. During his career, he served as a professor of Christian ethics at the University of Notre Dame and Georgetown.

In an article in America magazine (July 17, 1993), McCormick wrote that the prohibition of any serious discussion of Humanae Vitae had led to "a debilitating malaise that has undermined the credibility of the magisterium in other areas."

== Bibliography ==
- How brave a new world: Dilemmas in bioethics (1980)
- Odozor, Paulinus. Richard A. McCormick and the Renewal of Moral Theology. University of Notre Dame Press, 1994
- The Critical Calling: Reflections on Moral Dilemmas since Vatican II. Washington, Georgetown University Press, 1989.
