= University of Manitoba Libraries =

Academic library system in Canada

- University Librarian: Lisa O'Hara
- Location: 156 Elizabeth Dafoe Library, Winnipeg MB

Collection
- Size: 2,125,839 physical items; 1,509,354 electronic books

Other information
- Website: umanitoba.ca/libraries/

The University of Manitoba Libraries (UML) is the academic library system for the University of Manitoba. UML is made up of over a dozen libraries across two campuses—the main campus (Fort Garry) and the urban, health sciences campus (Bannatyne)—as well as one virtual library, the Winnipeg Regional Health Authority Virtual Library. It is also a member of the U15 Group of Canadian Research Universities.

The largest library of the university is the Elizabeth Dafoe Library.

UML is located in Winnipeg, Manitoba, on Treaty 1 territory, the land of the Anishinaabeg, Cree, Anisininew, Dakota, and Dene Peoples, and on the homeland of the Métis Nation.

== History ==
In 1885, the University of Manitoba acquired nearly 5,000 books from Alexander Kennedy Isbister, who died in 1883, gifted his books to the university in his last will and testament. This body of records, along with approximately $600 of scientific books, made up the bulk of the university's library. At the time, the University of Manitoba rented space to house the books in the McIntyre Block in Winnipeg's Exchange District, as the university did not have a library to house the books, or a librarian to look after them. Unfortunately, in 1898, the entirety of the library was lost in a fire that destroyed the McIntyre Block.

In 1904, the first official library was established at the University of Manitoba in the Faculty of Science. During this time, the Faculty of Science's Professor Frank Allen was appointed the honorary librarian and a new collection of books was accumulated through various sources, including the Royal Society of London, the British and Canadian governments, the Smithsonian Institution, as well as through internal sources, including professors and university associations (like the University of Manitoba Menorah Society). Shortly after, Professor Allen hired an assistance, Florence Davy Thompson was appointed, and an annual sum of money was set aside by the University Council for books and journals. In 1907, Thompson became the first librarian of the university.

In 1915, following Thompson's death, Alexandra Law took over the position for a six-month period. Following her term, Mr. Lowe, of the Botany Department, took over the position in the interim, until Franke E. Nuttal was hired in the fall of 1916. At this time, the library held approximately 16,000 volumes, spread across multiple offices and departments.

St. Paul's College affiliated with the University of Manitoba in 1931, and four years later, the St. Paul's College Free Lending and Reading Library officially began as an aid to the students of the college.

In 1935, towards the end of Nuttal's role as University Librarian, a Carnegie Corporation grant allowed for the creation of a junior library in the university's administration building. At that time, the university had two campuses—Fort Garry and Broadway—and its library holdings were spread out across multiple buildings at either campus.

In 1937, Julie Annette Elizabeth Dafoe (daughter of John W. Dafoe) became Head Librarian of the University of Manitoba, holding the position until 1960.

In 1940, the founder of St. Paul's College, Most Reverend Archbishop Sinnott, officiated the formal opening of the library to the public. (The library at this point contained 2000 holdings.) By 1946, the college formally established its own Library Guild, the principle mandate of which was to raise funds for more acquisitions and to increase the number of library patrons.

In the early 1950s, these libraries were collectively staffed by 22 people and held approximately 150,000 volumes and acquired on average 6,000 volumes per year. Study spaces were increasingly difficult to find, particularly during exam time when "standing room only was the rule in the libraries." To support the growing needs of the university, and in celebration of the university's 75th anniversary in 1952, a new central library on the Fort Garry campus was constructed. Dafoe, still the head librarian at this time, helped plan for the development of the new library, which would open in 1953 baring her name: Elizabeth Dafoe Library. The library acquired its 1-millionth volume in 1976; and in 1997, it would acquire its 2-millionth book: Voyages and Travels of an Indian Interpreter and Trader, authored by John Long.

In 1958, with its 20,000 books, St. Paul's College moved to the University of Manitoba campus. The following year, Father Harold Drake became head librarian, holding the position until 1992, when he retired. A year later, in 1993, the library was named in his honour and remains the current name of the St. Paul's library.

== Libraries ==
Today, the University of Manitoba Libraries include over a dozen libraries serving its various faculties and departments.

Library	Building	Faculties/colleges served	Collections	Notes
Fort Garry campus
Albert D. Cohen Management Library	Drake Centre	Asper School of Business		Named after Albert D. Cohen
Architecture/Fine Arts Library	John A. Russell Building	Faculty of Architecture and School of Art		Houses the largest collection of information on art, design, and planning in the province of Manitoba
Archives & Special Collections	3rd floor, Elizabeth Dafoe Library			Established in 1978, the Archives purpose to acquire, catalogue, and preserve university records and special research collections that further the educational aims of the university.
Donald W. Craik Engineering Library	Engineering Building	Faculty of Engineering		Named after Donald Craik
E. K. Williams Law Library	Robson Hall	Faculty of Law		
Eckhardt-Gramatté Music Library	Taché Arts Complex	Faculty of Music		Named after Eckhardt-Gramatté
Elizabeth Dafoe Library		Faculties of Arts, Education, Kinesiology & Recreation Management, Social Work, and of Graduate Studies; College of Nursing; and University 1	Government Publications	University of Manitoba's largest library, named after Julie Annette Elizabeth Dafoe.
Fr. Harold Drake Library	St. Paul's College	St. Paul's College	Catholic studies, Medieval studies, Philosophy (including Bernard Lonergan), Peace and conflict studies, History (European, British, Canadian), French literature (20th century), and English literature	The library holds over 70,000 volumes.
Sciences and Technology Library	Machray Hall	Faculties of Science; Engineering; Agricultural & Food Sciences; of Environment, Earth, & Resources		
St. John's College Library	St. John's College	St. John's College	History, Anglicanism, Biblical Studies, and French-Canadian & English Literature.	The library collection contains various items of historical interest, covering
William R. Newman Library		Faculty of Agriculture		The library was dedicated in 1998
Bannatyne campus
MHIKNET	Neil John Maclean Health Sciences Library	Rady Faculty of Health Sciences		MHIKNET (Manitoba's Health Information and Knowledge Network) is a service provided by the university's Health Sciences Libraries to staff of Manitoba Health, Seniors & Active Living, staff of participating Regional Health Authorities, and fee-for-service physicians in Manitoba.
Neil John Maclean Health Sciences Library	Brodie Centre	Rady Faculty of Health Sciences		Opened in June 1996 by incorporating the resources of the former Medical Library, the Neilson Dental Library, and the Health Sciences Centre Library Services.
WRHA Virtual Library	Virtual	Rady Faculty of Health Sciences		

== Services ==
UML supports research across the university by providing various services, including access to reference services, service desks, self-serve kiosks, media spaces, individual or group study spaces, and workshops. The Libraries further provide access to books, journals, articles, newspapers, government publications, online databases, e-journals, theses and dissertations, etc. University students, staff, and alumni have access to the Libraries services. Members of the general public can obtain borrowing privileges by purchasing a citizen borrower's card.

Services include:

- Data Management — UML assists researchers in organizing their data and ensuring it remains accessible over time by providing data management consultations.
- Digitization — Scanners throughout the Libraries can be used free of charge by students and staff for self-serve digitization. The Libraries' Research Services and Digital Strategies unit also offers fee-based digitization services for students, staff, and the general public.
- MSpace — MSpace is an institutional repository which stores faculty and student publications, including theses, dissertations, working papers, reports, etc.
- Subject Help — UML subject guides provide useful resources related to specific subjects, fields and disciplines, including related sources, databases, and research tips. Subject guides further provide students with the opportunity to contact and/or meet with specific Librarians specializing in those subjects.
- Workshops — UML offers GradSteps workshops to assist graduate students in various ways. Workshops cover topics such as data collection and analysis, communication skills, grant writing, financial planning, networking, research ethics, citing, reference management, using library resources, GIS and data visualization.

== Collections ==
Library	Collections	Description
Architecture/Fine Arts Library	Architectural Drawings and Building Plans	
Architecture/Fine Arts Library	Artist & Architect Files	Newspaper clippings, pamphlets, and other ephemera for artists, architects, and galleries in Manitoba
Architecture/Fine Arts Library	Building Files	Clippings and ephemera for local buildings of interest
Architecture/Fine Arts Library	Public Art at the UofM	Clippings and ephemera about public art on campus
Archives & Special Collections	Archives mandate	U of M records, Canadian Prairie Literary Manuscripts, the Archives of the Agricultural Experience, and rare books in the areas of western Canadiana, early Arctic exploration, early Native language syllabics, spiritualism, church history and philosophy, and agriculture, among others.
Archives & Special Collections	Archives of the Ukrainian Canadian Experience	Includes Ukrainian-Canadian community's records
Archives & Special Collections	Dysart Memorial Collection of Rare Books	In 1953, to mark the official opening of the Elizabeth Dafoe Library, a collection of 69 rare books were gifted to UML in honour of the late Justice Andrew Knox Dysart, who was the university's 4th Chancellor. The books were accumulated by university president A.H.S. Gillson and paid for through the Manitoba Brewers' and Hotelmen's Welfare Fund. The books were printed over numerous centuries, with some dating back to the 1400s.
Archives & Special Collections	Icelandic Collection	This collection (3rd floor Dafoe) holds over 27,000 volumes related to Icelandic literature, history, culture, and language. It is the largest body of Icelandic materials in Canada, as well as the second largest collection in North America.
Elizabeth Dafoe Library	Education Collection	The major portion of these collections is located on the second floor, which include: Instructional Materials; Canadian Children's Book Centre Collection; Young Adult Literature; Curriculum Documents; and Multimedia Collections
Elizabeth Dafoe Library	Government Publications	Includes documents and publications from the Governments of Canada, Manitoba, other provinces, the United States, the European Union, and other countries; and international governmental organizations such as the United Nations, OECD, World Bank, and International Labour Office.
Elizabeth Dafoe Library	Microfilm & Microfiche	The library has a large microform collection including microfilm, microfiche, and microcards that contain back issues of various newspapers, journals, theses, large research collections, and personal papers.
Elizabeth Dafoe Library	Slavic Collection (3rd floor)	This is a separate language collection of over 56,000 volumes of books, periodicals, newspapers, and microforms, among others. The Collection contains material mainly in humanities and social sciences, and most material is in Russian, Ukrainian, and Polish, although all 14 slavic languages are represented. This Collection supports courses and research in the Department of German & Slavic Studies, Department of Central and East European Studies, the Centre for Ukrainian Canadian Studies, and others.
Fr. Harold Drake Library	Canadian studies, Catholic studies, Medieval studies, Philosophy (including Bernard Lonergan), Peace and conflict studies, Political studies, History (European, British, Canadian), French literature (20th century), and English literature	
MHIKNET		
Neil John Maclean Health Sciences Library	College of Medicine Archives	
Neil John Maclean Health Sciences Library	Indigenous Health Collection	This collection is the only Indigenous health collection held by a Canadian academic health sciences library.
Neil John Maclean Health Sciences Library	The Manitoba Authors Collection	This Collection, which began in 1968, houses published materials authored by past and present faculty and students at the UM Faculty of Medicine. The Collection has grown to over 600 publications, and represents nearly every field in medicine, including pioneering works in pathology, geriatric medicine, haematology, microbiology; and covers such topics as public health, wartime medicine, responses to local epidemics, and Manitoba medical history.
Neil John Maclean Health Sciences Library	Relax 'n Read: Leisure Reading Collection	
Neil John Maclean Health Sciences Library	Ross Mitchell Rare Book Room	
St. John's College Library	Canadian studies	
St. John's College Library	Religious studies (Anglicanism, Biblical Studies)	
St. John's College Library	English studies	
St. John's College Library	French, Spanish, and Italian	
St. John's College Library	Native Studies: Indigenous Peoples of Canada	
St. John's College Library	The Mazinbiige Indigenous Graphic Novel Collection	This collection, launched on 13 November 2013, provides an unconventional approach to Indigenous stories.
WRHA Virtual Library		

=== UM Digital Collections ===
In 2013, the University of Manitoba Libraries launched their UM Digital Collections website. The digital asset management system provides access to over 75,000 rare books, newspapers, photographs, audio-visual content, and other textual records. The platform allows users to browse and search content, and download content in multiple access and preservation formats. Digital collections include a full run of the Winnipeg Tribune Newspaper, the University of Manitoba Brown and Gold Year Books, séance photos by Thomas Glendenning Hamilton, and the records of the Manitoba Gay & Lesbian Archives.
