= Arthur Mauro =

Canadian lawyer and businessman (1927–2023)

Arthur Valentine Mauro OC OM KC

11th Chancellor of University of Manitoba
- In office 1991–2000
- Preceded by: Henry Duckworth
- Succeeded by: Bill Norrie

7th Chancellor of Lakehead University
- In office January 1, 2010 – 2013
- Preceded by: Lorne Everett
- Succeeded by: Derek Burney

4th president and chief executive officer of Investors Group
- In office 1981–1992
- Preceded by: Robert H. Jones
- Succeeded by: H. Sanford Riley

Personal details
- Born: February 15, 1927 Thunder Bay, Ontario, Canada
- Died: August 4, 2023 (aged 96)
- Education: University of Manitoba
- Profession: Lawyer

Arthur Valentine Mauro, OC OM KC (February 15, 1927 – August 4, 2023) was a Canadian lawyer and businessman.

Born in Thunder Bay, Ontario, he studied law at the University of Manitoba and was president of the University of Manitoba Students' Union. He was called to the Bar of Manitoba in 1953. Until 1969 he practiced law, specializing in transportation and communication law. In 1967, he was appointed chairman of the Royal Commission on Northern Transportation.

In 1969, he became a senior executive with Great Northern Capital Corporation. From 1972 to 1976, he was president and chief executive officer of Transair Limited. In 1976, he joined the Investors Group, becoming president, chief executive officer and chairman.

In 1991, he was elected chancellor of the University of Manitoba, serving until 2000. From 2009 through 2012, he served as chancellor of Lakehead University.

Arthur Mauro died on August 4, 2023, at the age of 96.

== Honours ==
In 1987, he was made a member of the Order of Canada and was promoted to officer in 1992. In 2004, he was awarded the Order of Manitoba.
