= UMSU =

UMSU may stand for:

- University of Manchester Students' Union
- University of Manitoba Students' Union
- University of Melbourne Student Union
- Universitas Muhammadiyah Sumatera Utara, a university in Indonesia
