= Witchpolice =

Music podcast

Presentation
- Hosted by: Sam Thompson
- Genre: Music podcast
- Format: Audio
- Language: English

Production
- Audio format: MP3

Related
- Website: witchpolice.com

Witchpolice is a music archive and weekly musician interview podcast first established in 2009. Beginning as a blog dedicated to archiving the music history of Winnipeg, it evolved into a podcast that is also broadcast on Sunday nights at midnight on 101.5 UMFM.

It is currently hosted by Winnipeg journalist Sam Thompson, as well as a rotating team that occasionally organise the program, including Jon Askholm, Rob Crooks, Elliott Walsh, Ryan Sanders and Dwayne Larson. The hosts discuss a wide range of music, commonly that of the local guest they feature in every installment. They often discuss the guest's work and allow them to showcase their latest projects as live performances.

On their 100th episode, they featured Chris Hannah, the lead singer from Propagandhi. The episode was significant for Thompson as he said Propagandhi was an influential band that constantly came up when interviewing other local artists.

The podcast has also featured such notable Manitoba artists as Pip Skid, Del Barber, Duotang, Fred Penner, iskwē, Royal Canoe, Ridley Bent, Romi Mayes, Leonard Sumner, Kelly Fraser, and hundreds of smaller, independent musicians.

It has also occasionally featured musicians from other parts of Canada and overseas who are visiting Winnipeg on tour, including Ziggy Marley, Luciano, The Slackers, Julie and the Wrong Guys, and more.

In 2015, at the local Winnipeg bar The Handsome Daughter, after three years and 150 episodes, Witchpolice held its first live podcast in front of an audience.

Subsequent live events were held in the ensuing years at the same venue as well as at Winnipeg's historic Park Theatre and Torque Brewing

In 2019, it was nominated for a Canadian Podcast Award

== History ==
Witchpolice was created by Thompson and Crooks in 2009 as an archive of local Winnipeg music, originally to showcase their own work in the experimental electronic duo Dynamo, which had released a single entitled "We Are The Witch Police" that year.

Together with third host Askholm, Thompson and Crooks converted the Witchpolice archive to a podcast in 2012.

Thompson, together with Askholm and drummer Goldwyn Millar, were members of The Mouth-Boat, an experimental punk-rock trio that interpolated elements of jazz into their records. The band released Everybody Shimmy in 2007, My Teddy in 2009, and reunited in 2012 to release Spiritualism.

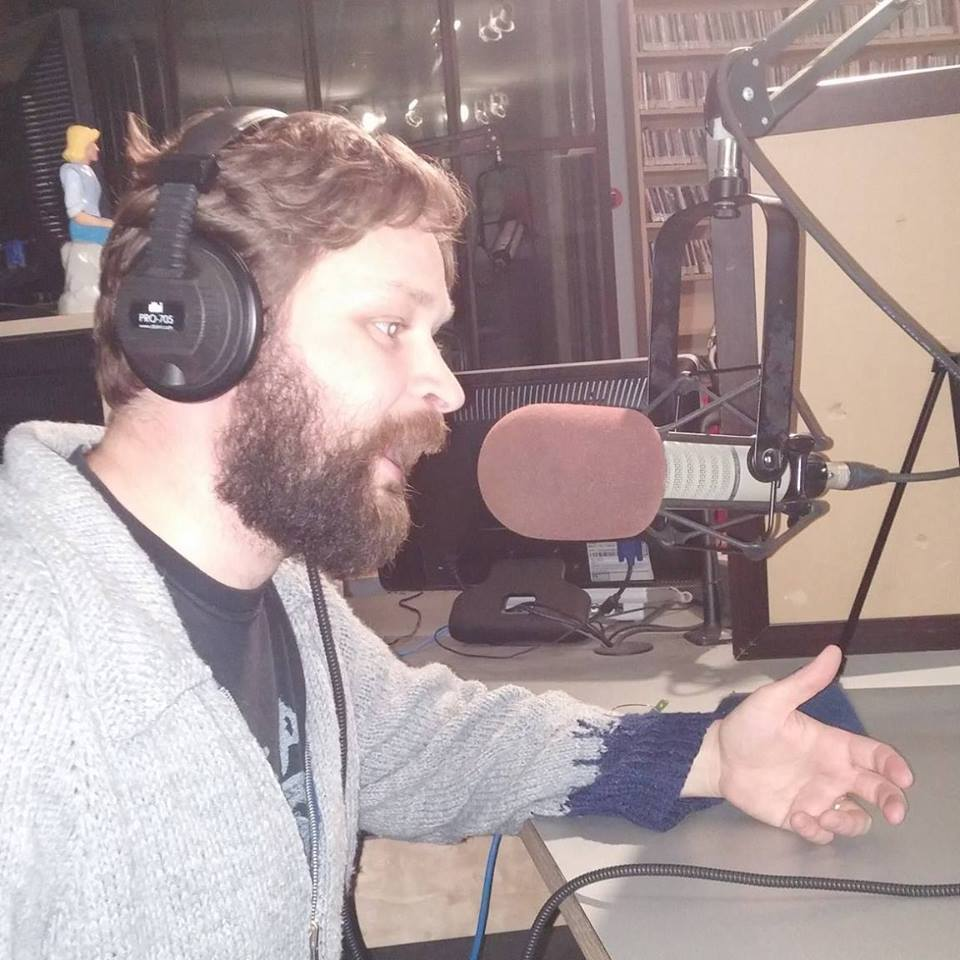
Witchpolice host Thompson on-air at UMFM 101.5 in Winnipeg, Manitoba.

=== Development and release ===
The first podcast, entitled "First Show", and posted to their Blogger page in November 2012, ran for two hours and seventeen minutes and was referred to as "a raw, unpolished debut", wherein Thompson, Crooks and Askholm played and reviewed the 2012 Mouth-Boat album, Spiritualism. There was also discussion about records by artists including Propagandhi, Public Image Limited, The Mars Volta, Rational Youth, and others.

For the rest of 2012, the podcast's format, discussing music based on pre-determined themes.

It was in January 2013 that Witchpolice hosted its first guest, Dave Halcrow, a bassist from the bands Brat Attack and Talk City. The format of the show remained unchanged, although the running time was reduced to an hour after the first episode.

In October 2015, the podcast was recorded live at Winnipeg bar The Handsome Daughter. The episode, entitled "Live and Direct", featured Thompson and Sanders, along with regular collaborators Nestor Wynrush, Country Steve, and poet Mona Mousa. Crooks was also invited as a guest. It featured interviews and live performances from those invited to celebrate the podcast's "milestone 150th" instalment.

Following the live show, the format shifted again and Thompson began recording the majority of episodes with a focus solely on the guest's own music each week.

In 2016, a second live episode was hosted, focused on concert photography. The episode was entitled "Shoot First, Ask Questions Later" and featured a number of prominent Winnipeg photographers.

== Awards and reaction ==
Witchpolice Radio has received several accolades over the course of recording their show, including being named Favourite Local Radio Show or Podcast for three consecutive years – 2016, 2017, and 2018 by readers of University of Winnipeg's campus/community weekly, The Uniter.

Host Thompson, for his work on the show, was also selected as one of Manitoba's 100 Most Fascinating People by Virgin Radio Winnipeg personality Ace Burpee in 2017.

In 2019, the show was nominated for a Canadian Podcast Award for Outstanding Music Series.

Within Winnipeg, Witchpolice has been featured by several media publications, who have noted its promotion of local music.

The program has been noted for promoting band up-and-coming or underrated artists more frequently than high-profile performers.

== See also ==
- Music podcast
