= CJUM-FM =

Radio station at the University of Manitoba in Winnipeg

- Winnipeg, Manitoba; Canada
- Broadcast area: Winnipeg Metropolitan Region
- Frequency: 101.5 MHz
- Branding: UMFM

Programming
- Format: freeform/spoken word/campus radio
- Affiliations: Pacifica Radio Network

Ownership
- Owner: UMFM Campus Radio Inc.

History
- Founded: October 27, 1975, with the original CJUM
- First air date: September 4, 1998
- Call sign meaning: University of Manitoba

Technical information
- Class: A
- ERP: 1,200 watts
- HAAT: 133 metres (436 ft)
- Transmitter coordinates: 49°53′43.1″N 97°08′17.2″W

Links
- Website: umfm.com

CJUM-FM (101.5 FM, UMFM) is a volunteer-driven campus radio station in Winnipeg, Manitoba, Canada, based at the University of Manitoba and transmits with 1,200 watts from an antenna located at Portage and Main in downtown Winnipeg.

== History ==
=== The original CJUM, 1975–80 ===
The station originally began broadcasting at 101.1 FM 6 a.m, October 27, 1975. CJUM-FM was one of the two first campus radio stations ever granted a broadcast licence in Canada, the other being Carleton University's CKCU-FM. However, the station faced financial difficulties, and closed down in June 1980. The original station signed off the air with Bruce Springsteen's "Born to Run". One reason the station closed down was due to the high cost of a BBM subscription.

Many of the staff and volunteers at CJUM-FM during this early period went on to careers in commercial and public broadcasting, including Steve Baidwan, Shelia Baptie, Rick Carter, Liz Clayton, Reid Dickie, Andy Frost, Marty Gold (Goldstein), Dale MacIntyre, Hugh Malcolmson, Howard Mandshein, Roman Onafrychuk, John Quinn, Chris Reichardt, Ron Robinson, and Les Siemieniuk. At the time, CJUM-FM was renowned also for programming produced and hosted by local jazz aficionados—including its two hours of "Morning Jazz" every Monday through Friday—featuring the selections of such knowledgeable hosts as Raymond Alexander, Maury "Morris Timespace" Bay, Danny Carroll, Neal Kimelman, Bill Mudge and Kristen Templin, establishing the campus & community station as the "go-to" spot on the dial for Winnipeggers seeking jazz programs on radio.

Besides successful morning jazz programming, CJUM-FM hosted what was probably the most popular all-night radio show in Winnipeg, Morris Bay's "Time Space and Dream Machine" which offered an eclectic mix of underground and fusion music, as well as pop and rock, often featuring Canadian indie bands. Every night, every cab driver and railway worker in Winnipeg was tuned to this show. On the other side of the spectrum CJUM-FM broadcast a successful classical music show called "Polifonie" hosted by Canadian composer Peter Allen, who at that time was a student in the School of Music at the U of M. "Polifonie" included the traditional classical repertoire, often featuring various local artists recorded by Peter Allen in live concert situations, as well as progressive avante garde and experimental music from internationally acclaimed 20th century composers.

=== The revitalized CJUM, 1998–present ===
In the spring of 1996, a group of University of Manitoba students started a campaign to bring radio back to the campus. During a referendum that year, a $5 increase in student fees was sought, and passed with 2,520 votes for the levy, to go towards the construction and maintenance of this new station. The University of Manitoba Students' Union put forth an application to the Canadian Radio-television and Telecommunications Commission (CRTC) for a broadcasting licence, broadcasting at 101.5 MHz with effective radiated power of 1,200 watts was officially approved on October 2, 1997, and the station was reincarnated and began broadcasting on September 4, 1998 at 6:00 PM Central Daylight Time.
