= Henry Duckworth =

Canadian physicist and university administrator

2nd President of the University of Winnipeg
- In office 1971–1981
- Preceded by: Wilfred Lockhart
- Succeeded by: Robin Farquhar

Personal details
- Born: November 1, 1915 Brandon Manitoba
- Died: December 18, 2008 (aged 93) Winnipeg Manitoba
- Occupation: physicist and university administrator
- Awards: Henry Marshall Tory Medal 1965

Henry Edmison Duckworth, OC FRSC (November 1, 1915 – December 18, 2008) was a Canadian physicist and university administrator. He was the second president of the University of Winnipeg.

The Duckworth Centre at the University of Winnipeg is named in his honour.

== Biography ==
Born in Brandon, Manitoba, and raised in Winnipeg, Duckworth received a Bachelor of Arts degree from Wesley College in 1935, followed by a Bachelor of Science degree in 1936 and a teaching certificate in 1937 from the University of Manitoba. From 1938 to 1940, he taught math and physics at secondary and junior colleges in Manitoba. In 1940, he continued his education, receiving a Ph.D. in Physics from the University of Chicago in 1942.

During World War II, he was a junior scientist with the Royal Canadian Corps of Signals assigned to the National Research Council of Canada. After the war, he an Assistant Professor of Physics at the University of Manitoba from 1945 to 1946. He then was a Professor of Physics at Wesleyan University from 1946 to 1951. From 1951 to 1965, he was a Professor of Physics at McMaster University. From 1961 to 1965, he was the Dean of Graduate Studies at McMaster University. Among his academic works is Mass Spectroscopy, the first definitive English-language book on the subject.

In 1965, he was appointed Vice-President (Academic) at the University of Manitoba. From 1971 to 1981, he was the second president of the University of Winnipeg. From 1986 to 1992, he was the tenth chancellor of the University of Manitoba.

From 1971 to 1972, he was the president of the Royal Society of Canada. In 2000, he released his memoirs One Version of the Facts: My Life in the Ivory Tower (ISBN 0887556701).

In 1976, he was made an Officer of the Order of Canada for "his contributions to physics at university education and his service on numerous scientific and educational bodies".

On December 18, 2008, he died after having suffered a series of strokes that started shortly after his birthday.

== Legacy ==
The Duckworth Centre at the University of Winnipeg is named in Henry Duckworth's honour. Duckworth was posthumously made Professor Emeritus of the university in 2013.

Duckworth’s name and support also belongs to several annual student scholarships at the University of Winnipeg.

Professional and academic associations
Preceded by Roy Daniells	President of the Royal Society of Canada; 1971–1972	Succeeded by John Tuzo Wilson
Academic offices
Preceded by Wilfred Lockhart	President of the University of Winnipeg; 1971–1981	Succeeded by Robin Farquhar
Preceded by Isabel G. Auld	Chancellor of the University of Manitoba; 1986–1992	Succeeded by Arthur Mauro
