= University of Manitoba Archives & Special Collections =

Coordinates: 49.8078°N 97.1392°W

The University of Manitoba Archives & Special Collections is a department of the University of Manitoba Libraries which holds historical records related to and created by the University of Manitoba. It is also a collector of private records of individuals, families, organizations and businesses. It is located in Winnipeg, Manitoba.

== Mandate and history ==
Since its establishment in 1978, the Archives' mission has been to acquire, catalogue, preserve and make available university records and special research collections in order to further the educational aims of the University of Manitoba. Private records include: Canadian literature, the Archives of the Agricultural Experience, the Archives of the Ukrainian Canadian Experience, the Winnipeg Tribune, Native Studies and psychical research (including the Hamilton Family fonds) among others. The Archives also collects rare books in subject areas including western Canadiana, early Arctic exploration, early Native language syllabics, spiritualism, church history and philosophy, and agriculture.

Only two archivists have served as Head since the official establishment of the archives: Dr. Richard Bennett (1978-1997) and Dr. Shelley Sweeney (1998 on). Michael Moosberger served as Acting Head for 1997-98.

== Facilities ==
On April 28, 2008, on the 30th anniversary of the establishment of the Archives, the repository held a grand reopening, featuring completely renovated facilities with an additional reference room capable of holding 220 persons, a classroom for 30, a meeting room, six offices, a media viewing room, and an updated rare book room with its own temperature and humidity controls and exhibition areas. The Archives stores the majority of its records in the Annex, a facility that houses both records and books, which was built in 2008 onto the Elizabeth Dafoe Library where the Archives is located.

== Outreach ==
Historically, Dr. Bennett created a number of unique initiatives to reach out to users, including the First Annual Archives Symposium in 1979 where donors and others spoke about the papers of such writers as Nan Shipley and Frederick Philip Grove, and the Discovery Hour Series (1982-1986), which saw a number of notable people speak on a variety of topics. Some of these talks were also associated with the donation of materials to Archives & Special Collections. The collection relating to the Series includes talks by poets Eli Mandel and John Newlove, and freelance writer Heather Robertson. In 1994, the annual J.B. Rudnyckyj Distinguished Lecture Series was established and is jointly presented by Archives & Special Collections, the Slavic Collections of the Elizabeth Dafoe Library, and the Department of German & Slavic Studies to bring in lively speakers on some topic of Slavic studies. From 1988 to 1995, the Archives co-sponsored the Manitoba History Conferences.

Today an occasional lecture on the subject of psychical research or the paranormal has been added. The Archives also maintains a website on the history of the University of Manitoba and helps run yearly tours of historic buildings on campus. A historic plaque program has seen the addition of informational plaques inside most buildings on both the Fort Garry and Bannatyne campuses as well as an accompanying walking tour. The Archives provides a number of grants to assist researchers to travel to Winnipeg or to employ its archival records.

In an effort to reach more users, the Archives published a guide to its holdings in 1993: A Guide to the Major Holdings of the Department of Archives and Special Collections, the University of Manitoba Libraries. More recently, the Archives has been digitizing selections from its most popular collections to make them more broadly available to the public. Many thousands of images from dozens of collections have been scanned to date. A channel on YouTube, UMA-TV, has been established to provide easier access to moving image collections. Historic maps from the Archives have been uploaded onto Flickr.

== Archives in popular culture ==
Although many hundreds of collections held by the Archives have been used by researchers in the production of publications, films, exhibitions and so on, the Archives itself has been featured in many books, including: J.M. Bumsted's The University of Manitoba: An Illustrated History (2001); Russ Gourluck's Picturing Manitoba: Legacies of the Winnipeg Tribune (2008); and Christina Penner's Widows of Hamilton House (2008).
