= Isabel Auld =

Isabel George Auld CM (née Hutcheson 21 September 1917 – 27 March 2016) was the chancellor of the University of Manitoba from 1977 to 1986. Before becoming the first woman to hold this position, Auld primarily worked as a volunteer from the 1940s to 1960s. During this time period, she co-founded the Consumers' Association of Canada in 1953 and became the association's president in 1964. Leading up to 1977, Auld was part of the board of directors for the University of Manitoba. Following her career, Auld became a Member of the Order of Canada in 1989. She also received the Queen Elizabeth II Golden Jubilee Medal in 2002 and the Queen Elizabeth II Diamond Jubilee Medal in 2012.

== Early life and education ==
Isabel Hutcheson was born in Winnipeg, Manitoba on 21 September 1917. After moving to Regina, Saskatchewan during her youth, she went to the University of Saskatchewan for her post-secondary education. While specializing in biology and genetics, Hutcheson earned both her Bachelor and Master of Science at Saskatchewan by 1940. She also went to McGill University and studied cytology for her postgraduate education. She received an honorary Doctor of Laws by both the University of Saskatchewan in 1979 and the University of Manitoba in 1986.

== Career ==
As part of the University of Manitoba, Hutcheson briefly worked in cytogenetics for the Rust Research Laboratory during the early 1940s. After marrying in 1942, Isabel Auld ended her scientific career and began working as a volunteer. In 1953, she co-founded the Consumers' Association of Canada. She became the CAC's president in 1964. Auld began her executive career with the University of Manitoba in 1968 as part of itss board of directors.

After leaving the board of directors in 1972, Auld worked in the admissions committee of the dentistry department for Manitoba until 1975. In 1977, she became the first woman to hold the chancellor position in the university's first century. In addition, Auld was part of their academic senate and presented academic degrees during graduation. She remained as Manitoba's chancellor until Henry E. Duckworth took over the position in 1986. In 2004, Auld kept her chancellor position with the University of Manitoba as an emeritus title.

== Awards and honours ==
Auld became a Member of the Order of Canada in 1989. She was presented with the Queen Elizabeth II Golden Jubilee Medal in 2002, and the Queen Elizabeth II Diamond Jubilee Medal in 2012. In 2021, Auld was selected as one of the Manitoba 150 Women Trailblazers recipients by the Nellie McClung Foundation. The Winnipeg Regional Real Estate Board named Auld as part of the Citizens Hall of Fame in 1993.

== Death ==
Auld died in Winnipeg on 27 March 2016.
