= St. Paul's College, Manitoba =

Catholic college in Manitoba, Canada

St. Paul's College
- Established: 1926; 100 years ago
- Religious affiliation: Roman Catholic and Jesuit
- Rector: Christopher Adams
- Students: Approx. 1300
- Location: 70 Dysart Road, Winnipeg, Manitoba, R3T 2M6, Canada; 49°48′37.5″N 97°08′17″W
- Mascot: Pauley the Belltower
- Website: umanitoba.ca/stpauls
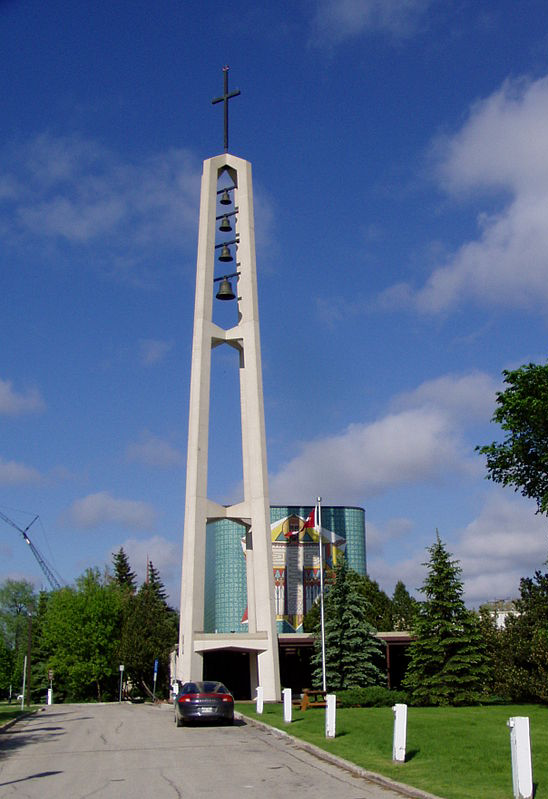
- Bell tower & entrance

St. Paul's College is a Catholic college on the Fort Garry campus of the University of Manitoba in Winnipeg, Manitoba, Canada. It was founded in 1926 by the Missionary Oblates of Mary Immaculate and became affiliated with the University of Manitoba in 1931.

St. Paul's is the only Catholic higher education institute in the local OMI province and enrolls approximately 850 undergraduate students.

== History ==
St. Paul's College was established in 1926 with Fr. Alphonse Simon, OMI as the first rector. It was initially located in a building on Selkirk Avenue, but the increase in student population thereafter prompted a move to the old Manitoba College location, which was purchased by Archbishop Sinnott in 1931. The direction of the college passed into the hands of the diocesan clergy and Fr. C. B. Collins was appointed Rector. In the same year, the college became affiliated with the University of Manitoba.

On October 27, 1931, at the time of its affiliation, St. Paul's had a staff of 15 (eight priests and seven laymen), and a total of twelve students in the university program. The University of Manitoba Yearbook for 1932, The Brown and Gold, displays the photographs of the first two graduates of the college.

Jesuit priests undertook direction of the college in 1933. Fr. John Holland, S.J., was appointed Rector, and Fr. Erle Bartlett, S.J. was appointed Dean of Studies. In 1936, St. Mary's College for Women became the women's division of St. Paul's, until the college opened on the Fort Garry campus in 1957 when it became co-educational and St. Mary's eventually withdrew from university work.

Campus construction was largely funded by individual donors and churches of Manitoba. In 1932, a new campus building, Paul Shea Hall (donated by Margaret Shea), was built to house the high school. In 1939, six more classrooms were added and paid for through the Archdiocese. By the mid-1940s, students were being turned away because of the lack of space. A building fund drive at that time was not particularly successful and attention was turned again to relocating on the University of Manitoba campus with whom ongoing negotiations about relocation had been taking place. In 1957 a 99-year lease for land on the campus was signed and a cornerstone was laid and blessed by Archbishop Pocock. The Canada council contributed $100,000 towards the construction costs. The architect was Mr. Peter Thornton; the contractors were Wallace and Aikens.

In the fall of 1958, the basic buildings and administrative offices containing classrooms, library, cafeteria, faculty offices, and the chapel were completed. About 200 students registered that year.

In 1962 the Science Wing was added, containing laboratories, an increased number of classrooms, and faculty offices. The student cafeteria was extended in 1964 and the residence of the Jesuit Fathers was added. The library, along with a theatre with a capacity of 200, more classroom and faculty office space were constructed in 1972. A larger library and a student residence were part of the original plan, but were never constructed.

The college has since come under the direction of the St. Paul's Corporation and an 18-person Board of Governors. The Archbishop of Winnipeg is the College chancellor.

The new millennium saw the construction of the Arthur V. Mauro Centre for Peace and Justice - an addition that provides graduate and undergraduate studies in peace-building and conflict-resolution.

== Scholarships and bursaries ==
The Government of Canada sponsors an Aboriginal Bursaries Search Tool that lists over 680 scholarships, bursaries, and other incentives offered by governments, universities, and industry to support Aboriginal post-secondary participation. St. Paul's College scholarships for Aboriginal, First Nations and Métis students include: Sundance Aboriginal Student Award.

== Campus ==
=== Arthur V. Mauro Institute ===
The Arthur V. Mauro Institute (formerly the Arthur V. Mauro Centre) at St. Paul's College, University of Manitoba, is built to encourage the advancement of human rights, conflict resolution, global citizenship, peace, and social justice through research, education, and outreach.

The Mauro Institute's initial emphases has been the cultural, religious, and philosophical dimensions of peace; social, economic, and environmental justice; peace education; human rights; and the role of international organizations and standards in the quest for peace and justice. The institute is also interested in the role of the Abrahamic religions of Judaism, Christianity, and Islam in pointing ways for people to live in peace and harmony in a post-modern world.

The Joint M.A. Program in Peace and Conflict Studies (governed jointly by the University of Manitoba and the University of Winnipeg) is housed at the Mauro Centre (U of M) and the Global College (U of W).

The institute is home to the University of Manitoba's Ph.D. Program in Peace and Conflict Studies.

Storytelling for Peace and Renewing Community (SPARC) is an initiative of the Institute that encompasses the Winnipeg International Storytelling Festival: Storytelling on the Path to Peace; the Youth Forum on Human Rights, Peace, and Social Justice; a 6-credit master's-level Summer Institute on Storytelling for Peace and Human Rights; and the Mauro Centre Storytelling Working Group.

=== Near Eastern and Biblical Archaeology Laboratory ===
The Near Eastern and Biblical Archaeology Laboratory (NEBAL) was established in 2010 by St. Paul's College at the University of Manitoba. The goal is to have a single integrated location for the study of the ancient cultures of the Near East and eastern Mediterranean. It provides a focus for seminars and lectures related to Near Eastern and Biblical Studies at the University of Manitoba. All related archaeological remains scattered throughout the university are being gathered in this location for analysis and curation. NEBAL also provides a single integrated research and administrative facility for faculty and students.

=== Fr. Harold Drake Library ===
The Fr. Harold Drake Library at St. Paul's College focuses on supporting the teaching and research needs of staff and students at St. Paul's College including the University One program, the Jesuit Centre for Catholic Studies and the Arthur V. Mauro Centre for Peace and Justice.

The Library holds over 70,000 volumes including the following collections:

- Catholic Studies: Theology and history of the Catholic Church, contemporary Catholic issues
- Medieval Studies
- Philosophy (including Bernard Lonergan)
- Peace and Conflict Studies
- History (European, British, Canadian)
- French literature (20th century) and English literature

The Fr. Harold Drake Library offers a full range of library services including access to the entire University of Manitoba Libraries collections, reference and reserve services, patron print, scanning and photocopying. The Library's collections and services are open to all University of Manitoba Libraries patrons.

== Catholic Studies Program ==
The historical relationships and ongoing encounters that the members of the Roman Catholic Church have had with disciplines such as history, the arts and sciences, as well as human thought comprise the framework around which the Catholic Studies program is formed.

The Catholic Studies program at St. Paul's College was designed as an interdisciplinary unit that fosters an intellectual and academic approach to Catholicism. It seeks to explore the Catholic tradition in ways that do justice to its full contributions and challenges as a historical and contemporary phenomenon. In order to provide crucial perspectives on the Catholic culture, the program itself includes the findings of many academic disciplines such as Religion, History, Fine Arts, and Philosophy.

The Catholic Studies Program's goal is to study, explore, and engage Catholicism in all its social, political, and religious complexities. The program is aimed at students who wish to pursue Catholic Studies as a minor as well as for those students who only want to take one or two courses that would expand and deepen their understanding of Catholicism.

== St. Paul's College Students' Association ==
The St. Paul's College Students' Association (SPCSA) consists of students pursuing any program of study at U of M, who are registered members of the college. SPCSA members are elected annually by students. Its purpose is to organize and promote events and special initiatives, and represent students' interests (academic, spiritual, and social).

Events are planned throughout the year such as a Welcome Back BBQ, Sibling Rivalry BBQ with St. John's College, Back to School Bash, Valentine's Day Bash, St. Patrick's Day Bash, and closing ceremonies.

== See also ==
- List of Jesuit sites
