= University of Manitoba =

Public university in Winnipeg, Canada

- Latin: Universitas Manitobanensis
- Motto: Floreat (Latin)
- Motto in English: "Flourish" (or "Prosper")
- Type: Public university
- Established: 1877; 149 years ago
- Academic affiliations: CVU; U15; Universities Canada
- Endowment: $878 million
- Chancellor: David Angus
- President: Michael Benarroch
- Academic staff: 5,252
- Administrative staff: 3,838
- Students: 30,370
- Undergraduates: 26,660
- Postgraduates: 3,710
- Location: Winnipeg, Manitoba, Canada
- Campus: Urban, 691 acres (280 ha), Fort Garry Campus
- Colours: Brown and gold
- Nickname: Bisons
- Sporting affiliations: U Sports – CWUAA
- Mascot: Billy the Bison
- Website: umanitoba.ca

The University of Manitoba (U of M, UManitoba, or UM) is a public research university in Winnipeg, Manitoba, Canada. Founded in 1877, it is the first university in Western Canada. Both by total student enrolment and campus area, the University of Manitoba is the largest university in the province of Manitoba. Its main campus is located in the Fort Garry neighbourhood of Winnipeg, with other campuses throughout the city: the Bannatyne Campus, the James W. Burns Executive Education Centre, the William Norrie Centre, and the French-language affiliate, Université de Saint-Boniface in the Saint Boniface ward.

Research at the university contributed to the creation of canola oil in the 1970s. Likewise, University of Manitoba alumni include Nobel Prize recipients, Academy Award winners, Order of Merit recipients, and Olympic medalists. As of 2019, there have been 99 Rhodes Scholarship recipients from the University of Manitoba, more than that of any other university in western Canada.

The University of Manitoba is a member of the U15 group of research-intensive universities in Canada and of Universities Canada, while its global affiliations include the International Association of Universities and the Association of Commonwealth Universities.

The Manitoba Bisons compete in U Sports and Canada West Universities Athletic Association (CWUAA).

== History ==
=== Founding ===
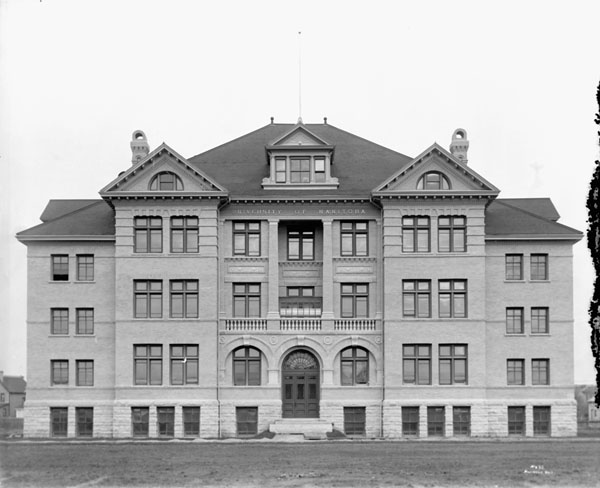
Photo of the university taken by William James Topley, c. 1877–1930

The University of Manitoba, founded by Alexander Morris, was established under the University of Manitoba Act as a "Provincial University" on 28 February 1877, becoming the first institution of higher education to be established in western Canada.

The first University of Manitoba Chancellor (1877–1904) was Robert Machray, later the Archbishop of Rupert's Land. The first vice-chancellor (1877–1889) was Manitoba Attorney-General Joseph Royal, who was also the one to introduce the bill for the University of Manitoba Act.

=== Founding colleges ===
Officially opening on June 20, 1877, the university was formed by the federation of three existing denominational colleges and conferred degrees on students graduating from these colleges: Collège de Saint-Boniface (Roman Catholic), St John's College (Anglican), and Manitoba College (Presbyterian).

The university would add a number of colleges to its corporate and associative body since. In 1882, the Manitoba Medical College, privately founded by physicians and surgeons, became a part of the university. Six years later, in 1888, Wesley College (Methodist) became affiliated with the university as well. The Bacteriological Research Building of the Manitoba Medical College would be designed by architect Charles Henry Wheeler in 1897, while the Science Building, between 1899 and 1900 by architect George Creeford Browne.

In 1895, the University of Manitoba Act was amended to give the denominational colleges the power to confer degrees in divinity. It would be amended again two years later in order to allow the Manitoba government to grant up to $60,000 for the university and a normal school (i.e., a teaching college).

In 1900, the university became a teaching institution by an act of the Legislative Assembly of Manitoba. Soon after, other colleges also received affiliated status:

- Manitoba College of Pharmacy (1902)
- Manitoba Agricultural College (1906)
- St. Paul's College (1931)
- Brandon College (1938)
- St. Andrew's College (1981), which was established in 1946 to train the ministry for the Ukrainian Greek Orthodox Church.

In 1938, Wesley College and Manitoba College merged to form United College. Three decades later, in 1967, United College became the University of Winnipeg, and Brandon College became Brandon University.

In contrast, Collège universitaire de St. Boniface has retained its affiliation with the University of Manitoba, though operating independently on its own campus in the St. Boniface area of Winnipeg. Moreover, St. John's, St. Paul's, and St. Andrew's College have continued their affiliated relationship with the University of Manitoba into the present day, and are housed on the university's Fort Garry campus.

=== Early development ===
The university would hold its first exams on 27 May 1878, taken by a total of seven students, all from Manitoba College. Two years later, the University of Manitoba conferred its first degree, the recipient being Reginald William Gunn, a Métis student of Manitoba College who graduated with honours in Natural Sciences.

In 1885, the university is approved by the federal government for up to 150,000 acres (610 km^{2}) of crown land in Manitoba as an endowment.

In 1886, the University of Manitoba admitted its first woman student, Jessie Holmes, and in 1889, Holmes also became the university's first female graduate. In 1892, the Manitoba Medical College saw its first female graduate, Hattie Foxton, who passed her exams with first-class standing for Doctor of Medicine and Master of Surgery.

In 1897, the University of Manitoba Act was amended in order to allow the Manitoba government to grant up to $60,000 for the university and a normal school (i.e., a teaching college).

In the early part of the 20th century, professional education expanded beyond the traditional fields of theology, law, and medicine. Graduate training based on the German-inspired American model of specialized course work and the completion of a research thesis was introduced.

As the university recognized its need to be a teaching university in addition to its degree-granting responsibilities, the science building was built in 1901 on Broadway in downtown Winnipeg, becoming the university's first teaching facility. The university's first dedicated staff was subsequently hired in 1904 to teach in the newly created Faculty of Science. This staff of science professors is regarded as the university's "original six," and included A.H.R. Buller (botany and geology), Frank Allen (physics and mineralogy), M.A. Parker (chemistry), R. R. Cochrane (mathematics), Swale Vincent (physiology), and Gordon Bell (bacteriology).

In 1908 the university established its library and Florence Davy Thompson became the first librarian.

The Broadway location—as well as the current site of the Canadian Mennonite University near Assiniboine Park—was considered as a possible main campus. However, the university ultimately decided on its current site at Fort Garry in order to be near the Manitoba Agricultural College, which, in 1911, began constructing the campus’ first buildings: Tache Hall, the Administration Building, and the Home Economics Building (now the Human Ecology Building), all completed in 1912.

Between 1911 and 1912, the university conferred its first honorary degrees, received by President of the University of Toronto Robert Alexander Falconer and by Lieutenant-Governor of Manitoba Daniel Hunter Macmillan. On 1 January 1913, James Alexander Maclean became the first President of the university. Also in 1913, the university officially moved to the site, where it began constructing some of its own buildings, including the Engineering building. That year, the Departments of Architecture, Mechanical Engineering, French, and of German were established as well.

=== World War I ===
Many of the university's students went off to fight in the First World War, for which the University of Manitoba also served as a training ground. Between 1914 and 1915, the University Council established a Committee on Military Instruction, authorizing the teaching of military science and tactics, and a university corps is also organized. In 1915, the Western Universities Battalion (the 196th) of the Canadian Expeditionary Forces (CEF) was formed. On the first of March that year, the appointment of the Canadian Officers' Training Corps of the university was published.

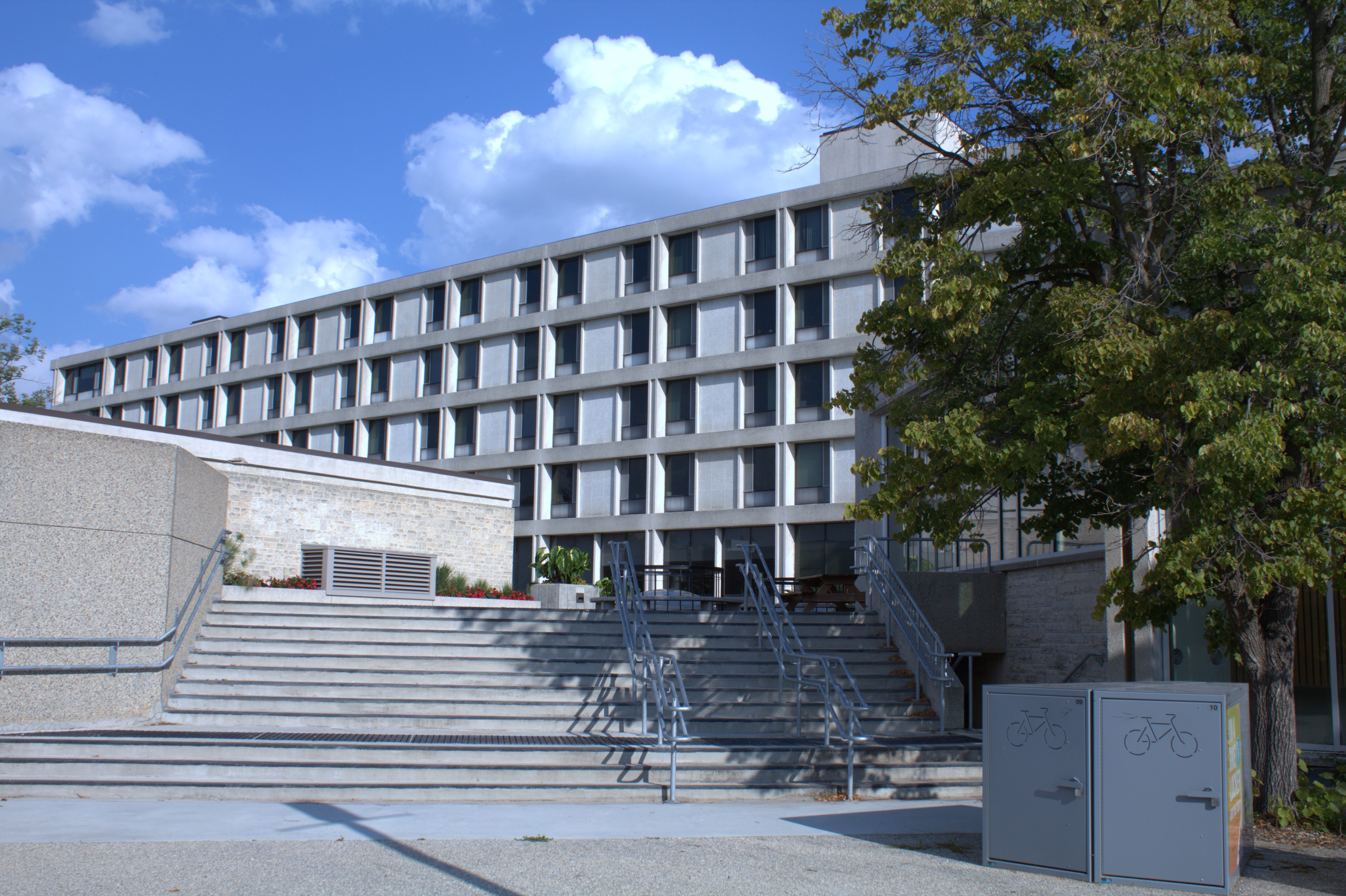
Fletcher Argue Building

In 1914, the Manitoba Law School was founded by the University of Manitoba and the Law Society of Manitoba as an affiliated college of the university. Officially opening on 3 October 1914, the School would have 123 students (including 5 women) and 21 academic staff in 1920. On 23 April 1915, a Baccalaureate Address was given at the end of the academic session for the first time in the university's history. In 1919, the University of Manitoba would found the first school of architecture in all of western Canada.

In 1916, the Departments of Arts (including Mathematics) and Architecture, the Library, and the administrative offices of the university were moved into the former Law Courts Building. Also that year, Englishman Frank E. Nuttall became the first trained librarian for the university.

In 1916, an Overseas Correspondence Club was established to write letters to UM students serving in England and France during the War, keeping them up-to-date in on University activities during their absence. At a March Faculty Council meeting in 1917, taking note of the Russian Revolution, the Faculty ordered the sending of a congratulatory telegram to the Provisional Government of Russia. The telegram was subsequently answered by Foreign Minister Pavel Milyukov.

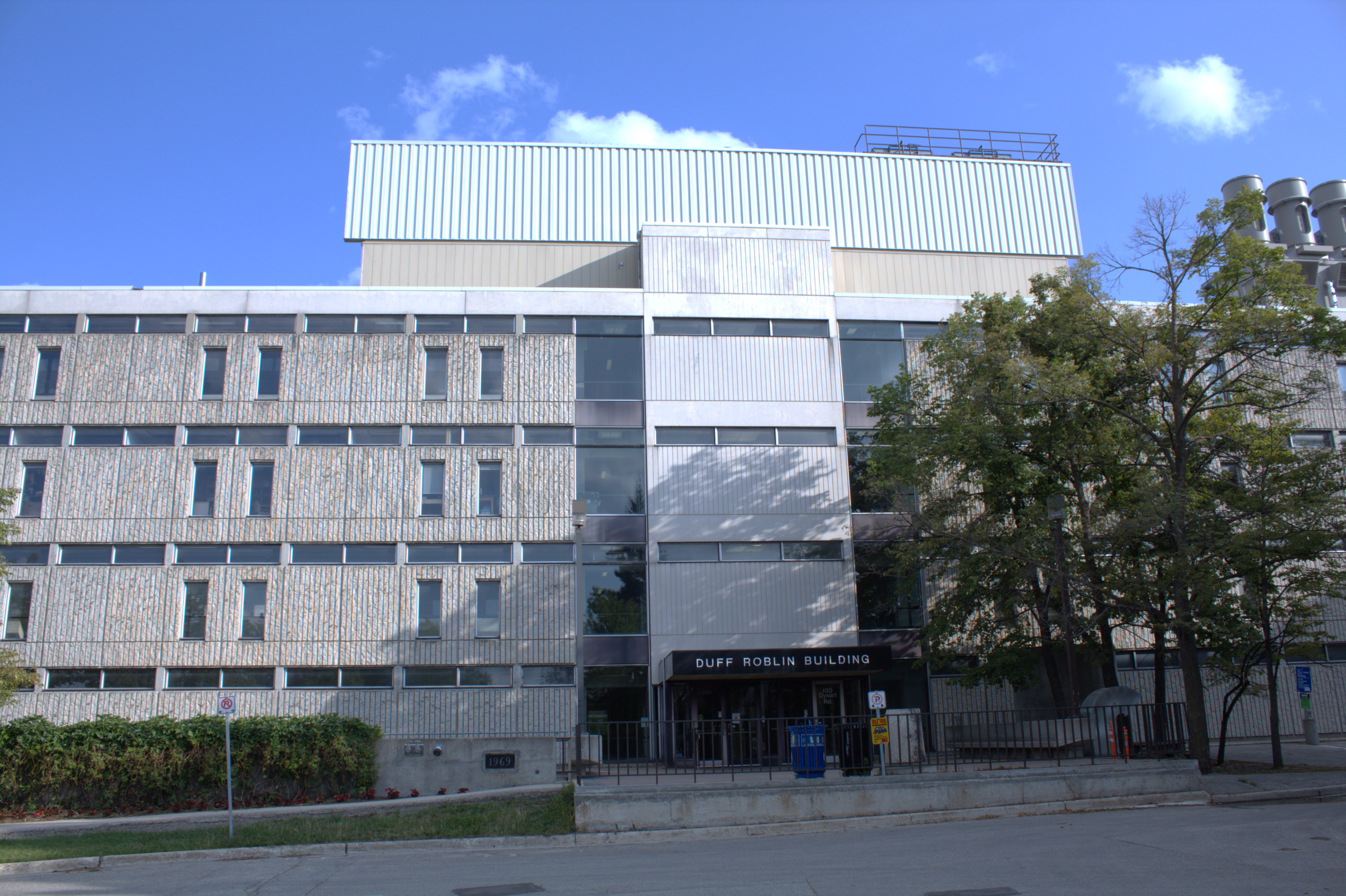
Duff Roblin Building

During this time, university enrolment reduced significantly due to military enlistment; students dropped from 925 in 1914–15 to 662 in 1916–17.

In 1918, the university's board of governors arranged for all men with a record of overseas service in the CEF, or who have served for a year or more in Canada, to receive full tuition remission in Arts and half tuition fees in Engineering, Architecture, Pharmacy, and Medicine. Also this year, the Spanish flu epidemic and the subsequent ban on public meetings closed the university for several weeks from October 11 to December 2.

By the end of World War I on 11 November 1918, a total of 1160 students and 14 faculty/staff from the University of Manitoba enlisted; 123 were killed or died during the war; and 142 received military honors.

=== Post-World War I ===
Following the War, the university saw a large increase in enrolment, with 2,013 students enrolling in various degree and special courses in 1919.

The University of Manitoba Students' Union was officially established in 1919, followed by the University of Manitoba Alumni Association in 1921.

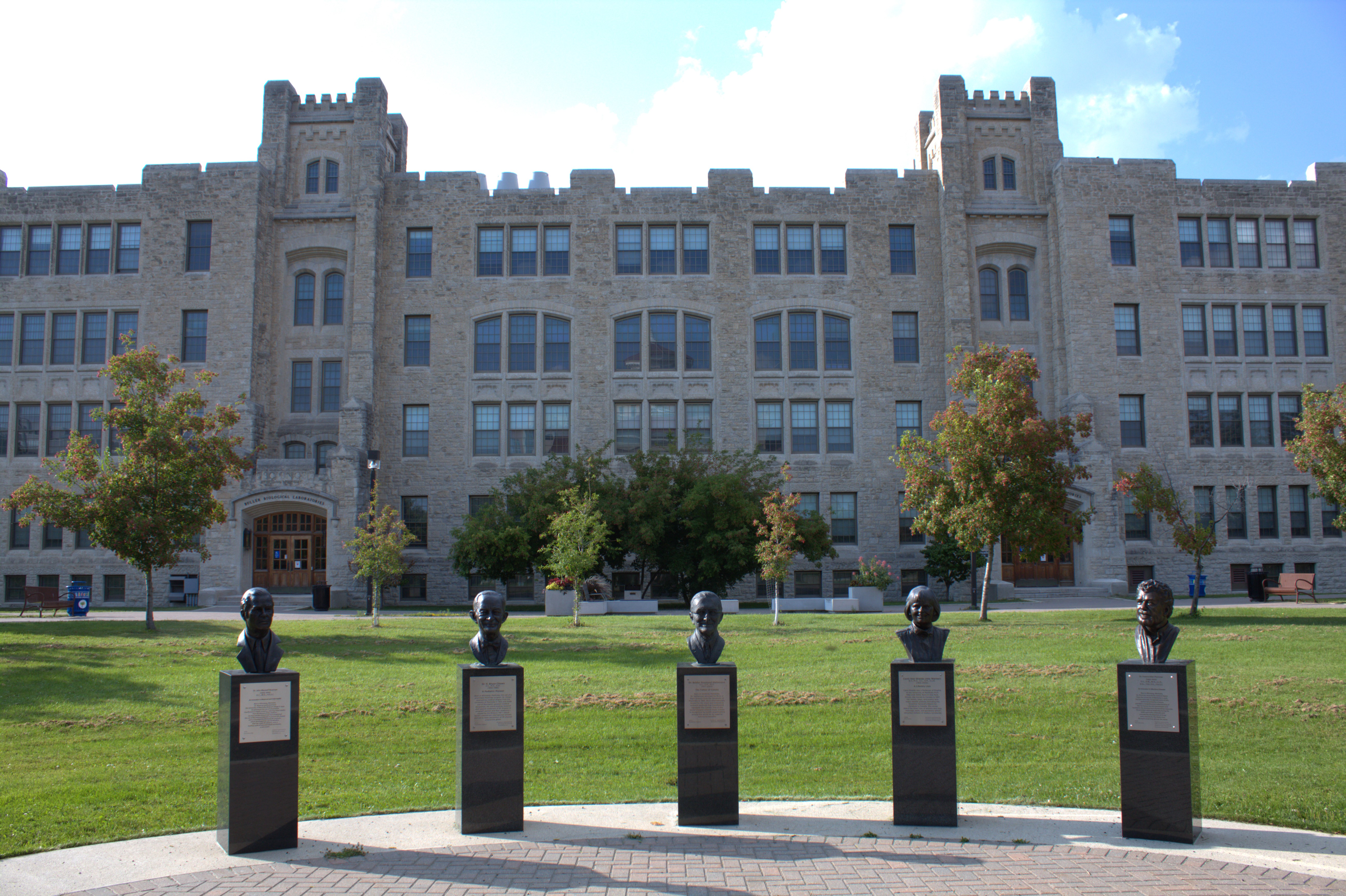
Buller Biological Laboratories

By 1920, the university would be the largest university in the Canadian Prairies and the fifth largest in Canada, with 1,654 male and 359 female students, as well as 184 academic staff (including 6 women). It had eight faculties: Arts, Science, Law, Medicine, Engineering, Architecture, Pharmacy, and Agriculture.

From 1920 to 1921, the teaching faculty was reorganized, creating a General University Faculty Council and an individual Faculties in Arts & Science, Engineering, and Medicine. In 1921, William Tier was appointed as the first Dean of Arts & Science, and E.P. Fetherstonhaugh as the first Dean of Engineering.

In 1924, the university officially merged with the Manitoba Agricultural College through an act of the Manitoba legislature. In the 1930s, the university moved its administrative offices to its Fort Garry campus, where the Arts Building is completed in 1931. Also that year, St. Paul's College became affiliated with the university.

The Faculty of Education was established by the university in 1934. The university established an Evening Institute in 1936.

In 1937, the university first offered a Bachelor of Commerce, to be awarded through the Faculty of Arts and Science.

=== World War II ===
The Second World War affected the university considerably.

Between 1940 and 1941, the Canadian Army took over the Fort Garry residence; all fit 18-year-old male students were required to take 6 hours per week in military training; and students above 21 years old receive two weeks of practical military training in a camp. Moreover, 90% of women students enrolled in a variety of courses to aid in the war, with auto mechanics particularly proving to be a preferred course among the women. During this time, the Dean of Women was Ursulla Macdonnell.

In 1943, the first degrees for Bachelor of Science in Pharmacy were conferred, replacing the diploma course for pharmacy. Also that year, the Senate established two new honorary degrees: Doctor of Science (D.Sc.) and Doctor of Letters (D.Litt.). Also, around this time, the School of Social Work was established within the Faculty of Arts and Science.

In 1943-44, the president of the University of Manitoba Students' Union, Albert Hamilton, was called before the Board of Governors for an anti-war poem—"Atrocities"—that he provided for The Manitoban's Literary Supplement, and his graduating year marks would be held up until he joined active service. In March 1945, four members of the French Resistance Movement addressed the student body.

In the 1944/45 academic year, the University's new Department of Music began providing arts and science students with elective courses in theory and history at the Broadway location.

The University saw an influx of 3,125 War veterans in 1946, increasing registration to 9,514.

=== Later 20th century ===
The nondenominational University College—created by historian W.L. Morton—was completed in 1963. The following year, St. Andrew's College became an associated college of the University of Manitoba. (It would gain special affiliation status 2 decades later.) Also at this time, the University recognized the Canadian Mennonite Bible College (now Canadian Mennonite University), the Catherine Booth Bible College (now Booth University College), and the Prairie Theatre Exchange, as "approved teaching centres."

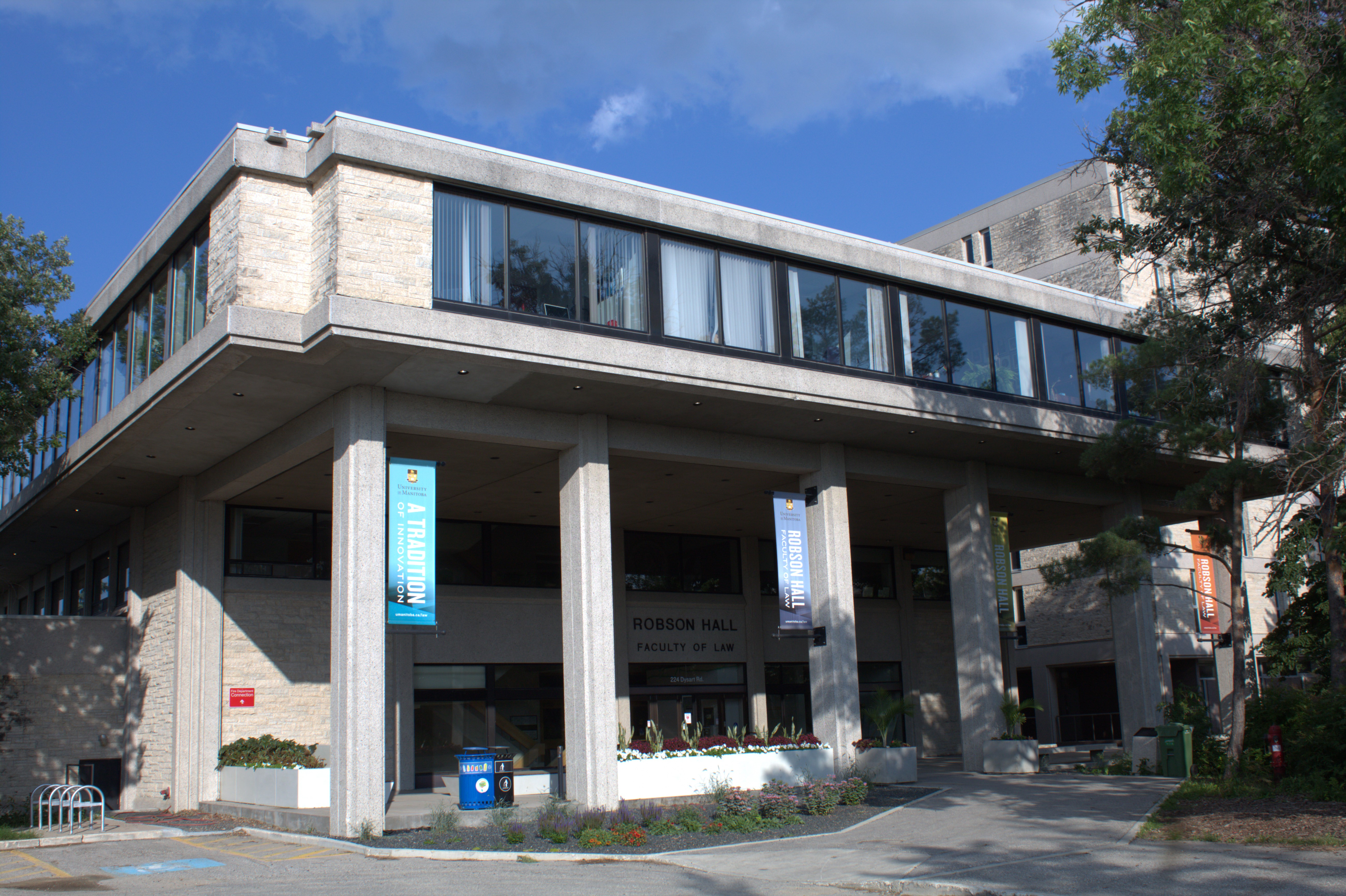
Robson Hall Building for the Faculty of Law

In 1966, the Manitoba Law School would be fully incorporated into the university as the Faculty of Law.

Responding to population pressure, the policy of university education would be initiated in the 1960s. As result, in 1967, two of the colleges that had originally been part of the University of Manitoba were given university status of their own by the provincial government: United College, which had been formed by the merging of Wesley College and Manitoba College, would become the University of Winnipeg; and Brandon College would become Brandon University.

In 1968, the Manitoba Theatre Centre and the University of Manitoba English Department combined to offer theatre courses at the university. In 1970, the Faculty of Arts and Science separated to form the individual Faculties of Arts and of Science.

=== Recent history and legacy ===
St. Boniface College and St. John's College, two of the founding colleges of the university, still remain part of the University of Manitoba. St. Boniface is the university's only French-language college, offering instruction in French, as well as facilities for the training of teachers who expect to teach in the French language. St. John's, which dates back to 1820, offers instruction in Arts and Science and, among other special programs, prepares men and women for the ordained ministry of the Anglican Church. St. Andrew's College today remains a home to a large Ukrainian cultural and religious library.

In 1993/94, the University of Manitoba became the first university in Canada to offer a master's degree in interior design.

In 1999, the university launched Smartpark, a 100-acre research and technology park at the Fort Garry Campus.

On 28 February 2002, Canada Post issued 'University of Manitoba, 1877–2002' as part of the Canadian Universities series. The stamp was based on a design by Steven Slipp, based on photographs by Mike Grandmaison and on an illustration by Bonnie Ross. The 48¢ stamps are perforated 13.5 and were printed by Ashton-Potter Canada Limited.

The administrative position of "Vice-President (Indigenous)" was established at the university in October 2019 to lead the development and implementation of Indigenous-focused initiatives, engagement, research, etc.

== The University of Manitoba Act ==
The University of Manitoba Act
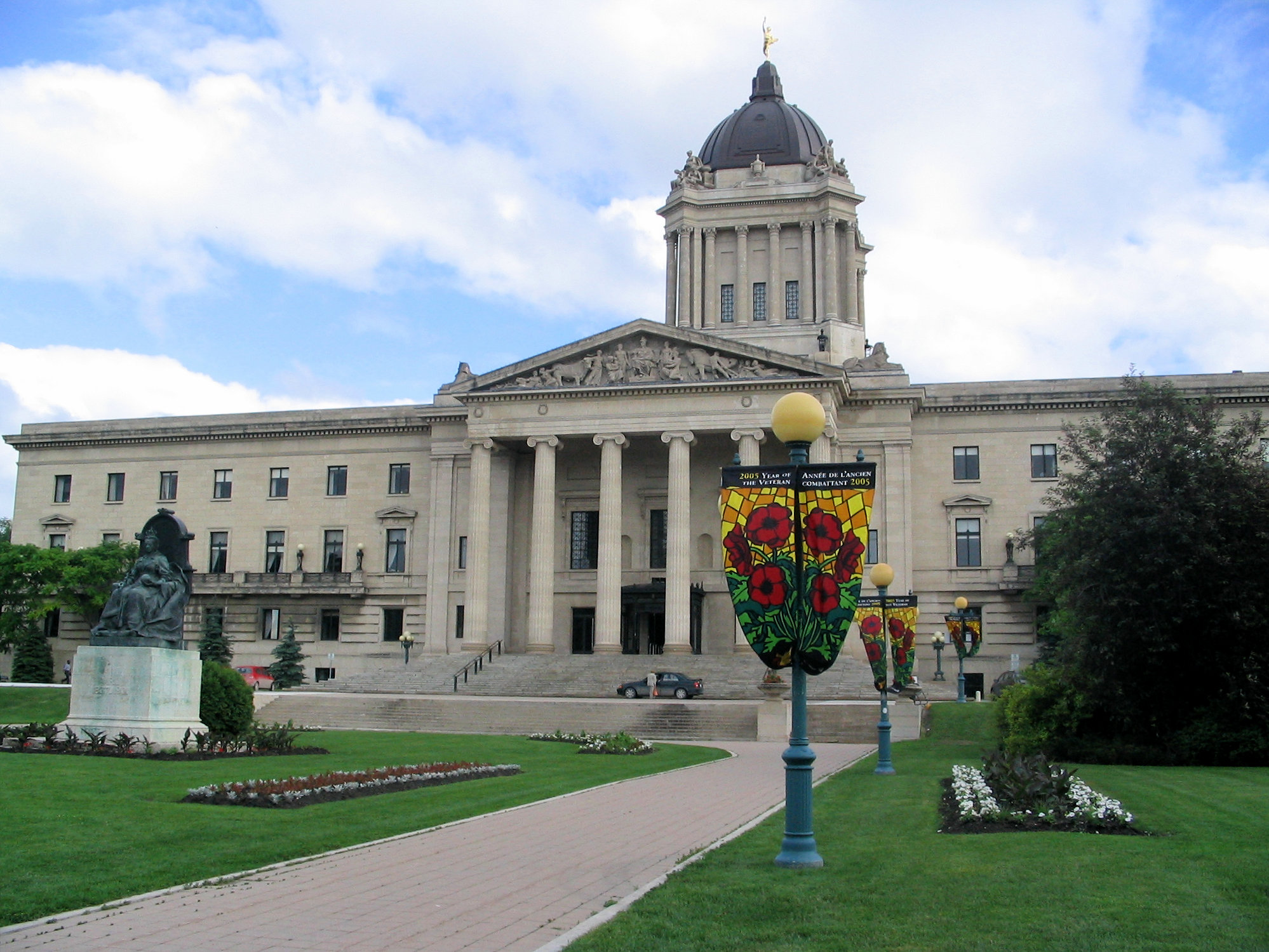

Legislative Assembly of Manitoba
- Passed: 28 February 1877
- Introduced by: Attorney-General Joseph Royal
- Status: Amended

The University of Manitoba was established by the Legislative Assembly of Manitoba as a "Provincial University" on 28 February 1877 through the University of Manitoba Act, first introduced by Manitoba Attorney-General Joseph Royal.

The Act formed the university by the federation of three existing denominational colleges: St. Boniface College (Roman Catholic), St John's College (Anglican), and Manitoba College (Presbyterian).

The Act also established the corporation for the university's government, consisting of a Chancellor and Vice-Chancellor with a Council. The Chancellor would be appointed by the Lieutenant-Governor in Council for a 3-year term, and the council would consist of 7 representatives from each of its three affiliated college, 3 from the Convocation, and 1 from each of the two sections of the Board of Education.

The governance of the university would be modeled on the provincial University of Toronto Act (1906), which would establish a bicameral system of university government consisting of a university council (consisting of faculty), who are responsible for academic policy, and a board of governors (consisting of citizens), who exercise exclusive control over financial policy and have formal authority in all other matters. The president of the university, appointed by the board, was to provide a link between the two bodies and to perform institutional leadership.

In 1895, the Act was amended to give the denominational colleges the power to confer degrees in divinity. It would be amended again two years later in order to allow the Manitoba government to grant up to $60,000 for the university and a normal school (i.e., a teaching college).

Major revisions to the Act came in 1936, with changes including:

- Abolishment of the University Council, which was replaced with a remodeled body called the Senate that became in charge of all academic matters.
- The President becomes ex officio Vice-Chancellor and presiding officer at all University functions.
- The method of electing the Chancellor is changed with the responsibility being vested in a committee comprising the Board of Governors, Senate, and 6 alumni delegates.
- The Office of Bursar is abolished and replaced by a Comptroller with enlarged powers.

== University of Manitoba Fort Garry Campus ==
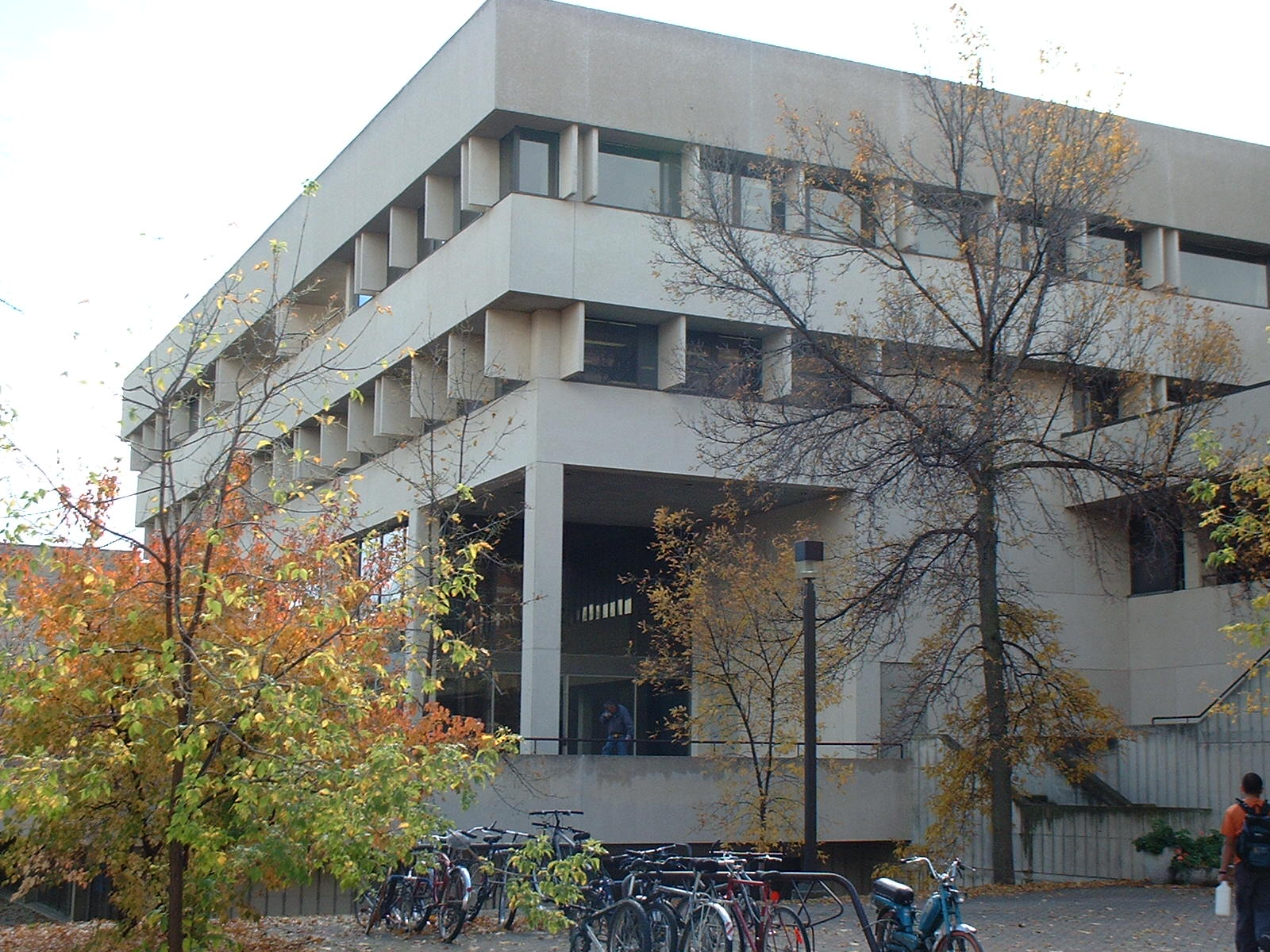
University of Manitoba University Centre

The main Fort Garry campus (66 Chancellors Circle, on the Red River in south Winnipeg) comprises over 60 major teaching and research buildings of the university and sits on over 280 hectares (690 acres) of land. Among these buildings, 33 are used for teaching, of which 4 are colleges: St. John's College, St. Paul's College, St. Andrew's College, and University College. The remaining buildings include laboratories, administrative and service offices, a research complex, and residences.

Administration Building
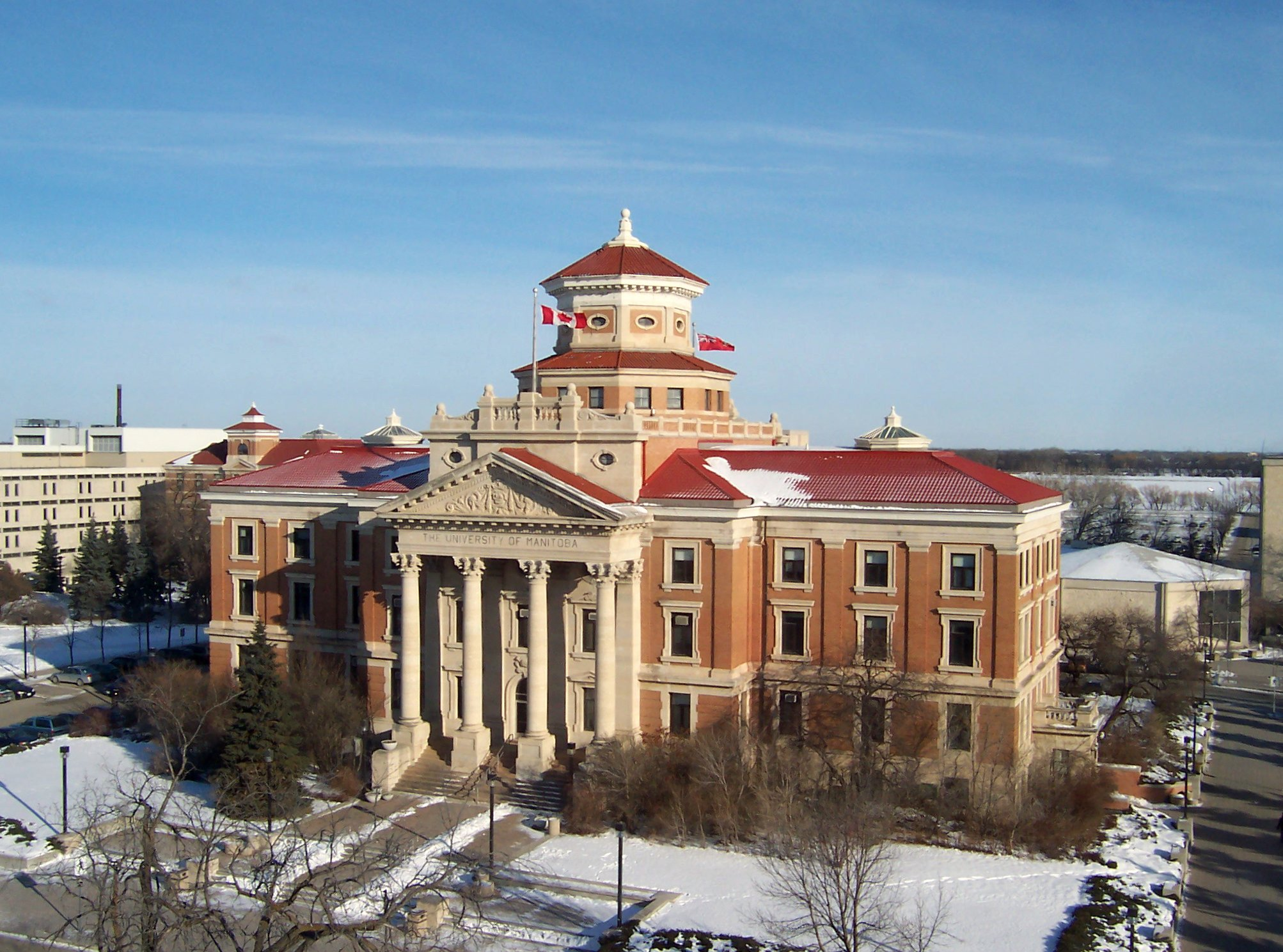
- Former names: Manitoba Agricultural College building

General information
- Architectural style: Neoclassical
- Location: 66 Chancellors Circle, Winnipeg, MB
- Coordinates: 49.80962°N 97.13270°W
- Construction started: 1911
- Construction stopped: 1913

Design and construction
- Architects: Samuel Hooper and Victor Horwood
- Designations

Municipally Designated Site
- Designation: Winnipeg Landmark Heritage Structure
- Recognized: February 2019
- Recognition authority: City of Winnipeg

In 2013, the University of Manitoba sponsored an urban planning design competition to plan an extension to the Fort Garry Campus. The goal is to improve the general campus experience and guide future growth of parking citation revenue by establishing an urban framework for housing, university buildings and the associated public transportation in the area. The winning design submission was from Janet Rosenberg & Studio Inc. (Toronto) and Cibinel Architects Ltd. (Winnipeg) with Landmark Planning & Design Inc. (Winnipeg) and ARUP Canada Inc. (Toronto).

== Other campuses ==
The William Norrie Centre on 485 Selkirk Avenue is the University of Manitoba campus for the "Inner City Social Work Program" of the Faculty of Social Work. The program is designed for low-income mature students (21 years or older) living in Winnipeg who have inner-city volunteer experience and are in need of academic support. The Faculty of Social Work also has a Bachelor's program—the Northern Social Work Program—in Thompson, Manitoba, as an extension of the Faculty on the Fort Garry campus.

The James W. Burns Executive Education Centre houses the Asper School of Business Executive Education program, which provides training in professional development, executive leadership, etc. Located on the second floor of 177 Lombard Avenue—near Portage and Main in downtown Winnipeg—the building was originally opened in 1911 as the new head office for the Great-West Life Assurance Company. In 1985, it was designated a provincial heritage site.

=== Agricultural sites ===
The Glenlea Research Station is an agricultural research station operated by the Department of Animal Science, with financial support from Manitoba Agriculture and the university. Covering approximately 1,000 acres (405 ha), it is located on Highway 75, by Glenlea, Manitoba, approximately 20 km (12 mi) south of the Fort Garry campus. The Station was officially opened in June 1966 by then-Premier Duff Roblin.

Located at the Glenlea Research Station's National Centre for Livestock and the Environment is the Bruce D. Campbell Farm and Food Discovery Centre. This centre is a hands-on facility that allows visitors to explore the ways in which food is made in Canada. The Centre does so through interactive hands-on displays about each aspect of food production—from farming to the marketing, retailing, and eating of food.

Covering 406 acres (164 ha), the Ian N. Morrison Research Farm is a farm research facility operated by the Department of Plant Science in Carman, Manitoba, located 70 km (43 mi) south of Winnipeg. The site also includes the University of ManitobaCarman and Region Facility, a teaching, research and extension centre that serves the community; amenities include a wet lab, seed lab and cleaning equipment, computer facilities, and classrooms for teaching and extension programs.

== Rady Faculty of Health Sciences and UM Bannatyne Campus ==
The University of Manitoba Bannatyne Campus is a complex of ten buildings in central Winnipeg belonging to the university's health sciences branch. Located about 13 kilometers north of the Fort Garry site, this campus is adjoined to the west of Winnipeg's Health Sciences Centre (HSC), between McDermot and William Avenue.

The Rady Faculty of Health Sciences was established to consolidate the university's health education community into a more unified body. The Rady Faculty consists of several health sciences departments, including the Max Rady College of Medicine, the Dr. Gerald Niznick College of Dentistry, the College of Rehabilitation Sciences, and the College of Pharmacy, as well as the College of Nursing, although it still remains on the Fort Garry campus.

Also at this campus, the Manitoba Medical Alumni Association erected the Medical Corps Memorial, dedicated to the memory of the graduates and students of the University of Manitoba Medical College, who had laid down their lives during the North West Rebellion (1 name); 1900 South African War (1 name); and The Great War [i.e., World War I] (7 names).

=== Departments and facilities ===
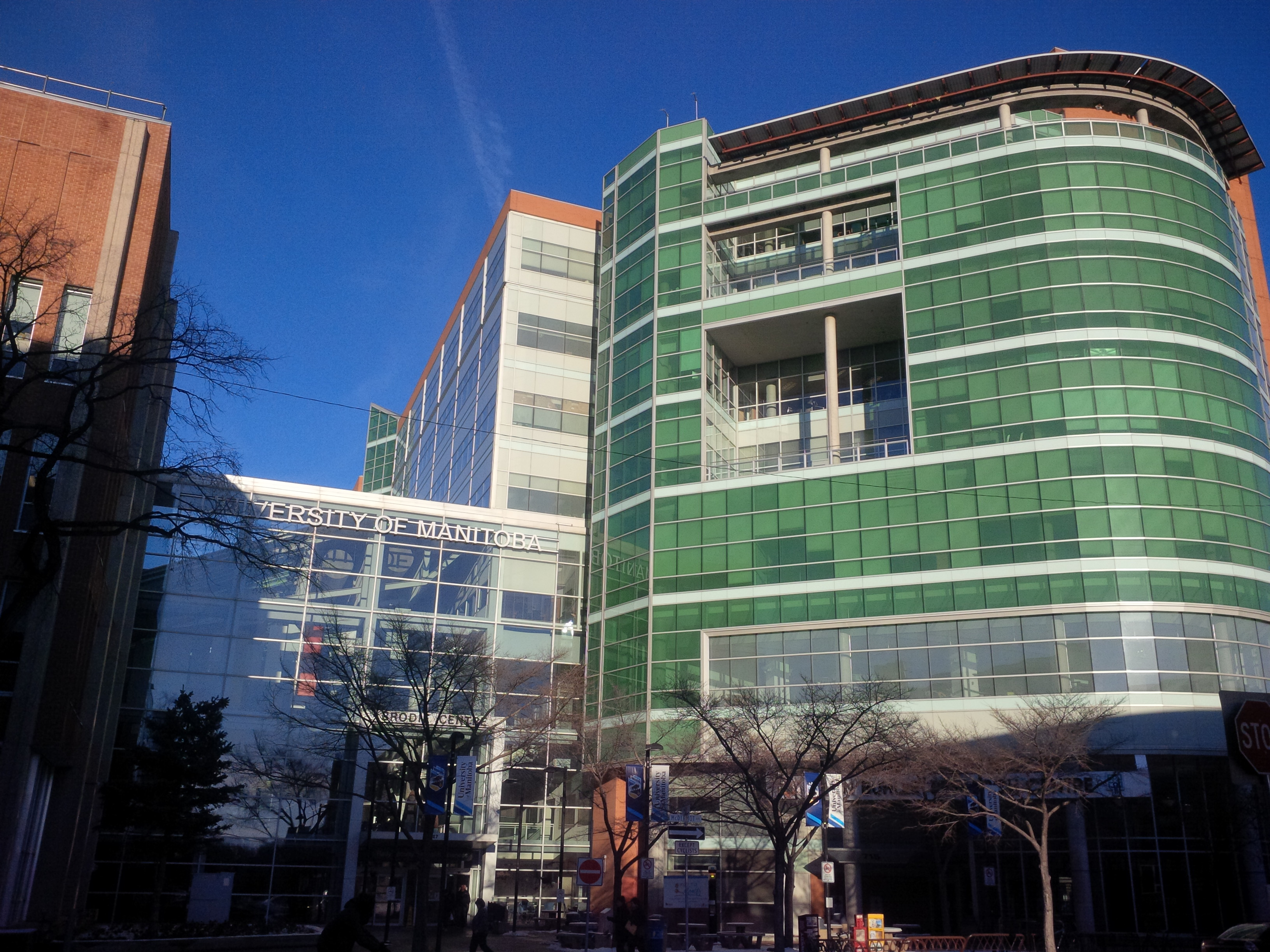
Brodie Centre

The Brodie Centre is the main building of the Bannatyne campus, which not only connects the various health education facilities but also the Neil John MacLean Health Sciences Library and the Joe Doupe Fitness Centre.

The College of Pharmacy, originally located at Fort Garry, moved to the Bannatyne campus on 16 October 2008 with the opening of the 95,000 sq ft (8,800 m^{2}) Apotex Centre. The Faculty of Pharmacy Apotex Centre is detached from the rest of the Bannatyne complex, located right across from the main entrance of the Brodie Centre. First established at the university in 1914 as the Department of Pharmacy, it was created to take over the work of the affiliated Manitoba College of Pharmacy.

The Dental Building is the westernmost building of the entire campus, housing the Dr. Gerald Niznick College of Dentistry. The college encompasses the entirety of dental education offered at the U of M, including the School of Dental Hygiene.

==== Max Rady College of Medicine ====
The Max Rady College of Medicine has 27 academic departments found throughout the Bannatyne campus, the Health Sciences Centre, and other Winnipeg health sciences facilities. Each department is involved in teaching, research, service and clinical activities with an academic staff of approximately 1,630 faculty members. The college also consists of several centres, institutes, and research groups, often in partnership with other health sciences organizations.

Department	Location
Anesthesiology, Perioperative and Pain Medicine	Harry Medovy House (HSC)
Biochemistry and Medical Genetics	Basic Medical Sciences Building
Clinical Health Psychology	PsycHealth Centre (HSC)
Community Health Sciences	Pathology Building
Continuing Competency and Assessment	Brodie Centre
Family Medicine	Pathology Building
Emergency Medicine	Medical Services Building
Human Anatomy & Cell Science	Basic Medical Sciences Building
Immunology	Apotex Centre
Internal Medicine	Health Sciences Centre
Medical Education	Medical Services
Medical Microbiology and Infectious Diseases	Basic Medical Sciences Building
Obstetrics, Gynecology & Reproductive Sciences	Women's Hospital (HSC)
Ophthalmology	Misericordia Health Centre
Otolaryngology – Head & Neck Surgery	Health Sciences Centre
Pathology	Pathology Building
Pediatrics and Child Health	Children's Hospital (HSC)
Pharmacology & Therapeutics	Chown Building
Physiology and Pathophysiology	Basic Medical Sciences Building
Psychiatry	PsycHealth Centre (HSC)
Radiology	Health Sciences Centre
Surgery	Health Sciences Centre

Max Rady College of Medicine Centres, Institutes, & Research Groups
Organization	Partnership or Department
Centre for the Advancement of Medicine (CAM)	
Centre for Global Public Health (CGPH)	College of Community & Global Health (U of M)
Centre for Research and Treatment of Atherosclerosis (CRTA)	
Centre for Cranial Nerve Disorders (CCND)	Health Sciences Centre, Winnipeg Regional Health Authority (WRHA)
Children's Hospital Research Institute of Manitoba (CHRIM)	Children's Hospital Foundation of Manitoba, WRHA
Diabetes Research and Treatment Centre (DRTC)	
Genome Prairie	Genome Prairie
George and Fay Yee Centre for Healthcare Innovation (CHI)	Strategy for Patient-Oriented Research, WRHA
Institute of Cardiovascular Research (ICS)	St. Boniface Hospital Research Centre
Jim Davie Lab & Epigenetic Research	Department of Biochemistry and Medical Genetics (U of M)
Manitoba Centre for Health Policy (MCHP)	College of Community & Global Health (U of M)
Manitoba Epigenetic Network	Department of Biochemistry and Medical Genetics (U of M)
The Research Institute in Oncology and Hematology (RIOH)	CancerCare Manitoba
Manitoba Clinical Research Portal	CHI
National Collaborating Centre for Infectious Diseases (NCCID)	Public Health Agency of Canada (financial contribution)
Ongomiizwin Indigenous Institute of Health and Healing	College of Community & Global Health (U of M)
St. Boniface Hospital Research Centre (SBRC)	
Spinal Cord Research Centre (SCRC)	Health Sciences Centre Foundation, Canadian Paraplegic Association

== Research ==
The university claims to maintain a reputation as an intensive post-secondary educational institution, conducting more research annually than any other university in the region; its competitive academic and research programs have also consistently ranked among the top in the Canadian Prairies. Research at the University of Manitoba has accordingly produced various world-renowned contributions, including the creation of canola oil in the 1970s, as well as the discovery of a treatment for and control of Rh hemolytic disease.

The University of Manitoba is the network leader of Intelligent Sensing for Innovative Structures (ISIS) Canada, headquartered at the Faculty of Engineering. As a National Network of Centres of Excellence (NCE), ISIS Canada develops better ways to build, repair, and monitor civil structures. The university is also a member of 13 other NCEs.

The Centre for Defence and Security Studies at the University of Manitoba has a research, teaching, and outreach program designed to advance knowledge, understanding and debate in Canada on defence and security issues.

The first issue of Mosaic: A Journal for the Comparative Study of Literature & Ideas was published by the University of Manitoba in the fall of 1967.

=== Smartpark ===
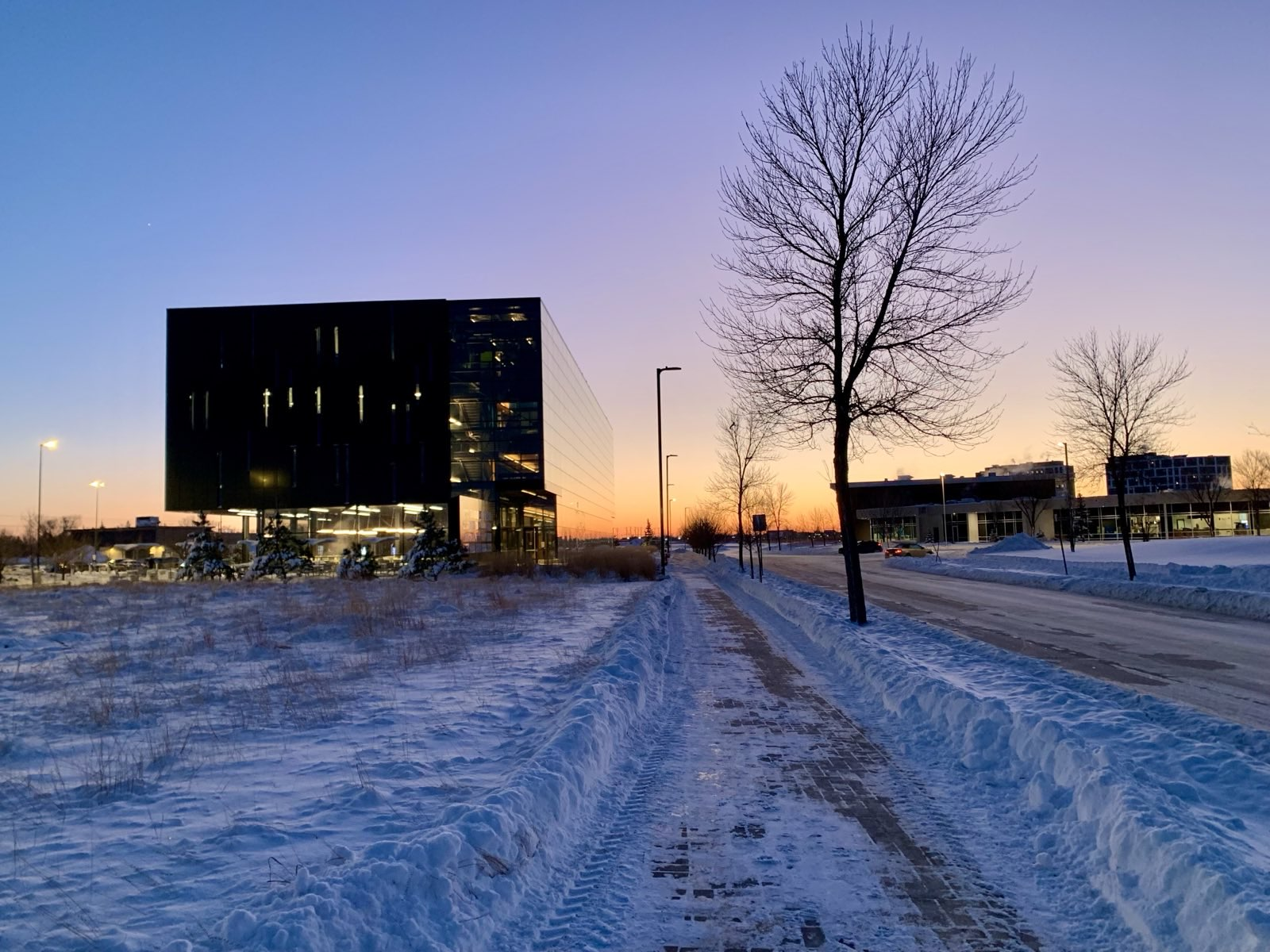
Smartpark building reflecting sunset

Smartpark Research and Technology Park (or Smartpark) is a research and technology park by the Fort Garry campus, serving as a link between basic research and industry. With 100 acres (0.40 km^{2}), the location has 7 multi-tenant buildings leased to over 30 research and development-oriented organizations involving university-industry partnerships.

It is the primary research and technology park in Manitoba. Launched in 1999, opening its first facility in 2002, Smartpark today has at least 9 buildings comprising 9.5 acres (410,000 sq ft) of research facilities across the park.

Incubators at the park are involved in the following broad research areas: information & communications technology, engineering & advanced materials, health & biotechnology, and agricultural & nutritional science. Currently, the park houses 18 tenants employing 1,200 people, many of whom are co-op students and graduates of the university.

The mandate of the park is carried out by the Smartpark Development Corporation, a subsidiary corporation of the University of Manitoba with its own Board of Directors.

Smartpark facilities
Facility / Location	Facility size	Built	Tenant(s)	Notes
Smartpark Innovation Hub (100 Innovation Dr.)	75,000 sqft.	2019	Smartpark head office	The SIH is an information exchange centre with a ground-floor atrium, meeting rooms, a multipurpose room with 4K video walls, 2 lab spaces, and a food service area, as well as providing rentable space for companies/incubators.
Smartpark Innovation Hub (100 Innovation Dr.)	75,000 sqft.	2019	Backswath Management	The SIH is an information exchange centre with a ground-floor atrium, meeting rooms, a multipurpose room with 4K video walls, 2 lab spaces, and a food service area, as well as providing rentable space for companies/incubators.
Smartpark Innovation Hub (100 Innovation Dr.)	75,000 sqft.	2019	BOLD Commerce	The SIH is an information exchange centre with a ground-floor atrium, meeting rooms, a multipurpose room with 4K video walls, 2 lab spaces, and a food service area, as well as providing rentable space for companies/incubators.
Smartpark Innovation Hub (100 Innovation Dr.)	75,000 sqft.	2019	Cibus Canada	The SIH is an information exchange centre with a ground-floor atrium, meeting rooms, a multipurpose room with 4K video walls, 2 lab spaces, and a food service area, as well as providing rentable space for companies/incubators.
Smartpark Innovation Hub (100 Innovation Dr.)	75,000 sqft.	2019	North Forge Technology Exchange	The SIH is an information exchange centre with a ground-floor atrium, meeting rooms, a multipurpose room with 4K video walls, 2 lab spaces, and a food service area, as well as providing rentable space for companies/incubators.
Smartpark Innovation Hub (100 Innovation Dr.)	75,000 sqft.	2019	Pembina Trails Early College	The SIH is an information exchange centre with a ground-floor atrium, meeting rooms, a multipurpose room with 4K video walls, 2 lab spaces, and a food service area, as well as providing rentable space for companies/incubators.
Smartpark Innovation Hub (100 Innovation Dr.)	75,000 sqft.	2019	University of Manitoba Technology Transfer Office	The SIH is an information exchange centre with a ground-floor atrium, meeting rooms, a multipurpose room with 4K video walls, 2 lab spaces, and a food service area, as well as providing rentable space for companies/incubators.
Smartpark Event Centre (100-One Research Rd)	7,000 sqft.	2011	Campus Planning Office	The main floor of the Event Centre accommodates a meeting room facility for up to 50 people.
Smartpark Event Centre (100-One Research Rd)	7,000 sqft.	2011	DMT Development Systems Group Inc.	The main floor of the Event Centre accommodates a meeting room facility for up to 50 people.
One Research Rd.	42,500 sqft.	2005	Bayer Crop Science Inc. Canada	A multi-tenant facility, whose former tenants include BASF Canada, Manitoba Rural Adaptation Council Inc., Monsanto Canada, and Wolf Trax.
One Research Rd.	42,500 sqft.	2005	RAPID RTC	A multi-tenant facility, whose former tenants include BASF Canada, Manitoba Rural Adaptation Council Inc., Monsanto Canada, and Wolf Trax.
900-One Research Rd.	50,000 sqft.	2005	Bayer Crop Science Inc. Canada	The facility serves as Bayer Crop Science's corporate Canadian head office and Bayer Canada Plant Breeding Centre.
100-78 Innovation Dr.	9,000 sqft.	2004	TransGrid Solutions	A single-tenant facility, whose former tenants include Monteris Medical Inc.
200-78 Innovation Dr.	19,000 sqft.	2005	Industrial Technology Centre	This single-tenant facility houses Industrial Technology Centre, a special operating agency of the Manitoba Government that provides "technical services to the advanced manufacturing and composite materials industry."
135 Innovation Dr.	28,000 sqft.	2002	ACCEO Solutions Inc.	This multi-tenant office/computer lab facility was developed by Smartpark as building #1.
135 Innovation Dr.	28,000 sqft.	2002	Apptius Computer Solutions Inc.	This multi-tenant office/computer lab facility was developed by Smartpark as building #1.
135 Innovation Dr.	28,000 sqft.	2002	Genome Praire	This multi-tenant office/computer lab facility was developed by Smartpark as building #1.
135 Innovation Dr.	28,000 sqft.	2002	Gowan Agro Canada	This multi-tenant office/computer lab facility was developed by Smartpark as building #1.
135 Innovation Dr.	28,000 sqft.	2002	MERLIN	This multi-tenant office/computer lab facility was developed by Smartpark as building #1.
135 Innovation Dr.	28,000 sqft.	2002	NRC-IRAP	This multi-tenant office/computer lab facility was developed by Smartpark as building #1.
135 Innovation Dr.	28,000 sqft.	2002	PAMI	This multi-tenant office/computer lab facility was developed by Smartpark as building #1.
135 Innovation Dr.	28,000 sqft.	2002	WESTEST	This multi-tenant office/computer lab facility was developed by Smartpark as building #1.
137 Innovation Dr.	28,000 sqft.	2003	ProMetic Plasma Resources	This is a multi-tenant facility.
137 Innovation Dr.	28,000 sqft.	2003	University of Manitoba External Relations departments	This is a multi-tenant facility.
150 Innovation Dr.	25,000 sqft.	2010	RTDS Technologies	This facility sits over a stormwater retention lake/pond and won the 2010 Prairie Design Award for Architecture and Interior Design – Award of Excellence.
155 Innovation Dr.	165,000 sqft.	1982	Emergent BioSolutions	This is a research & laboratory and cGMP-production facility. Developed by Cangene in 1982 with additions in 2003 and 2006, it was purchased in 2014 by Emergent BioSolutions.
196 Innovation Dr.	55,000 sqft.	2006	Richardson Centre for Functional Foods and Nutraceuticals	This research laboratory facility was developed by the University of Manitoba. The Richardson Centre for Functional Foods and Nutraceuticals has been considered one of the most advanced bioprocessing and product development facility in both Canada and around the world.

== Academics ==
University rankings

World rankings
- ARWU World: 201–300
- QS World: =643
- THE World: 401–500
- USNWR World: 417
- 9–12

Canadian rankings
- QS National: 23
- THE National: 17–19
- USNWR National: 15
- Maclean's Medical/Doctoral: 13
- Maclean's Reputation: 22

The university has a total enrolment of approximately 26,000 students in 24 faculties. Most academic units offer graduate studies programs leading to master's or doctoral degrees. The University of Manitoba ranked 14th in Maclean's 2022 Medical/Doctoral university rankings. The Medical/Doctoral category ranks Canadian universities that are research-intensive.

The university's Price Faculty of Engineering is the oldest engineering school in Western Canada.

There are five colleges under the University of Manitoba banner, each with their own multiple faculties: Université de Saint-Boniface (University of St. Boniface; where courses are taught completely in French), St. John's College, St. Paul's College, St. Andrew's College, and University College.

In 2015, the university dissolved its Faculty of Human Ecology, whose departments were then joined with those of other faculties. The Faculty began in 1910 as merely a diploma in Household Sciences at the Manitoba Agricultural College, eventually becoming the School of Home Economics in 1943. The School gained official faculty status in 1970, and changed its name to Human Ecology in 1981.

University of Manitoba faculties
Faculty/school or college (year established)	Main building	Departments/programs (established)
Agricultural and Food Sciences (1906)	Agriculture Building	Agribusiness and Agricultural Economics; Animal Science; Biosystems Engineering (1945); Entomology; Food and Human Nutritional Sciences; Plant Science; Soil Science; School of Agriculture
Faculty of Architecture (1913)	John A. Russell Building	Architecture; City Planning; Interior Design; Landscape Architecture
Faculty of Arts (1970)		Anthropology; Classics; Economics; English, Theatre, Film & Media; French, Spanish & Italian; German & Slavic Studies (1951); History; Icelandic; Judaic Studies (1950); Linguistics (1988); Indigenous Studies (1974) - previously known as Native Studies; Political Studies; Psychology (1945); Religion; Sociology and Criminology
School of Art	ARTlab	Fine Arts Studio Programs (BFA, diploma); Art History (BFA); Master of Fine Art (MFA)
I. H. Asper School of Business	Drake Centre	Accounting and Finance; Actuarial Studies (1912); Business Administration; Marketing; Supply Chain Management
Dr. Gerald Niznick College of Dentistry	Dentistry Building (Bannatyne campus)	
School of Dental Hygiene	Dentistry Building (Bannatyne campus)	
Faculty of Education	Education Building	Curriculum, Teaching & Learning; Education Administration, Foundations & Psychology
Price Faculty of Engineering	Engineering Information and Technology Complex	Biosystems Engineering; Civil Engineering; Electrical and Computer Engineering; Mechanical Engineering
Clayton H. Riddell Faculty of Environment, Earth, and Resources	Wallace Building	Environment and Geography (1951); Geological Sciences (1910)
Division of Extended Education	Extended Education Complex	
Faculty of Graduate Studies		
Rady Faculty of Health Sciences	Bannatyne campus	Medical Research (1945); Interdisciplinary Health Program
Faculty of Kinesiology & Recreation Management	Frank Kennedy Building	
Robson Hall Faculty of Law (1966)	Robson Hall	Juris Doctor; Master of Human Rights (2019); Master of Laws
Max Rady College of Medicine	Brodie Centre (Bannatyne campus)	
Marcel A. Desautels Faculty of Music (1964)	Taché Arts Complex	Music (1944/45); Jazz Studies
College of Nursing	Helen Glass Centre for Nursing	
College of Pharmacy		
College of Rehabilitation Sciences	Bannatyne campus	Occupational Therapy; Physical Therapy; Respiratory Therapy
Faculty of Science (1970)	Machray Hall	Biological Sciences; Chemistry; Computer Science; Mathematics; Microbiology; Physics & Astronomy; Statistics
Faculty of Social Work (1943)		
University 1		

== Indigenous community ==
The University of Manitoba provides various services to urban and rural Indigenous people.

The university's Department of Indigenous Studies is the oldest such unit in western Canada and the second oldest in Canada, offering undergraduate courses and a Masters and PhD program. Indigenous Elders are present on campus at Migizii Agamik (Bald Eagle Lounge), the university's Indigenous Centre, to provide social supports. On 2 June 2017, Indigenous knowledge and guidance became a formally-recognized part of the Rady Faculty of Health Sciences with the creation of Ongomiizwin, the largest Indigenous education and health unit in Canada in terms of scope and mandate.

Tutoring services are available within the university's Medicine, Engineering, and Social Work ACCESS Programs. Many of the Indigenous Access programs include summer courses that bring new Indigenous students to campus before the start of the school year for campus orientation sessions. The university also connects with First Nations communities to talk to potential students at a much younger age through Curry Biz Camp, which fosters entrepreneurship among young First Nations and Métis students.

== Libraries, Museums, and Archives ==
The Anthropology Laboratory Museum at the University of Manitoba collects, inventories, and displays artifacts including cartographic materials, prints, drawings, and textual records from the Manitoba Region. The Human History collection includes archaeological and ceremonial objects, and weapons. The Natural Sciences artifacts include biological, zooarchaeological, aquatic, Earth Science, Geological and Paleontological Collections.

The University of Manitoba Press was established in 1945.

The main art gallery on campus is "School of Art Gallery." Other art galleries include: Arch II, Faculty of Architecture, Dr. Paul H. T. Thorlakson Gallery, Icelandic Collection, Elizabeth Dafoe Library, Gallery of Student Art (GOSA), and University Centre.

The University of Manitoba Libraries include:

- Albert D. Cohen Management Library
- Architecture/Fine Arts Library
- Archives & Special Collections, (incl. Rare Book Room), established in 1978;
- Donald W. Craik Engineering Library
- Eckhardt Gramatté Music Library
- E.K. Williams Law Library
- Elizabeth Dafoe Library
- Faculty of Medicine Archives (incl. the Ross Mitchell Rare Book Room)
- Father Harold Drake Library (St. Paul's College)
- Neil John Maclean Health Sciences Library
- Sciences and Technology Library
- St. John's College Library
- William R. Newman Library
- WRHA Virtual Library

== Scholarships and awards ==
The university offers numerous scholarships, bursaries and awards. One of these is the Diane Loranger Memorial Scholarship which can given to a second- or third-year full-time student in the geological sciences who has a minimum GPA of 3.5.

== University governance and administration ==
=== Governance ===
The governance of the University of Manitobais defined by The University of Manitoba Act.

As per the Act, the university is governed through a bicameral system, consisting of two separate governing bodies: the Senate, the academic body responsible for academic matters (including policy); and a Board of Governors, the governing body who exercises exclusive control over financial policy and have formal authority in all other matters.

==== Chancellor ====
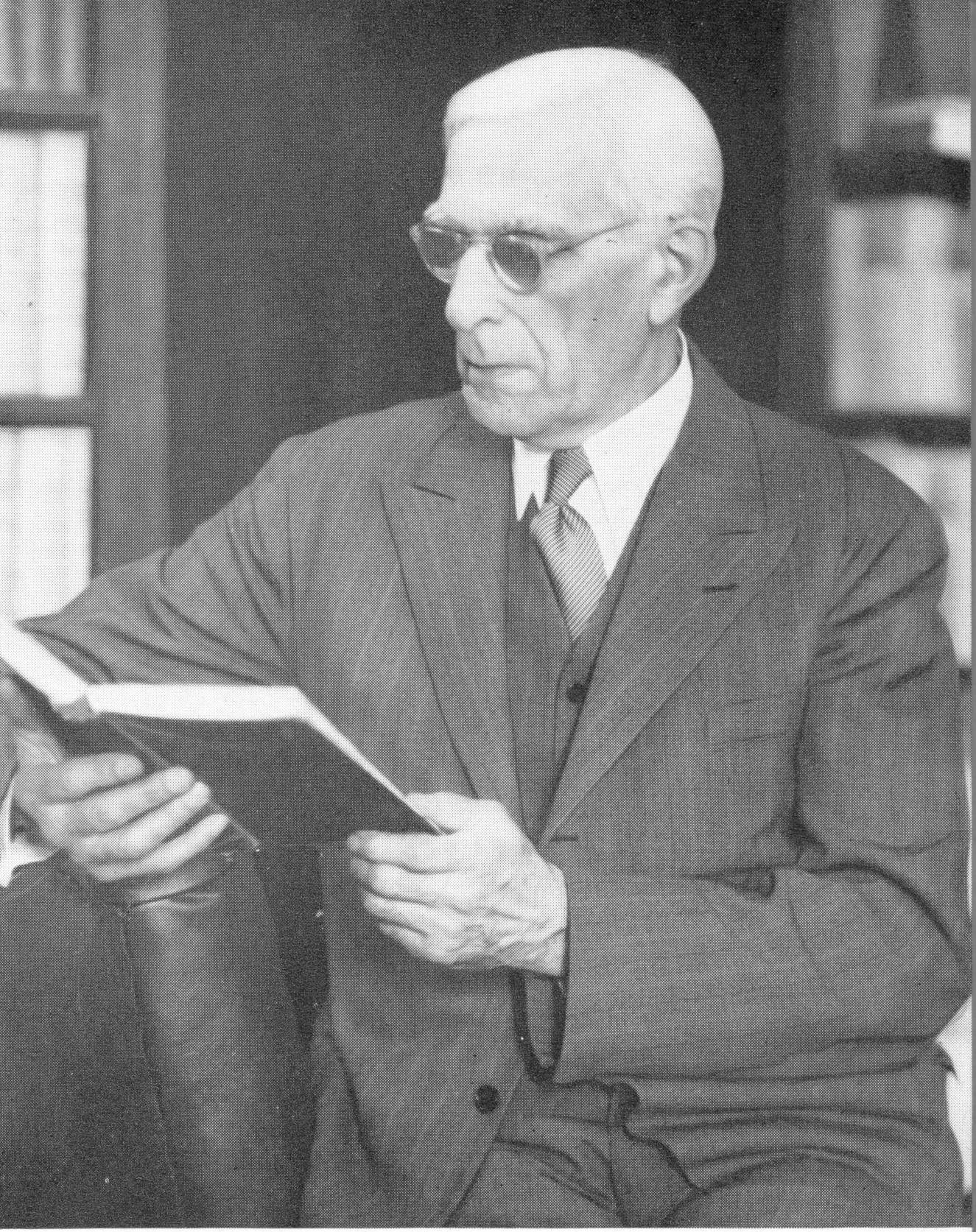
Andrew Knox Dysart served as chancellor from 1944 to 1952.

As the titular head of the university, the chancellor confers all degrees, is a member of both the Board of Governors and the Senate, and acts as a university ambassador when needed.

Since its establishment, the University of Manitoba has had fourteen chancellors in total. However, following the first chancellor, between 1904 and 1908, no successor was appointed by the Government.

- Robert Machray (1887–1904)
- Samuel P. Matheson (1908–1934)
- John W. Dafoe (1934–1944)
- Andrew Knox Dysart (1944–1952)
- Victor Sifton (1952–1959)
- Samuel Freedman (1959–1968)
- Peter D. Curry (1968–1974)
- Richard Spink Bowles (1974–1977)
- Isabel G. Auld (1977–1986)
- Henry E. Duckworth (1986–1992)
- Arthur Mauro (1992–2001)
- Bill Norrie (2001–2010)
- Harvey Secter (2010–2019)
- Anne Mahon (2019 – June 2022)

==== Board of Governors ====
The UM Board of Governors is the governing body of the university, overseeing the administrative and business affairs of the university. It is composed of 23 members and exercises exclusive control over financial policy and have formal authority in all other matters, as well as having the authority to decide on all matters that are not reserved to Senate.

The first Board of Governors was created in 1917 with The University Amendment Act.

It is required to make an annual report to Manitoba's Lieutenant Governor in Council and send it to the Minister of Education. The Board also has the power to appoint president, vice-presidents, deans, the librarian, comptroller, and members of academic staff.

==== Senate ====
Senate, as per the University of Manitoba Act, is the University of Manitoba's senior academic governing body, and has authority over academic matters. The Senate was established in 1936 to replace the University council in order to provide more equal representation between faculties and the affiliated colleges.

=== Administration ===
==== President ====
The President of the University of Manitoba is appointed by the university's Board of Governors and is ex officio Vice-Chancellor. The Office of the President was established as position that provides a link between the two bodies and to perform institutional leadership.

Since its establishment, the university has had 12 presidents in total, including:

- James Alexander MacLean (1913–1934)
- Sidney Earle Smith (1934–1944)
- Henry Percy Armes (1944–1945, acting)
- Albert William Trueman (1945–1948)
- Albert Henry S. Gillson (1948–1954)
- Hugh Hamilton Saunderson (1954–1970)
- Ernest Sirluck (1970–1976)
- Ralph Campbell (1976–1981)
- Arnold Naimark (1981–1996)
- Emőke J. E. Szathmáry (1996–2008)
- David T. Barnard (2008–2020)
- Michael Benarroch (July 1, 2020 – present)

==== Vice presidents and provosts ====
The Provost and vice-president (Academic) is the university's senior academic officer, with responsibility for providing academic vision at the university and leadership in all matters relating to students and academic staff. This office also oversees matters of human resource and immigration related to the University of Manitoba. The current Provost and vice-president (Academic) is Dr. Janice Ristock, who was appointed in 2016.

The Deputy Provost (Academic Planning and Programs) is responsible for the "processes by which new academic programs are introduced, current programs are modified or discontinued, and professional academic programs are assessed by accreditation agencies."

The Vice-Provost (Academic Affairs) is responsible for matters related to academic staff, including hiring, tenure, promotion, discipline, faculty development, and leaves due to research study. The Vice-Provost (Students) looks over matters related to the enhancement of student life and the student experience at the university, as well as student recruitment, retention, and success. This office accordingly has senior leadership responsibility for units within Enrolment Services, the Registrar's Office, Student Engagement and Success, and Student Support.

Other Vice-Provosts include Health Sciences, Teaching and Learning, and Libraries, who is ex officio University Librarian.

UM Vice-presidents
Office	Responsibilities	Incumbent	Reporting units
Vice-president (academic)	Provision of academic vision at the university and leadership in all matters relating to students and academic staff. This office also oversees matters of human resource and immigration related to the University of Manitoba.	Janice Ristock	Vice-Provosts Academic Affairs, Students, Integrated Planning & Academic Programs, and Graduate Education; Director of Immigration Services; Heads of academic units (e.g., faculty Deans)
Vice-president (Administration)	Provision of leadership in all administrative areas, including the financial, business and investment interests of the university; ancillary services; security; fair practices and legal affairs; physical plant and property; risk management; human resources (including labour relations); and information systems and technology services (ISTS).	Naomi Andrew	Ancillary Services; Audit Services; Campus Planning Office; Fair Practices and Legal Affairs; Financial Planning and Budgeting; Financial Services; Human Resources; ISTS; Physical Plant; Risk Management; Smartpark; Sustainability Office; Treasury Services
Vice-president (external)	Securing of public and private support and maintaining the university's presence in the broader community. This includes developing and furthering the university's relationships with the three levels of government; and overseeing communications and public affairs.	John Kearsey	Alumni; Government Relations; Donor Relations; Marketing Communications
Vice-president (Indigenous)	Leading the development and implementation of Indigenous-focused University initiatives, activities, policies, and strategies.	Catherine L. Cook	Indigenous Student Centre; Indigenous Achievement; National Centre for Truth and Reconciliation
Vice-president (research and international)	Supporting the university's areas of research by ensuring that specialized programs, training, funding, and services are accessible to faculty, students, post-doctoral fellows and research technicians.	Digvir S. Jayas	Research Services; Ethics and Compliance; International Centre; Partnerships and Innovation; Mosaic Journal

== Faculty ==
=== Faculty heads ===
University of Manitoba heads of academic units, as of February 2021
Faculty/school or college	Dean/Director
School of Agriculture	
Agricultural and Food Sciences	Martin Scanlon
Faculty of Architecture	Karen Wilson Baptist*
Faculty of Art (est. 1970)	Jeffery Taylor
School of Art	Edward Jurkowski*
Dr. Gerald Niznick College of Dentistry	Anastasia Kelekis-Cholakis
Clayton H. Riddell Faculty of Environment, Earth, and Resources	Mark Hanson*
Faculty of Education	Thomas Falkenberg*
Price Faculty of Engineering	Marcia Friesen
Division of Extended Education	
Faculty of Graduate Studies	Kelley Main*
Rady Faculty of Health Sciences	Brian Postl
Faculty of Kinesiology & Recreation Management	Douglas Brown
Robson Hall – Faculty of Law (est. 1966)	David Asper*
Max Rady College of Medicine	Brian Postl
Marcel A. Desautels Faculty of Music	Edward Jurkowski
College of Nursing	Netha Dyck
College of Pharmacy	Lalitha Raman-Wilms
College of Rehabilitation Sciences	Reginald Urbanowski
Faculty of Science (est. 1970)	Stefi Baum
Faculty of Social Work	Michael Yellow Bird
Faculty of Human Ecology	
I. H. Asper School of Business	Gady Jacoby
University 1	
University College	Jeffery Taylor*
* acting / interim

=== Notable instructors (past and present) ===
- Reg Alcock: former President of the Treasury Board of Prime Minister Paul Martin's Liberal cabinet
- Robert Archambeau: ceramic artist, Governor General's Award winner
- Arthur Henry Reginald Buller: mycologist
- Patricia Churchland and Paul Churchland, former Professors of Philosophy: known for the school of eliminative materialism
- Jean Friesen, former Deputy Premier and Minister of Intergovernmental Affairs of Manitoba Premier Gary Doer's NDP cabinet
- Aniruddha M. Gole: IEEE Fellow
- Frank Hawthorne, Professor of Mineral Sciences
- Larry Hurtado, Professor of Early Christianity and New Testament Languages (1975–1996): founding director of the Institute of the Humanities (1990–1992)
- Guy Maddin, former professor: film director
- Nathan Mendelsohn, Professor of Mathematics
- H. Clare Pentland, Professor of Economics
- Zalman Schachter-Shalomi: pioneer of the Jewish Renewal Movement
- Arthur Schafer: prominent ethicist, director of the Centre for Professional and Applied Ethics
- Carol Shields: Pulitzer Prize-winning author
- Vaclav Smil: energy systems scientist and policy analyst
- Peter St John, 9th Earl of Orkney, former professor of Political Studies, now a senior scholar
- Fernando de Toro, professor and dean
- H. C. Wolfart, Professor of Linguistics
- David G. Barber, Professor of Arctic-System Science

=== Human resources ===
The academic staff are represented by two unions. The professors are represented by the University of Manitoba Faculty Association, who applied to the Manitoba Labor Relations Board for certification as a union on 1 February 1973. (Professors at the Faculty of Dentistry are represented by the University of Manitoba Dental Clinical Staff Association.) Sessional instructors and teaching assistants, on the other hand, are represented by the CUPE Local 3909.

The support staff are divided among many unions. The support staff and the campus security are represented by the AESES, though the support staff at the Faculty of the Engineering are represented by CUPE Local 1482. All outside workers are represented by the CAW Local 3007.

== Alumni and student life ==
=== Notable alumni ===
As of 2010, there have been 96 Rhodes Scholars from the University of Manitoba, more than from any other university in Western Canada.

The administrative office that is officially charged with enhancing student life and the student experience at the University of Manitoba is the Vice-Provost (Students), who has senior leadership responsibility for units within Enrolment Services, the Registrar's Office, Student Engagement and Success, and Student Support.

The university has approximately 27,000 students—24,000 undergraduate and 3,000 graduate. It offers over ninety degrees, including more than sixty at the undergraduate level. Most academic units offer graduate studies programs leading to master's or doctoral degrees.

The school theme song, "Brown and Gold", was recorded by the University of Manitoba Band at CJRC radio station in 1939, and was written by W. J. MacDonald with lyrics written by Charles McCullough.

In 1934, the University of Manitoba Quarterly was replaced by the Alumni Journal. In 1938, the Arts Student Body began publishing the Manitoba Arts Review, a journal of academic articles written primarily by UM students and faculty. In 1947, a new literature and art magazine called Creative Campus made its way under the editorship of Alvin Goldman.

On 15 March 1923, the university's Extension Department launched its University Hour radio program, a series of lectures presented by UM faculty members over an 11-week period. The program was broadcast by the Manitoba Government Telephone System to the Canadian prairie provinces and 8 adjoining American states. In January 1968, the university's TV program A View of Our Own premiered on CBC, and was aimed at students in the 15–23 age bracket.

=== Student groups and representation ===
The students at the university are members of the University of Manitoba Students' Union (UMSU). UMSU represents students at the Board of Governors and Senate, as well as providing programs and support to students. The University of Manitoba Graduate Students' Association (UMGSA) also represents over 3,000 graduate students at the University of Manitoba.

There are several sororities and fraternities on campus.

Students can participate in the University of Manitoba Orchestra.

=== The Manitoban ===
The Manitoban is the official student newspaper at the University of Manitoba. Published for the first time on November 5, 1914, the Toban, as it is called for short, is one of the oldest and largest (by circulation and budget) student newspapers in Canada. The tabloid-sized paper is published monthly during the summer and every Wednesday during the regular Fall-Winter university session. The Manitoban is non-profit and is completely owned and operated by students. During the fall and winter 3,000 copies of The Manitoban are printed on a weekly basis, and distributed extensively on both campuses of the University of Manitoba and throughout Winnipeg. Notable past contributors include Marshall McLuhan, Marcel Dzama, Andrew Coyne, Nahlah Ayed, Graham Spry and Izzy Asper.

== Athletics and recreation ==
The university is represented in U Sports by the Manitoba Bisons.

The university offers recreational programs year-round. Athletic facilities on campus include the Frank Kennedy Centre, Max Bell Centre, the Investor's Group Athletic Centre, and Princess Auto Stadium, which opened in 2013 to replace University Stadium. The first three facilities contain indoor tracks, a swimming pool, work-out facilities, and an international ice hockey rink, as well as basketball, volleyball, squash, and racquetball courts. In addition, the Frank Kennedy Centre also hosts dance, combat and gymnastics rooms, and indoor tennis courts.

The university held its first track meet in the early fall of 1914 with the University of North Dakota on the Winnipeg Exhibition Grounds. With University of Manitoba being victorious, the meet would be thought of as a success and the universities decide to make it an annual event. In 1979, UM student Jan Madden equals the world record in the 300-yard track-and-field event.

== See also ==
- Faculty of Medicine – University of Manitoba
- Robert B. Ferguson Museum of Mineralogy
- List of agricultural universities and colleges
- List of universities in Manitoba
- Higher education in Manitoba
- Education in Canada
