= Catholic studies =

Interdisciplinary academic field

Catholic studies is an interdisciplinary academic field devoted to the study of the teaching, life and culture of the Catholic Church.

A number of Catholic universities started offering programs in Catholic studies as a response to Pope John Paul II's 1990 encyclical Ex corde Ecclesiae. Such universities include Ave Maria University, DePaul University, Georgetown University, Loyola University Chicago, Franciscan University of Steubenville, and the University of Mary. The University of St. Thomas has a specialist Center for Catholic Studies, which was founded in 1992.

== See also ==
- Religious studies
