= University of Manitoba Students' Union =

Coordinates: 49°48′34″N 97°08′04″W

- Institution: University of Manitoba
- Location: Winnipeg, Manitoba
- Established: 1919
- President: Heaven Kaur
- Vice presidents: Cameron J. Provost (Finance & Operations); Grace Elendu (University Affairs); Aiden Peters (External Affairs); Manasa Rajesh (Student Life)
- Members: 27,000+
- Affiliations: CASA
- Colours: Bright Cerulean
- Campus businesses: VW's Social Club; IQ's; Degree's; G.P.A.'s; UMSU Service Centre; UMCycle
- Website: www.umsu.ca

The University of Manitoba Students' Union (UMSU) is the university-wide representative body for undergraduate students at the University of Manitoba, located in Winnipeg, Manitoba. UMSU was established in 1919, replacing the former University of Manitoba Students' Association founded in 1914, and was incorporated by Act of the Manitoba Legislative Assembly effective June 19, 1975.

Its head office is located in UMSU University Centre, a large, Modernist architecture building designed by Canadian architect Isadore (Issie) Coop at UM's Fort Garry Campus that serves as the university's activity hub.

UMSU is funded by mandatory student organization fees, included in tuition fees; upon paying their fees, students become full members of the Students' Union. For the 2020-2021 school year, the mandatory UMSU fee was $136.90 per term, $69.61 of which goes to UMSU itself. The executive and community representatives of the Union are elected during the UMSU General Election.

== Businesses and services ==
The UMSU operates 7 student businesses on campus, all at the University Centre. These businesses include:

- Degree's — a restaurant
- G.P.A.'s Campus Convenience — a convenience store
- VW's Social Club — the campus bar
- IQ’s Cafe & Billiards — a pool hall and coffee shop
- UMCycle — a full-service bike shop
- UMSU Service Centre — an information kiosk that provides information on university-related matters such as registrations, exams, and transit routes/maps, as well as UPass information, poster approvals for University Centre, and a lost-and-found service. It also sells bus passes, other Winnipeg Transit products, and event/social tickets. The Service Centre has replaced the much smaller Answers information booth.

UMSU also operates a number of non-business operations, such as the Gallery of Student Art, which displays art installations created by students and a Food Bank for students.

It also administers a number of scholarships and bursaries, travel grants, as well as providing funding for the student radio station, CJUM-FM (more popularly known as UMFM), and the student newspaper, The Manitoban.

In 2018, UMSU partnered with Nimbus Learning to provide students with a peer tutoring program.

== Governance ==
UMSU has a 5-person elected executive, which includes a president and four vice presidents. In 2016, the reported salary for an executive was $37,700 per executive, including benefits. The President is responsible for the overall operation of UMSU and serves as the official spokesperson. The President also serves on the University Senate and Board of Governors. The four Vice-Presidents are each responsible for a different portfolio:

- Finance and Operations — the Vice President, Finance and Operations (VPFO) for students, including U-Pass, Health and Dental, and Legal services. They also manage UMSU businesses and finances alongside the general manager.
- External Affairs — the Vice President, External Affairs (VPEA) works to build relationships and negotiate with provincial and municipal governments to ensure post-secondary students are consulted on all academic decisions.
- University Affairs - the Vice President, University Affairs (VPUA) oversees internal university-related affairs and serves as a liaison between UM administration and departments. They advocate for the Union’s interests to the Board of Governors, the Senate, and other university committees.
- Student Life — the Vice President, Student Life (VPSL) oversees over 100 UMSU Clubs and 28 Faculty Associations on campus. As the primary liaison between UMSU and its community representatives, they ensure that UMSU consults with and supports marginalized communities on campus.

UMSU Board of Directors is the highest authority in the organization, and is made up of student representatives from each of the University's faculties, schools, student residences, the Inner-City Campus, and five positions for community representatives. Each faculty, school or residence has at least one representative, with some having up to four, depending on student population. The five community representatives represent the following marginalized communities of the student body: women-identifying students, international students, students living with disabilities, LGBTQ students, and Indigenous students.

The executive and community representatives are elected during the UMSU General Election. UMSU is also member of the Canadian Alliance of Student Associations and the Manitoba Alliance of Post-Secondary Students (MAPSS).

There are also various committees that deal with UMSU's governing policies and procedures, including specific areas, such as governance, finance, member services, UPass (a subsidized student bus pass), and the health & dental insurance plan. These committees are composed of a combination of UMSU executives, UMSU Board members, and students-at-large. The UMSU Board is the highest decision making authority and has the power to remove representatives who breach governing policies. Hannah Le was removed for breach of policy during a board vote in 2025 from the Student Life position.

UMSU Executives are invited to serve on the Board of Governors and the Senate of the University of Manitoba each year. In the event of openings on committees and task forces, student representation fulfilled or delegated by the UMSU Executive. In 2020, UMSU President Jelynn Dela Cruz served on the University of Manitoba COVID-19 Response Steering Committee. In the previous year, Dela Cruz served on the Presidents' Task Force for Equity, Diversity, and Inclusion.

UMSU is funded by mandatory student organization fees, included in tuition fees; upon paying their fees, students become full members of the Students' Union. For the 2024-2025 school year, the mandatory UMSU fee was $136.90 per term, $69.61 of which goes to UMSU itself.

== University of Manitoba Students' Union Act ==
The University of Manitoba Students' Union Act
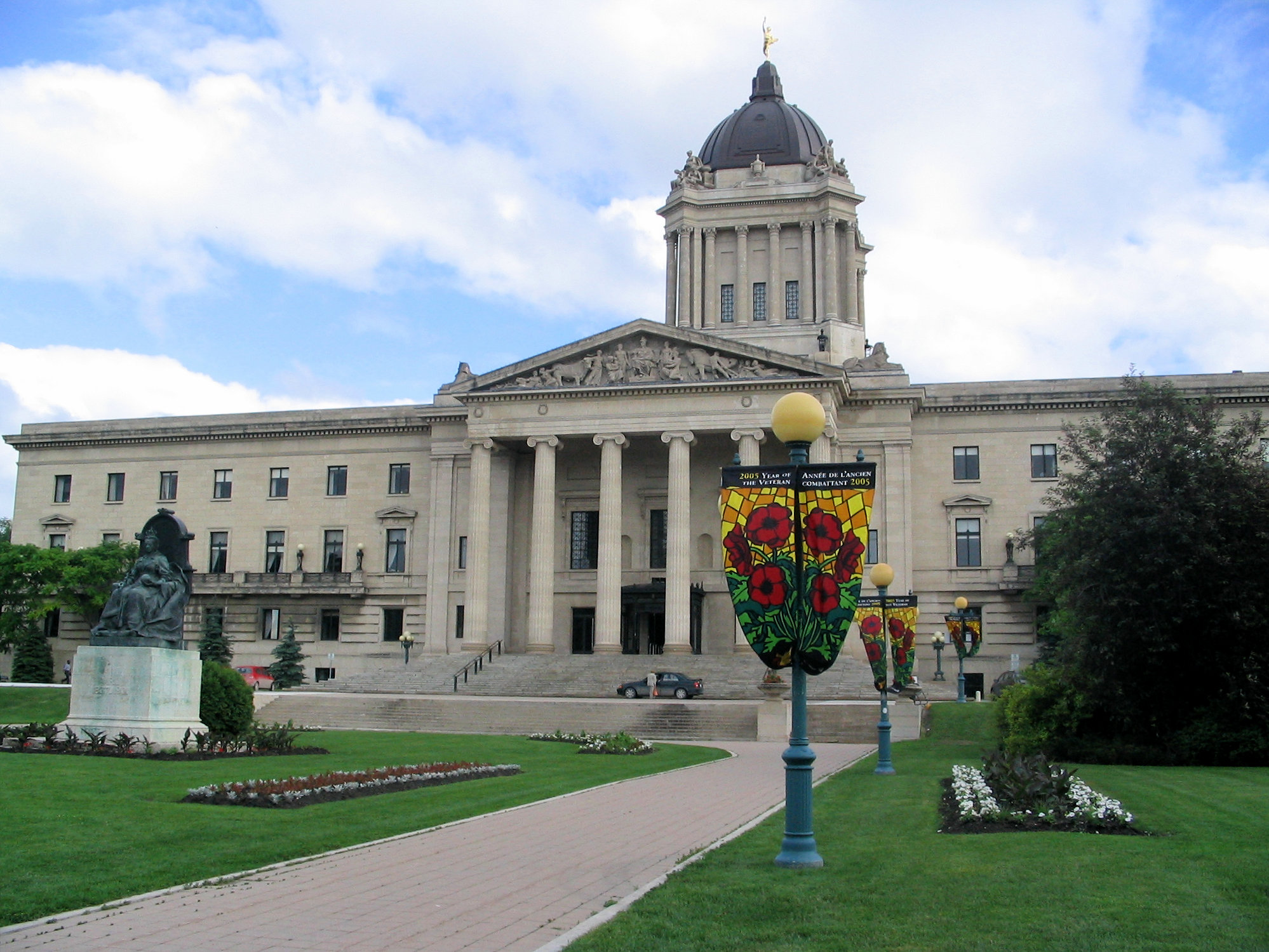

Legislative Assembly of Manitoba
- Citation: R.S.M. 1990, c. 203
- Enacted by: Parliament of Manitoba
- Commenced: 14 November 1990

Amended by
- S.M. 2018, c. 24
- Status: Amended

The University of Manitoba Students' Union Act (French: Loi sur l'Association des étudiants de l'Université du Manitoba) is the Manitoba law that incorporated the University of Manitoba Students' Union, making UMSU the only student government in Canada with its own specific incorporating act. The Corporations Act (Manitoba) does not apply to the corporation. Previously since its founding, UMSU had been an unincorporated body established by a By-law of the University.

The Incorporating Act was proposed and drafted during the presidency of John Perrin (1973-74) with support from UMSU Council, university President Dr. Ernest Sirluck, Chancellor Dr. Peter D. Curry and the U of M Board of Governors. It was finally enacted by the Manitoba Legislative Assembly during the presidency of Robert Setters (1974-75) and then came into effect upon receiving Royal Assent on June 19, 1975 during the presidency of Victoria Lehman (1975-76). The Act was later amended in November 1990 and again in June 2018.

== List of UMSU Presidents ==
| Year | President |
|---|---|
| 2026-2027 | Heaven Kaur |
| 2025-2026 | Prabhnoor Singh |
| 2024-2025 | Divya Sharma |
| 2023-2024 | Tracy Karuhogo |
| 2022-2023 | Jaron Rykiss |
| 2021-2022 | Brendan Scott |
| 2020-2021 | Jelynn Dela Cruz |
| 2018-2020 | Jakob Sanderson |
| 2016-2018 | Tanjit Nagra |
| 2015-2016 | Jeremiah Kopp |
| 2013-2015 | Al Turnbull |
| 2012-2013 | Bilan Arte |
| 2011-2012 | Camilla Tapp |
| 2010-2011 | Heather Laube |
| 2009-2010 | Sid Rashid |
| 2008-2009 | Jonny Sopotiuk |
| 2006-2008 | Garry Sran |
| 2004-2006 | Amanda Aziz |
| 2003-2004 | Shawn Alwis |
| 2001-2003 | Nicholas Louizos |
| 1999-2001 | Steven Fletcher |
| 1998-1999 | Christopher Kozier |
| 1997-1998 | Katherine Kowalchuk |
| 1996-1997 | Trevor Lines |
| 1995-1996 | David Gratzer |
| 1994-1995 | Blessing Rugara |
| 1993-1994 | Cory Pollack |
| 1991-1993 | Paul Kemp |
| 1990-1991 | Adam DiCarlo |
| 1989-1990 | Karen Taraska |
| 1988-1989 | Bob Cielen |
| 1987-1988 | Kevin Janzen |
| 1986-1987 | Mark Rogers |
| 1985-1986 | Jeff Kushner |
| 1984-1985 | Carol Manson |
| 1983-1984 | Michael Young |
| 1982-1983 | Erik Tatarchuk |
| 1981-1982 | Timothy Rigby |
| 1980-1981 | James Egan |
| 1979-1980 | Debra Slade |
| 1978-1979 | Steven Ashton |
| 1977-1978 | Roger Nelson |
| 1976-1977l | James Snidal |
| 1975-1976 | Victoria Lehman |
| 1974-1975 | Robert Setters |
| 1973-1974 | John Perrin |
| 1972-1973 | Bill Balan |
| 1971-1972 | Ray Hamm |
| 1970-1971 | Israel Lyon |
| 1969-1970 | Alan Bodie |
| 1968-1969 | Horace Paterson |
| 1967-1968 | Chris Westdal |
| 1966-1967 | David Sanders |
| 1965-1966 | Winston Dookeran |
| 1964-1965 | Richard Good |
| 1963-1964 | Bryce Doern |
| 1962-1963 | Marshall Rothstein |
| 1961-1962 | William Neville |
| 1960-1961 | Lindley Abdulah |
| 1959-1960 | Jim Foran |
| 1958-1959 | Brian Knapheis |
| 1957-1958 | Charles Anderson |
| 1956-1957 | Julius Koteles |
| 1955-1956 | Miles Pepper |
| 1954-1955 | Scott Wright |
| 1953-1954 | Richard Bocking |
| 1952-1953 | Conrad Wyrzykowski |
| 1951-1952 | William Norrie |
| 1950-1951 | Arthur Mauro |
| 1949-1950 | Bill Appleby |
| 1948-1949 | Fred Bickell |
| 1947-1948 | Peyton Lyon |
| 1946-1947 | Lynn A. K. Watt |
| 1945-1946 | Dave Robertson |
| 1944-1945 | Monte Halparin |
| 1943-1944 | Alberta Hamilton |
| 1942-1943 | Fred Tallman |
| 1941-1942 | John Hamlin |
| 1940-1941 | Richard Hunter |
| 1939-1940 | Roderick Hunter |
| 1938-1939 | William Cave |
| 1937-1938 | Ronald Turner |
| 1936-1937 | John Robinson |
| 1935-1936 | W. Donald Ross |
| 1934-1935 | Hector Craig |
| 1933-1934 | William Bendickson |
| 1932-1933 | John Anderson |
| 1931-1932 | William Lewis Morton |
| 1930-1931 | Charles H. Walton |
| 1929-1930 | Larry A. Adamson |
| 1928-1929 | John A. Crawford |
| 1927-1928 | Edward Holland |
| 1926-1927 | Harry Moss |
| 1925-1926 | Fred Bamford |
| 1924-1925 | Edward Corrigan |
| 1923-1924 | Donald M. Black |
| 1922-1923 | Clifford Dick |
| 1921-1922 | Henry B. Chown |
| 1920-1921 | George H. Lee |
| 1918-1920 | A. A. McCoubrey |
| 1917-1918 | Ralph Maybank |
| 1916-1918 | Urban D. Clark |
| 1915-1916 | William T. Straith |
| 1914-1915 | Roderick K. Finlayson |
