= Academic freedom in Catholic universities =

By definition, Catholic canon law states that "A Catholic school is understood to be one which is under control of the competent ecclesiastical authority or of a public ecclesiastical juridical person, or one which in a written document is acknowledged as Catholic by the ecclesiastical authority" (Can. 803). Although some schools are deemed "Catholic" because of their identity and a great number of students enrolled are Catholics, it is also stipulated in canon law that "no school, even if it is in fact Catholic, may bear the title 'Catholic school' except by the consent of the competent ecclesiastical authority" (Can. 803 §3).

The Dominican Order was "the first order instituted by the Church with an academic mission", founding studia conventualia in every convent of the order, and studia generalia at the early European universities such as the University of Bologna and the University of Paris. In Europe, most universities with medieval history were founded as Catholic. Many of them were rescinded to government authorities in the Modern era. Some, however, remained Catholic, while new ones were established alongside the public ones. The Catholic Church is still the largest non-governmental provider of higher education in the world. Many of them are still internationally competitive. According to the census of the Vatican's Congregation for Catholic Education, the total number of Catholic universities and higher education institutions around the world is 1,358. On the other hand, the United States Conference of Catholic Bishops (USCCB) counts it at 1,861. The Catholic religious order with the highest number of universities around the world today is the Society of Jesus with 114.

Like other private schools, Catholic universities and colleges are generally nondenominational, in that they accept anyone regardless of religious affiliation, nationality, ethnicity, or civil status, provided the admission or enrollment requirements and legal documents are submitted, and rules and regulations are obeyed for a fruitful life on campus. However, non-Catholics, whether Christian or not, do not necessarily participate in otherwise required campus activities, particularly those of a religious nature. The International Federation of Catholic Universities has its origins in collaboration in 1924 between the Università Cattolica del Sacro Cuore in Milan and the Catholic university of Nijmegen in the Netherlands. In 2023, it had 226 members universities in the world.

== Academic freedom in Catholic universities in the USA ==
=== In early American history ===
From the colonial period through the first half of the nineteenth century, college and university professors were regularly selected from the ranks of clergy who were members of the denomination sponsoring the college. The questions of academic freedom that arose during this era of college sectarianism often involved the charge of heresy. These college professors typically cared little about publishing the latest tract on the newest topics in their discipline—assuming they saw themselves as members of a discrete academic discipline, which would have been unusual. Rather, their position was to share what they knew and to serve as role models embodying Christian wisdom and the virtues of the college's sponsoring religious community.

=== In nineteenth and early twentieth century America ===
Following the German university model, major American universities in the late nineteenth and early twentieth centuries were reconfigured as research institutions. No longer content with merely conveying an unchanging body of knowledge from one generation to the next, the modern university was now dedicated to the discovery of new knowledge. Thus, the modern academic was identified by “intellect rather than piety” and marked by productivity in scholarly publication rather than proficiency in the classroom. American academics borrowed two concepts from their German counterparts: Lernfreiheit—the freedom of students to study and take the courses of one's choice—and Lehrfreiheit—the right of the professor to freedom in his teaching, as well as the right to freedom of inquiry, and to share the results of his research with others. In the second half of the twentieth century, a sequence of events led to the blossoming of academic freedom in Catholic universities in the United States.

=== Late twentieth century America ===
In December 1965, St. John's University in Jamaica, New York, abruptly terminated thirty-one professors (most of them teachers of theology or philosophy), without allowing them to finish teaching their fall semester classes, citing their divergence from Church teaching (especially Thomist theology/philosophy). Similarly, in October 1966, four professors of theology and philosophy at the University of Dayton were accused of teaching that was contrary to the magisterium of the Church. These events led to a conference at the University of Notre Dame in April 1966, which resulted in the publication of a book on this topic the following year, titled Academic Freedom and the Catholic University.

The Land O'Lakes Statement of 1967 was an influential manifesto published in Land o' Lakes, Wisconsin, about Catholic higher education in the United States. Inspired by the liberalization represented by the Second Vatican Council (Vatican II, 1962–1965), the statement declared that "To perform its teaching and research functions effectively the Catholic university must have a true autonomy and academic freedom in the face of authority of whatever kind, lay or clerical, external to the academic community itself." In the next few decades hundreds of Catholic schools kept the religious designation but began to operate independently from, and sometimes in opposition to, Catholic teaching.

The Land O'Lakes Statement was drafted by theologian Neil McCluskey at the request of University of Notre Dame president Father Theodore Hesburgh. They helped plan the meetings for the International Federation of Catholic Universities (IFCU), which took place at a University of Notre Dame meeting center in Land O'Lakes, Wisconsin. These meetings culminated with the statement, written by McCluskey, entitled “The Nature of the Contemporary Catholic University,” better known as "The Land O’Lakes Statement". The seminar on the role of Catholic universities was sponsored by University of Notre Dame and was attended by the presidents of the University of Notre Dame, Georgetown, Seton Hall, Boston College, Fordham, St. Louis University, and the Pontifical Catholic University of Puerto Rico. Over a dozen other educators from North American Catholic institutions of higher education were also present. McCluskey was subsequently be named chair of the IFCU meeting at the Lovanium University at Kinshasa in the Democratic Republic of the Congo, which released “The Kinshasa Statement on the Catholic University in the Modern World of the IFCU,” as well as the Congress of Catholic Universities' “The Rome Statement on the Catholic University and the Aggiornamento.”

The final Statement was based on background papers by: George Nauman Shuster, John Tracy Ellis, Michael P. Walsh, S.J., Thomas Ambrogi, S.J., Paul C. Reinert, S.J., Neil G. McCluskey, S.J., William Richardson, S.J., John E. Walsh, C.S.C., Larenzo Roy and Lucien Vachon. Most of the final drafting was done by Robert J. Henle, S.J.

The statement had a pervasive influence on Catholic higher education. Within a few years after 1967, a majority of Catholic colleges and universities in the United States dropped their legal ties to the Catholic Church and turned over their institutions to independent boards of trustees.

The Vatican was alarmed. Pope Paul VI informally warned Jesuits: "in teaching and publications in all form of academic life a provision must be made for complete orthodoxy of teaching, for obedience to the magisterium of the church, for fidelity to the hierarchy and the Holy See." The Land O'Lakes statement was repudiated by Pope John Paul II in 1990 in Ex corde Ecclesiae, the apostolic constitution for Catholic universities. Nevertheless, the Vatican and the bishops were powerless to reverse the change in legal status that made hundreds of schools independent of the Church.

== See also ==
- Ex corde Ecclesiae
- George Nauman Shuster
- Traditionalist Catholicism
- St. John's University strike of 1966-1967
- Land O'Lakes Statement
