= History of Catholic education in the United States =

The history of Catholic education in the United States extends from the early colonial era in Louisiana and Maryland to the parochial school system set up in most parishes in the 19th century, to hundreds of colleges, all down to the present.

== Colonial era ==
There was a small Catholic population in the English colonies, chiefly in Maryland. It supported local schools, often under Jesuit auspices. The Oblate Sisters of Providence, the first Black order of nuns, pioneered in educating Black children in the area, founding St. Frances Academy in 1828 (the first and oldest Black Catholic school in the US).

Much more important were schools of New Orleans, under Spanish and French control until 1803. Well-to-do families sent their children to private Catholic schools run by Ursulines and other orders of nuns. The earliest continually operating school for girls in the United States is Ursuline Academy in New Orleans. It was founded in 1727 and graduated the first female pharmacist and the first woman to contribute a book of literary merit. It was the first free school and first retreat center for ladies, and first classes for female African-American slaves, free women of color, and Native Americans. In the Gulf Coast and Mississippi Valley, Ursulines provided the first center of social welfare in the Mississippi Valley, first boarding school in Louisiana and the first school of music in New Orleans.

Some orders, like the Sisters of the Holy Family (the second order open to Black women), also educated enslaved children and other Black students who otherwise were not allowed to be taught. Specifically, they brought literacy and training in job skills to both free and enslaved black girls, especially through St. Mary's Academy (founded during the Civil War and still operating).

The Catholic education system in place in Arizona, New Mexico and California, which joined the United States in 1848, had largely been dismantled by the Mexican government prior to the Mexican-American War as a result of the Mexican secularization act of 1833.

Catholic universities were also founded during this era, and grew exponentially alongside parochial schools in the late 19th and early- to mid-20th centuries. The universities remained strong even after the parochial schools went into decline during the national religious upheaval of the 70s and 80s, and many continue to this day.

== Parochial era ==
As the nation was mostly Protestant in the 19th century, there was anti-Catholic sentiment related to heavy immigration from Catholic Ireland after the 1840s, and a feeling that Catholic children should be educated in public schools to become American.

The main impetus was fear that exposure to Protestant teachers in the public schools, and Protestant fellow students, would lead to a loss of faith. Protestants reacted by strong opposition to any public funding of parochial schools. The Catholics nevertheless built their elementary schools, parish by parish, using very low paid sisters as teachers.

=== Blaine Amendments ===
In 1875, Republican President Ulysses S. Grant called for a Constitutional amendment that would mandate free public schools and prohibit the use of public funds for "sectarian" schools. He said he feared a future with "patriotism and intelligence on one side and superstition, ambition and greed on the other" which he identified with the Catholic Church. Grant called for public schools that would be "unmixed with atheistic, pagan or sectarian teaching."

A leading republican, Senator James G. Blaine of Maine had proposed such an amendment to the Constitution in 1874. The amendment was turned down by Congress in 1875 and never became federal law. However, it would be used as a model for so-called "Blaine Amendments" incorporated into 34 state constitutions over the next three decades. These amendments prohibited the use of public funds to fund parochial schools and are still in effect today.

=== Colleges and universities ===
Fed increasingly throughout the late 19th and early 20th centuries by the growing number of Catholic school students at the primary and secondary level, Catholic universities have existed since the early years of the United States, starting with Georgetown in 1789.

==== Women's colleges ====
The first Catholic women's college in the US was Saint Mary-of-the-Woods College in Indiana, which was granted a charter for the higher education of women in 1846. Notre Dame of Maryland opened a four-year college in 1895. Another 42 Catholic women's colleges opened by 1925.

==== The ACCU ====
The Association of Catholic Colleges and Universities was founded in 1899.

=== Parochial school growth and structure ===
By 1912 "The greatest religious fact in the United States today", stated Archbishop John Lancaster Spalding, "is the Catholic School system, maintained without any aid by the people who love it". It includes over 20,000 teachers, and over 1,000,000 pupils, represents $100,000,000 worth of property; and costs over $15,000,000 annually. In 1904, Catholic educators formed an organization to coordinate their efforts on a national scale: the Catholic Educational Association which later changed its name to the National Catholic Educational Association.

In the classrooms, the highest priorities were piety, orthodoxy, and strict discipline. Knowledge of the subject matter was a minor concern, and in the late 19th century few of the teachers in parochial schools had gone beyond the 8th grade themselves. The sisters came from numerous denominations, and there was no effort to provide joint teachers training programs. The bishops were indifferent. Finally around 1911, led by the Catholic University in Washington, Catholic colleges began summer institutes to train the sisters in pedagogical techniques. Long past World War II, the Catholic schools were noted for inferior conditions compared to the public schools, and fewer well-trained teachers.

The number of schools and students grew apace with the taxpayer-funded public schools. In 1900, the Church supported 3,500 parochial schools, usually under the control of the local parish.

By 1920, the number of elementary schools had reached 6,551, enrolling 1.8 million pupils taught by 42,000 teachers, the great majority of whom were nuns. Secondary education likewise boomed. In 1900, there were only about 100 Catholic high schools, but by 1920 more than 1,500 were in operation.

In the mid-19th century standard textbooks used in the public schools had a distinctive Protestant tone, with occasional attacks on the Catholic Church in Europe. At the Third Plenary Council of Baltimore (1885) the bishops called for the preparation of acceptable textbooks, and Catholic publishers obliged. Professor Eugene F. Provenzo argues that by the 1890s Catholic educators had selected and adapted non-religious textbook content such that parochial students learned mainstream American political and cultural values without compromising their religious beliefs. The Catholic textbooks presented a generalized nondenominational Christianity and omitted sectarian arguments. There were a few exceptions such as occasional mention of Guardian Angels. Beyond the textbook matter parochial schools copied the new pedagogical techniques being introduced by the mainstream educational system. Apart from catechism classes (where the students learned that Protestants were likely damned to hell), the typical parochial school covered the same material in much the same way as the public schools. Irish Catholic women as nuns made up the parochial teaching staff, Furthermore Irish Cathollc lay women became increasingly prominent in the teaching staff of public schools in the major cities. After 1900 the mainstream textbooks largely dropped an anti-Catholic tone.

==== Supreme Court upholds parochial schools in 1925 ====
In 1922, the voters of Oregon passed an initiative amending Oregon Law Section 5259, the Compulsory Education Act. The law unofficially became known as the Oregon School Law. The citizens' initiative was primarily aimed at eliminating parochial schools, including Catholic schools. The law caused outraged Catholics to organize locally and nationally for the right to send their children to Catholic schools and thereby prevent them from socializing with and possibly marrying Protestants or otherwise assimilating into American culture, . In Pierce v. Society of Sisters (1925), the United States Supreme Court declared the Oregon's Compulsory Education Act unconstitutional in a ruling that has been called "the Magna Carta of the parochial school system."

==== Irish in the Northeast ====
By 1890 the Irish, who controlled the Church in the U.S., had built an extensive network of parishes and parish schools ("parochial schools") across the urban Northeast and Midwest. The Irish and other Catholic ethnic groups looked to parochial schools not only to protect their religion, but to enhance their culture and language.

==== Polish in Chicago ====
Polish Americans arrived in large numbers, 1890–1914, concentrating in industrial and mining districts in the Northeast and Great Lakes areas. They often sent their children to parochial schools and encouraged their young women to become nuns and teachers. In 1932 close to 300,000 Polish Americans were enrolled in over 600 Polish grade schools in the United States. Very few of the Polish Americans who graduated from grade school at the time pursued high school or college.

In Chicago, 35,862 students (60 percent of the Polish population) attended Polish parochial schools in 1920. Nearly every Polish parish in the American Catholic Church had a school, whereas in Italian parishes, it was typically one in ten parishes.

==== Segregation in the South ====
The first African American Catholic schools were established in states with large Catholic populations and a history of slavery, such as Maryland and Louisiana.

Initially, Catholic schools in the South generally followed the pattern of segregation in public schools, sometimes enforced by law. However, most Catholic dioceses began moving ahead of public schools to desegregate. Prior to the desegregation of public schools, St. Louis was the first city to desegregate its Catholic schools in 1947. Following this, Catholic schools followed in Mississippi (1965), Atlanta (1962), Tennessee (1954), and Washington, DC (1948). Due to different integration plans in different locations, some schools decided to desegregate before public schools in their own communities.

=== Peak and decline of parochial schools ===
For more than two generations, enrollment climbed steadily. By the mid-1960s, enrollment in Catholic parochial schools had reached an all-time high of 4.5 million elementary school pupils, with about 1 million students in Catholic high schools. The enrollments steadily declined as Catholics moved to the suburbs, where the children attended public schools.

A major transition took place in the 1970s as most of the teaching nuns left their orders. Many schools closed, others replaced the nuns with much better paid lay teachers and started charging higher tuition.

=== Growth and decline of women's colleges ===
By 1955, there were 116 Catholic colleges for women. Most—but not all—went co-ed, merged, or closed after 1970.

== Modern era ==
=== Primary and secondary education ===
Catholic parochial schools continue to operate, though with fewer students than in previous eras and with predominantly lay faculty.

Many independent Catholic schools also exist, and they—like many religious orders' educational institutions—often operate apart from diocesan oversight.

With minimal access to government funds, and a shortage of rich Catholic philanthropists, the financing of parochial schools was a major problem. The major solution for schools and also for hospitals, and charitable institutions came from sisters who took vows of poverty. Their numbers peaked in 1965 at 181,000, and then began a very sharp decline. Their religious congregations controlled their lives and operated the schools, so that the average salary of teaching sisters in 1953 was $511.

=== Colleges and universities ===
The Land O'Lakes Statement of 1967 was an influential manifesto published by leading Catholic educators headed by Notre Dame President Theodore Hesburgh. It dealt with Catholic higher education in the United States. Inspired by the Second Vatican Council, it charted a course for intellectual freedom and autonomy for Catholic universities. The statement declared that:

To perform its teaching and research functions effectively the Catholic university must have a true autonomy and academic freedom in the face of authority of whatever kind, lay or clerical, external to the academic community itself."

The Statement had a pervasive influence on Catholic higher education. Within a few years a majority of Catholic colleges and universities in the United States dropped their legal ties to the Catholic Church and turned over their institutions to independent boards of trustees.

The Vatican was alarmed. Pope Paul VI informally warned Jesuits: "in teaching and publications in all form of academic life a provision must be made for complete orthodoxy of teaching, for obedience to the magisterium of the church, for fidelity to the hierarchy and the Holy See." The Statement was repudiated by Pope John Paul II in 1990 in Ex corde Ecclesiae, the apostolic constitution for Catholic universities. The Vatican thus sided with the traditionalists who felt the transformation was a disaster for Catholicism. Nevertheless the Vatican and the bishops were powerless to reverse the change in legal status that made a school independent of the Church.

Cafeteria Catholicism is the derogatory term traditionalists use to ridicule Catholics who pick and choose the doctrines they support. Traditionalist groups like the Cardinal Newman Society combat this phenomenon by promoting only the most conservative schools as truly Catholic through its publication The Newman Guide to Choosing a Catholic College.

Vigorous debate in recent decades has focused on how to balance Catholic and academic roles in Catholic universities, with conservatives arguing that bishops should exert more control to guarantee orthodoxy.

== Notable universities ==
=== University of Notre Dame ===
Hesburgh Library at the University of Notre Dame

The University of Notre Dame, founded in northern Indiana in 1842, was modernized in 1919-22 under Rev. James Burns. He brought the school up to national standards by adopting the elective system and starting the abandonment of the traditional scholastic and classical emphasis. By contrast, the Jesuit colleges, bastions of academic conservatism, were reluctant to move to a system of electives. Their graduates were shut out of Harvard Law School for that reason.

The university was still a small operation best known for football when Rev Theodore Hesburgh took over and served as president for 35 years (1952–87). In that time the annual operating budget rose by a factor of 18 from $9.7 million to $176.6 million, and the endowment by a factor of 40 from $9 million to $350 million, and research funding by a factor of 20 from $735,000 to $15 million. Enrollment nearly doubled from 4,979 to 9,600, faculty more than doubled 389 to 950, and degrees awarded annually doubled from 1,212 to 2,500.

=== St. Mary's University, Texas ===
The Society of Mary (the Marianists) had operated a boys' school in San Antonio Texas since 1852. In 1927, as St. Mary's College it began conferring bachelor's degrees. The school became coeducational in 1963. St. Mary's University is now a nationally recognized liberal arts institution with a diverse student population of nearly 4,000 of all faiths and backgrounds. St. Mary's University School of Law, opened in 1927 in the Bexar County Courthouse as the San Antonio School of Law, became a school of St. Mary's University in 1934. It is the oldest Catholic law school in the Southwest.

=== The Catholic University of America ===
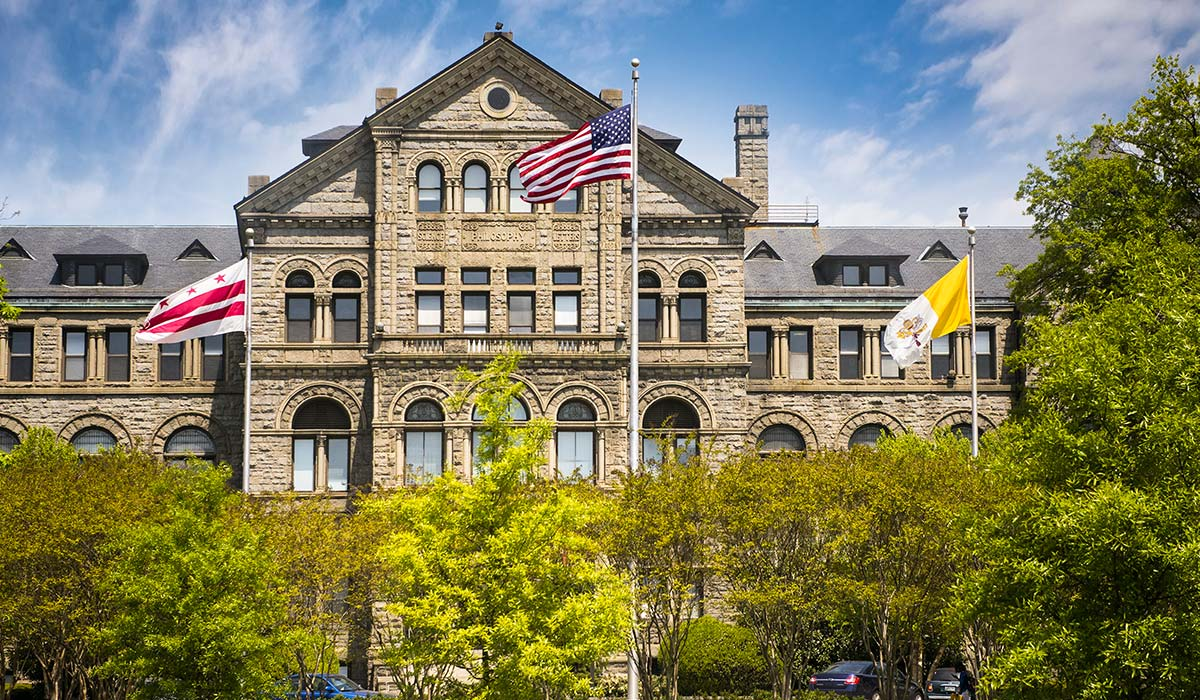
The Catholic University of America

The proposal to create a national Catholic university in America reflected the rising size and influence of the nation's Catholic population and also an ambitious vision of the Church's role in American life during the 19th century.

In 1882 Bishop John Lancaster Spalding went to Rome to obtain Pope Leo XIII's support for the University and persuaded family friend Mary Gwendoline Caldwell to pledge $300,000 to establish it. On March 7, 1889, the Pope issued the encyclical "Magni Nobis", granting the university its charter and establishing its mission as the instruction of Catholicism and human nature together at the graduate level. By developing new leaders and new knowledge, the University would strengthen and enrich Catholicism in the United States. Many of the founders of the CUA held a vision that included both a sense of the Church's special role in United States and also a conviction that scientific and humanistic research, informed by the Faith, would only strengthen the Church. They sought to develop an institution like a national university that would promote the Faith in a context of religious freedom, spiritual pluralism, and intellectual rigor.

When the University first opened for classes in the fall of 1888, the curriculum consisted of lectures in mental and moral philosophy, English literature, the Sacred Scriptures, and the various branches of theology. At the end of the second term, lectures on canon law were added and the first students were graduated in 1889. In 1904, an undergraduate program was added and it quickly established a reputation for excellence.

== See also ==
- Catholic Church in the United States
- History of the Catholic Church in the United States
- Catholic school
  - Seminary
- Catholic schools in the United States
- Catholic sisters and nuns in the United States
- History of education in the United States
  - History of education in New York City
  - History of education in Chicago
  - History of education in California
- Hispanic-Serving Institution, of higher education in USA, enrollment
