= Academic Freedom and the Catholic University =

1967 book edited by Edward Manier

- Title page for Academic Freedom and the Catholic University (1967)
- Editor: Edward Manier; John W. Houck
- Language: English
- Publisher: Fides Publishers
- Publication date: 1967
- Publication place: United States

Academic Freedom and the Catholic University is a book edited by Edward Manier and John W. Houck, published in 1967 by Fides Publishers, a press affiliated with the University of Notre Dame. The volume is based on the proceedings of a conference held at the University of Notre Dame in April 1966.

The book features contributions from John Walsh, David Fellman, John McKenzie, Frederick Crosson, Philip Gleason, Robert Hassenger, John Houck, and Edward Manier.

== Background ==
In the 1960s, Catholic universities in the United States underwent significant changes, with increasing emphasis on academic freedom. These developments were met with resistance from more conservative elements within the Church. Notable incidents included the dismissal of thirty-one faculty members at St. John’s University in New York in December 1965, most of whom taught theology or philosophy and were reportedly terminated for diverging from Church teachings. A similar controversy occurred at the University of Dayton in October 1966, where four professors were accused of teaching content contrary to Church doctrine.

== Conference ==
In response to these events, a conference on academic freedom was convened at the University of Notre Dame on April 22–23, 1966. It was organized by Edward Manier, a professor of philosophy, and John Houck, a professor of law and president of Notre Dame’s chapter of the American Association of University Professors (AAUP). The conference sought to examine the scope and limitations of academic freedom in Catholic institutions of higher education.

Speakers included David Fellman (University of Wisconsin–Madison and national president of the AAUP), John McKenzie (University of Chicago Divinity School), Daniel Callahan (associate editor of Commonweal), and Daniel Greenberg (education writer for Science). Faculty from Notre Dame also participated, including Frederick Crosson, Philip Gleason, and Robert Hassenger. Additional panelists included administrators and faculty such as John Walsh, George Shuster, John Dunne, Edward Manier, and John Houck. The first session was chaired by Charles Allen, professor of metallurgical engineering.

Statements made during the conference reflected a range of perspectives on the role of academic freedom in Catholic education. John Walsh emphasized the necessity of free inquiry for genuine scholarship, while Philip Gleason predicted that demands for academic freedom would continue to grow among faculty and students. John McKenzie advocated for unqualified academic freedom, arguing against censorship as incompatible with the principles of scholarly inquiry.

== Reviews ==
A review of the book highlighted the central question addressed throughout the volume: whether academic freedom is compatible, in principle, with the mission of a church-affiliated university. Particular attention was given to papers by Philip Gleason, Frederick Crosson, and John Walsh, as well as Manier’s introduction. The reviewer noted their contributions as especially significant in articulating the tensions and philosophical underpinnings of academic freedom within Catholic institutions.

== Aftermath ==
Following increased calls for academic freedom in Catholic universities, Pope Paul VI issued an informal admonition to the Jesuits, emphasizing the importance of doctrinal orthodoxy, obedience to the magisterium, and fidelity to Church authority in academic settings.

In 1967, the Land O’Lakes Statement was issued after a separate conference of Catholic educators at a retreat center in Wisconsin. The statement asserted the autonomy of Catholic universities, aligning with themes discussed at Notre Dame. In 1990, Pope John Paul II responded to such developments with the apostolic constitution Ex corde Ecclesiae, which reaffirmed the ecclesial mission of Catholic universities and called for adherence to Church teachings.

Despite Vatican efforts, many Catholic universities in the United States had already established legal independence from the Church by the late 20th century. Ongoing debates have since focused on reconciling academic autonomy with Catholic identity. Organizations such as the Cardinal Newman Society have critiqued the perceived secularization of Catholic institutions and advocated for a return to more traditional models of governance and curriculum.

== See also ==
- Ex corde Ecclesiae
- George Nauman Shuster
- Traditionalist Catholicism
- St. John's University strike of 1966–1967
- Land O'Lakes Statement
- Cardinal Newman Society
