= Hesburgh (disambiguation) =

Theodore Hesburgh (1917–2015) was a former president of the University of Notre Dame.

Hesburgh may also refer to:

- Hesburgh (film), a documentary film
- 1952 Hesburgh, an asteroid
- Hesburgh Award
- Hesburgh Library, a library at Notre Dame

== See also ==
- Father Hesburgh and Father Joyce, a statue
