= The Newman Guide to Choosing a Catholic College =

College evaluation tool by the Cardinal Newman Society

The Newman Guide to Choosing a Catholic College (also termed as The Newman Guide) is a college evaluation tool published annually by the Cardinal Newman Society to assist students in choosing a Catholic college or university. It includes a list of Catholic institutions of higher education selected for their perceived adherence to Catholic teaching. The guide seeks to include schools which comport with the principles of Ex Corde Ecclesiae.

== Description ==
First published in 2007, the Guide identifies a subset of the Catholic colleges in the United States, as well as colleges and universities abroad and online where, in the Society's view, "students can reasonably expect a faithful Catholic education and a campus culture that generally upholds the values taught in their homes and parishes."

The Guide claims "to show students where they can learn and grow in a genuine Catholic environment without the nonsense that has overtaken even some of the most well-known Catholic universities."

The Newman Guide is published both in printed book form and online. The Guide's website includes all of the information for free.

The pre-application process requires schools to review and answer a list of questions that describe the list's basic criteria. Schools are expected to meet the criteria or demonstrate active progress toward meeting the criteria. The list of criteria, available on the Cardinal Newman Society's website, are divided into five categories:

- Institutional Identity and Leadership
- Leadership and Personnel
- Academic Program
- Catholic Formation and Practice
- Student Life

== Recommended colleges (2026) ==
=== United States residential colleges and universities ===
- Ave Maria University (Ave Maria, FL)
- Belmont Abbey College (Belmont, NC)
- Benedictine College (Atchison, KS)
- The Catholic University of America (Washington, DC)
- Christendom College (Front Royal, VA)
- Franciscan University of Steubenville (Steubenville, OH)
- John Paul the Great Catholic University (Escondido, CA)
- Thomas Aquinas College (Santa Paula, CA)
- Thomas More College of Liberal Arts (Merrimack, NH)
- University of Dallas (Irving, TX)
- University of Mary (Bismarck, ND)
- University of St. Thomas (Houston, TX)
- Walsh University (North Canton, OH)
- Wyoming Catholic College (Lander, WY)

=== United States online institutions ===
- Catholic International University (Charles Town, WV)
- Holy Apostles College and Seminary (Cromwell, CT)

=== International online institutions ===
- Campion College (Western Sydney, NSW, Australia)
- Holy Angel University (Angeles City, Philippines)
- International Theological Institute (Schloss Trumau, Austria)
- Our Lady Seat of Wisdom College (Barry's Bay, ON, Canada)
- Pontifical University of Saint Thomas Aquinas (Rome, Italy)

== See also ==
- History of Catholic education in the United States
