= Neil McCluskey =

American gerontologist

Personal details
- Born: Neil Gerard McCluskey; December 15, 1920 Seattle, Washington, U.S.
- Died: May 27, 2008 (aged 87) Fort Lauderdale, Florida, U.S.
- Education: Gonzaga University (BA, MA); Jesuit School of Theology (STL); Columbia University (PhD)

Neil Gerard McCluskey (December 15, 1920 – May 27, 2008) was an American former Jesuit priest who was a prominent voice for Catholic education in the United States in the time of the Second Vatican Council. McCluskey wrote the famous Land O'Lakes Statement, as a member of the committee headed by Fr. Theodore Hesburgh. McCluskey was also the last surviving nephew of Blessed Solanus Casey.

== Biography ==
=== Early life ===
McCluskey was born and raised in Seattle, Washington and attended O'Dea High School. McCluskey's mother, Mary Genevieve Casey McCluskey was the younger sister of Blessed Solanus Casey. McCluskey entered the Society of Jesus in 1938.

He earned a bachelor's degree in English and Philosophy and a master's degree in Philosophy from Gonzaga University in 1944 and 1945, respectively. He earned a licentiate in sacred theology from the Alma College, now the Jesuit School of Theology at Berkeley, in 1952.

=== Career in education ===
In 1955, McCluskey moved to New York City and became an associate editor for America Magazine, the prominent Jesuit Catholic weekly journal, way he would stay until 1960. While working at America, McCluskey earned his Ph.D. in social history in 1957, studying at Columbia Graduate School of Philosophy and Teachers College. It was also in New York City where he wrote his first few books on Catholic Education.

In 1960, McCluskey returned to his alma mater as an education professor. In his time at Gonzaga, he would be named Dean of the School of Education, and later Academic Vice President of Gonzaga. McCluskey also helped develop Gonzaga’s Honors Program and created the Gonzaga in Florence study abroad program. At Gonzaga, McCluskey continued writing books on Catholic education.

In 1966, Father Theodore Hesburgh brought Father McCluskey to the University of Notre Dame as a Visiting Professor of Education. McCluskey was then promoted to Dean-Director of the Notre Dame Institute for Studies in Education and founded the Notre Dame Journal of Education. While at Notre Dame, McCluskey became a member of the Religious Education Association Board of Directors where he would serve for 23 years. As a Jesuit at Notre Dame, a Holy Cross institution, McCluskey played a key role as intermediary between Notre Dame and the prominent Jesuit universities around the country who had had a contentious relationship for many years.

=== The Land O’Lakes statement ===
The most influential of McCluskey’s writings came in 1967 when McCluskey, at the request of Notre Dame president Father Hesburgh, helped plan the meetings for the International Federation of Catholic Universities. These meetings culminated with the statement, written by McCluskey, entitled “The Nature of the Contemporary Catholic University,” better known as “The Land O’Lakes Statement.” The seminar, on the role of Catholic universities, sponsored by University of Notre Dame and hosted at Notre Dame's Land O'Lakes property, was attended by the presidents of the University of Notre Dame, Georgetown, Seton Hall, Boston College, Fordham, St. Louis University, and the Pontifical Catholic University of Puerto Rico. Over a dozen other educators from North American Catholic institutions of higher education were also present. McCluskey would subsequently be named chair of the IFCU meeting at the Lovanium University at Kinshasa in the Democratic Republic of the Congo, which would release “The Kinshasa Statement on the Catholic University in the Modern World of the IFCU,” as well as the Congress of Catholic Universities' “The Rome Statement on the Catholic University and the Aggiornamento.”

While at Notre Dame, McCluskey was also a member of the Board of Trustees at the neighboring Saint Mary's College. At the time the University of Notre Dame was preparing to start co-education and McCluskey was tasked with handling the merger of Saint Mary’s College and Notre Dame. The negotiations for the merger were ended, the merger never occurred, and McCluskey resigned his position on the Board of Trustees.

=== Later life ===
After leaving Notre Dame, McCluskey moved back to New York City. In 1975, he left the priesthood and married. He spent much of the rest of his life teaching and writing about aging and gerontological studies. McCluskey died in Fort Lauderdale, Florida on May 27, 2008.

== Selected published works ==
=== Books ===
- McCluskey, N. G. & Borgatta, E. F. (1981). Aging and retirement: Prospects, planning and policy. Thousand Oaks, CA: Sage Publications.
- Borgatta, E. F. & McCluskey, N.G. (1980). Aging and society: Current research and policy perspectives. Thousand Oaks, CA: Sage Publications.
- McCluskey, N. G. (1970). The Catholic university: A modern appraisal. Notre Dame, IN: University of Notre Dame Press.
- foreword by Theodore Hesburgh; Catholic Education faces its future. Garden City, NY: Doubleday & Co., Inc. 1968.
- McCluskey, N. G. (1964). Catholic Education in America: A documentary history: Classics in education. New York: Teacher's College, Columbia University, Bureau of Publications.
- McCluskey, N. G. (1962). Catholic Viewpoint on education. Garden City, NY: Doubleday & Co.
- McCluskey, N. G. (1959). Catholic Viewpoint on education. Garden City, NY: Image Books.
- McCluskey, N. G. (1958). Public Schools and Moral Education. New York: Columbia University Press.

== See also ==
- Land O'Lakes Statement
