= Our Lady Seat of Wisdom College =

Coordinates: 45.4824°N 77.6811°W

- Former name: Our Lady Seat of Wisdom Academy
- Motto: Veritas Vos Liberabit
- Motto in English: The truth will set you free
- Type: Private
- Established: 2000
- Religious affiliation: Roman Catholic
- President: Dr. Patrick Craine
- Undergraduates: 100 full-time
- Location: Barry's Bay, Ontario, Canada
- Campus: Rural
- Colours: Blue and Gold
- Website: www.seatofwisdom.ca

Our Lady Seat of Wisdom College (SWC), formerly Our Lady Seat of Wisdom Academy, is a private Catholic liberal arts college located in Barry's Bay, Ontario, Canada. The college offers a four-year Bachelor of Arts program with majors in Classical and Early Christian Studies, History, and Literature. SWC is known for its traditional Catholic teaching and values, and is recommended by the Newman Guide for its strong Catholic culture.

== History ==
Our Lady Seat of Wisdom grew out of a 1999 study group called "Mater Ecclesiae" in Combermere, Ontario, under the directorship of John Paul Meenan. The centre sought to provide affordable Catholic education to students wishing to advance their studies after high school. In the early days, studies took place in living rooms, basements, hay lofts, and other areas hosted by local families, while teaching and tuition were free.

In 2000, the Roman Catholic Diocese of Pembroke donated the former grounds of St. Joseph's Convent for use by members of the study centre. In September 2000, Our Lady Seat of Wisdom Academy was established, and the school had its first official academic year which saw nine students and several teachers. In 2003, the academy added a second year of study to their program, and a third year in 2004.

Our Lady Seat of Wisdom was approved by the province of Ontario to offer a three-year Bachelor of Catholic Studies degree in 2017, after which it became known as Our Lady Seat of Wisdom College.

In September 2017, there were 136 students and a student-faculty ratio of 13:1.

SWC has been featured in The Newman Guide to Choosing a Catholic College as one of the institutions around the world listed as faithfully Catholic colleges.

== Academic profile ==
=== Liberal arts education ===
The courses at Our Lady Seat of Wisdom are centered on Catholic liberal arts, faithful to the Magisterium of the Church. With liberal arts education underlying the academics, SWC has a core curriculum that encompasses studies in theology, Philosophy, History, Literature, Languages, Fine Arts, Sacred Music, and Natural and Social Sciences.

=== Programs and degree-granting status ===
On May 1, 2017, Our Lady Seat of Wisdom received degree-granting status and the title of "College" in the province of Ontario. OLSW was approved by the Ontario Ministry of Advanced Education and Skills Development (now the Ministry of Colleges and Universities) to grant a Bachelor of Catholic Studies degree. The first students received this degree at the end of the 2016–2017 academic year. The college also grants various Certificates of Christian Humanities. SWC focuses on a core liberal arts curriculum.

In 2024-2025 school year student were eligible to receive four year Bachelor degrees in multiple disciplines.

== Student life ==
Students live in single-sex, home-style residences. Each residence houses from 5 to 16 students and is led by members of the Student Leadership Team, upper-year students who facilitate the smooth functioning of the residences. Residences are named after a specific saint or Marian title. Students form community through prayer, house nights once per month, and chores, among other activities.

Students have the opportunity to take part in hikes, sports, musical performances, field trips, community prayer, choir practices, dances, special guest lectures, campus clubs and more. Official clubs include the Don Bosco Drama Club, the Paul Sanders and Janine Lieu Pro-Life Club, the John-David Filmmaking Club, the Tolkien Club, and Ecclesiastical Schola.

SWC's chaplain offers Mass weekly, as well as private spiritual direction and confession to students.

== Accreditation ==
Our Lady Seat of Wisdom College is authorized by the province of Ontario to offer a Bachelor of Catholic Studies degree, as well as a four-year Bachelor of Arts with majors in History; Literature; and Classical and Early Christian Studies.
