= Father Hesburgh and Father Joyce =

Statue at the University of Notre Dame

Fathers Theodore Hesburgh and Edmund Joyce
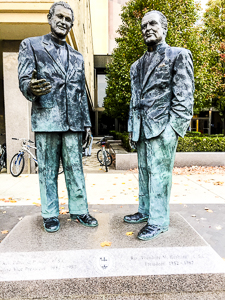
- Artist: Lou Cella
- Year: 2005
- Type: Bronze
- Dimensions: 220 cm × 74 cm × 130 cm (88 in × 29 in × 50 in); 50x29x88w
- Location: University of Notre Dame, Notre Dame, Indiana, United States; 41°42′06.9″N 86°14′03.3″W
- Owner: University of Notre Dame

Fathers Theodore Hesburgh and Edmund Joyce is an outdoor statue on the University of Notre Dame campus. Located on the South side of the Hesburgh Library facing the reflecting pool, the sculpture was designed and built by artist Lou Cella, a member of the Rotblatt-Amrany Fine Art Studio, and is currently owned by the University of Notre Dame.

== Description ==
The larger than life bronze statue of Fathers Theodore Hesburgh and Edmund Joyce welcomes each and every visitor entering the south side of the Hesburgh Library. Father Joyce (left) stands 7-feet-4-inches in height, and Father Hesburgh (right) stands 7 ft tall. Hesburgh can be seen staring off into the distance, a trait that Cella remembered as one of the deciding factors for his maquette being chosen out of many other submissions to create the sculpture. “When I try to capture personalities, I focus on the eyes,” Cella stated in an interview about the piece.

Two elements personalizing the figures are the specific clerical collar worn by Father Joyce and a small dove pin on Father Hesburgh's lapel. Cella's uncles, current priests at Notre Dame, informed him of Joyce's “fashion-forward” collar and also mentioned that Father Hesburgh would never leave his campus home without his dove pin.

In choosing the exact facial expressions for the statues after being commissioned, Cella notes, “There was a specific photo of Father Hesburgh in particular that they liked of him standing outside of Corby Hall, pretty much in the pose that you see. There was a look on his face that they liked.” The time period represented in the statue was circa 1975. Cella remembers during the installation that fairly new onlookers from the library who didn't know Hesburgh during this time period would “looked at it and ask ‘that's Father Ted?’” whereas more senior members of the library staff or faculty who knew him better said it “totally looked like him.”

== Historical information ==
Father Theodore Hesburgh and Father Edmund Joyce were president and executive vice president of the University of Notre Dame from 1952 to 1987. The sculpture aimed to commemorate not only the incredible lives of each of the individuals but also their lifelong friendship. Shortly after their retirement, the two priests took an unforgettable vacation together, in which Father Hesburgh referenced in his 1992 book “Travels with Ted & Ned.”

Joyce, an essential figure to the National Collegiate Athletic Association and whose namesake is Notre Dame's major athletic facility, the Edmund P. Joyce Center, died at the age of 87 in May 2004. Joyce's work during his life involved forming the College Football Association and serving as treasurer and working with issues involving the educational integrity of college athletes. Joyce received the Distinguished American Award from the National Football Foundation in 1977. After Joyce served 35 years as chief financial officer, Father Hesburgh fittingly gave his eulogy at his Christian burial mass.

Father Theodore Hesburgh, a highly revered figure on Notre Dame's campus and around the world, had major impacts on national and international affairs throughout his life. His work has touched a myriad of social sectors from peaceful uses of atomic energy to treatment of Vietnam offenders to Third World development, immigration reform, and much more. Major facilitator of justice, Hesburgh was appointed a charter member of the U.S. Commission on Civil Rights in 1957 where he chaired from 1969 to 1972.

=== Location history ===
The sculpture is located on the South side of the Hesburgh Library facing the reflecting pool. The Hesburgh Library, built in 1963 and named after Father Hesburgh in 1987, housed Father Hesburgh's office during his service to the university. Located on the 13th floor, Hesburgh's office faced the Main Quad, and remains locked and preserved to this day. For more information, see external links below.

=== Acquisition ===
After sculptor Lou Cella constructed the piece in his studio in Highwood, IL, his team from the Rotblatt studio helped to install the sculpture in its current location. The exact commission Cella received for this particular project is unknown, but publicly accessible commission values have ranged from $62,000 for a bronze sculpture of Orville Redenbacher to over $100, 000 for his bronze depiction of Chicago White Sox player Paul Konerko.

The statue was formally presented to Notre Dame on Saturday, Oct. 22, 2005 at 9:45 a.m before a home football game on behalf of the university's Class of 1953. Cella and his uncle both attended the ceremony. The Class of 1953 was the first class to graduate under the leadership of both Father Hesburgh and Father Joyce, and the sculpture was presented at their 50th reunion. Notre Dame's president, Rev. John Jenkins, gave a blessing at the ceremony, accompanied by a speech from a representative of the Class of 1953. Members of the class were integral in the process of judging the competition to choose the sculptor of the project.

The competition was instigated after a 3rd party outside the commission wanted to do something to commemorate the two figures and approached the board. The competition held two rounds because in the initial round the committee was not happy with any of the submission ideas, so they re-initiated the competition with a more specific directive. In this second round, they asked for submissions of 2-feet tall miniatures - known as maquettes - cast in resin and painted over to simulate bronze.

== Artist ==
Lou Cella, graduate of Illinois State University ‘85, dabbled in graphic design after college and then decided to move into three-dimensional art, and enrolled in classes at the Rotblatt-Amrany Fine Art Studio, where he then began working after completing his classes.

Cella has been a lifelong Notre Dame fan and often visited his brother and two resident priest uncles on campus (Father James Banas and Reverend Leonard Banas). Cella himself said, “When you have two people who are intertwined with the ND community, you get to know a lot about the campus. I had a personal connection to the school, and even though I didn't attend Notre Dame, it's kind of in my DNA.”

Cella was able to meet Father Hesburgh on many occasions before making the statue, saying, “We would go to the games and then go to dinner at Corby Hall with our uncles and Father Hes would come.” Cella remembered that during the time he built the sculpture, “it was almost impossible to find someone who didn't have profound love for Father Hesburgh and who he didn't mean something to.”

== See also ==
- Hesburgh Library
- University of Notre Dame
- Theodore Hesburgh
