= Land O'Lakes Statement =

1967 manifesto about Catholic higher education in the U.S.

The Land O'Lakes Statement, officially The Idea of the Catholic University, was an influential 1967 position paper published in Land o' Lakes, Wisconsin, about Catholic higher education in the United States. Inspired by the liberalization represented by the Second Vatican Council (1962–1965), the statement declared that "To perform its teaching and research functions effectively the Catholic university must have a true autonomy and academic freedom in the face of authority of whatever kind, lay or clerical, external to the academic community itself." In the next few decades hundreds of Catholic schools kept the religious designation but began to operate independently from, and sometimes in opposition to, Catholic teaching.

== Background ==
Several significant events served as background for this statement. In December 1965, St. John's University in Jamaica, New York, abruptly terminated thirty-one professors, most of them teachers of theology or philosophy, without allowing them to finish teaching their fall semester classes, citing their divergence from Church teaching, especially Thomist theology and philosophy. Similarly, in October 1966, four professors of theology and philosophy at the University of Dayton were accused of teaching that was contrary to the magisterium of the Church. A conference on the topic of "Academic Freedom and the Catholic University," organized by Edward Manier and John Houck, took place at the University of Notre Dame in April 1966, leading to a publication of a book on this topic the following year.

== Drafting ==
The Land O'Lakes Statement was drafted by theologian Father Neil McCluskey at the request of University of Notre Dame president Father Theodore Hesburgh. They helped plan the meetings for the International Federation of Catholic Universities (IFCU), which took place at a University of Notre Dame meeting center in Land O'Lakes, Wisconsin. These meetings culminated with the statement, written by McCluskey, entitled “The Nature of the Contemporary Catholic University,” better known as "The Land O’Lakes Statement." The seminar on the role of Catholic universities was sponsored by University of Notre Dame and was attended by the presidents of the University of Notre Dame, Georgetown, Seton Hall, Boston College, Fordham, St. Louis University, and the Pontifical Catholic University of Puerto Rico. Over a dozen other educators from North American Catholic institutions of higher education were also present. McCluskey was subsequently named chair of the IFCU meeting at the Lovanium University at Kinshasa in the Democratic Republic of the Congo, which released “The Kinshasa Statement on the Catholic University in the Modern World of the IFCU,” as well as the Congress of Catholic Universities' “The Rome Statement on the Catholic University and the Aggiornamento.”

The final Statement was based on background papers by: George Nauman Shuster, John Tracy Ellis, Michael P. Walsh, S.J., Thomas Ambrogi, S.J., Paul C. Reinert, S.J., Neil G. McCluskey, S.J., William Richardson, S.J., John E. Walsh, C.S.C., Larenzo Roy and Lucien Vachon. Most of the final drafting was done by Robert J. Henle, S.J.

== Impact and controversy ==
The statement has had a wide-reaching influence on Catholic higher education. Within a few years after 1967, a majority of Catholic colleges and universities in the United States dropped their legal ties to the Catholic Church and turned over their institutions to independent boards of trustees.

The Vatican was alarmed. Pope Paul VI informally warned Jesuits: "in teaching and publications in all form of academic life a provision must be made for complete orthodoxy of teaching, for obedience to the magisterium of the church, for fidelity to the hierarchy and the Holy See." Pope John Paul II's 1990 apostolic constitution Ex corde Ecclesiae, a document which aimed to draw the Church and its educational institutions closer to one another, was understood by many to be a rebuttal to the Land o'Lakes statement. Despite concern over the decades following the statement's release, the Vatican and the bishops were unable to reverse the change in legal status which made hundreds of schools independent of the Church.

== See also ==
- Ex corde Ecclesiae
- George Nauman Shuster
- Traditionalist Catholicism
- St. John's University strike of 1966-1967
- Academic freedom in Catholic universities
