= John J. Paris, S.J. =

John J. Paris, S.J. is the current Michael P. Walsh Professor of Bioethics at Boston College.

== Biography ==
He received a B.S in history from Boston College in 1959, an A.M. in Government and Education from Harvard University in 1969, a Ph.L. in Philosophy from Weston College in 1967, and a B.D. in Theology from Boston College in 1967. He then received both an M. A. and a Ph.D. (1972) in Social Ethics from the University of Southern California. His doctoral thesis was "Toward an understanding of the Supreme Court's approach to religion in conscientious objector cases" Before coming to the Boston College faculty, he held the position of Professor of Religious Studies at the College of the Holy Cross, Worcester, MA from 1972 to 1990. While teaching at Holy Cross and then Boston college he held the position of Adjunct Professor of Medicine at the University of Massachusetts Medical School from 1982 to 1994, and Clinical Professor of Family Medicine and Community Health at Tufts University School of Medicine (1985-1998).

== Professional career ==
His academic background extends to history, government, education, and philosophy. With over 150 publications in the areas of law, medicine, and ethics, Paris has made an extensive impact in the field of medical ethics. He has participated in over 80 court hearings including the notable Brophy vs New England Sinai Hospital, which commented on the right of patients in a persistent vegetative state to refuse medical care. Additionally, he has been consulted by over 500 organizations to comment on the ethics of medical treatments, procedures, and practices.
