= Hesburgh Award =

Award for excellence in academic administration

The Hesburgh Award is an award, established in 1993, given by TIAA-CREF to a university that has exceptional faculty development programs. It is named for Theodore M. Hesburgh, former president of the University of Notre Dame and former member of the TIAA and CREF Boards of Overseers.

== List of Award Winners ==
- 1999 Georgia Institute of Technology
- 2000 Ferris State University
- 2001 Utah Valley State College
- 2002 Babson College
- 2003 Indiana University Bloomington
- 2004 Barnard College
- 2005 Wagner College
- 2006 University of Colorado at Boulder
- 2007 University of Wyoming
- 2008 Baruch College
- 2010 University System of Maryland
- 2011 University of Maryland, Baltimore County
- 2012 California State University System and Miami Dade College
- 2013 University of Texas at El Paso
