= Cardinal Newman Society =

American Catholic educational organization

The Cardinal Newman Society is an American 501(c)(3) nonprofit organization founded in 1993 whose stated purpose is to promote and defend faithful Catholic education. The organization is guided by Cardinal John Henry Newman's The Idea of a University and Pope John Paul II's 1990 Apostolic Constitution Ex Corde Ecclesiae. The organization publishes The Newman Guide to Choosing a Catholic College.

== Founding ==
The society was founded in 1993 by Fordham University alumnus Patrick Reilly. After decisions by Fordham to recognize pro-choice and gay student clubs and create a counseling helpline which referred pregnant students to an abortion provider, Reilly used his position as editor of the school paper to express his opinions in defense of Catholic teaching on sexuality and abortion. Reilly launched the society with the help of other recent Catholic university graduates.

The society's leadership included prominent political commentator and diplomat L. Brent Bozell III, who suggested use of direct mail marketing to invigorate the organization at a time when it existed "primarily as letterhead." According to Reilly, “It took a while, but there was such a need, more and more, to engage students and working with alumni and working with faculty and as we went on, it became clear that they were all looking for some kind of national voice to express the concerns that very many faithful Catholics had about the state of Catholic education.”

In 1996 the United States Conference of Catholic Bishops invited the Newman Society to advise on guidelines to implement Ex corde Ecclesiae. The bishops approved final guidelines in 1999, consistent with the recommendations of the Newman Society. In 2006, the Bishops' and Presidents' Committee of the USCCB sent a letter to the ten bishops listed as "ecclesiastical advisers" to the Cardinal Newman Society, calling the organization "often aggressive, inaccurate, or lacking in balance" and its methods "often objectionable in tone and substance." It suggested that the bishops resign from the advisory board. The board was subsequently disbanded.

According to journalist Joe Feuerherd, "[A]s Cardinal Newman rolls over in his recently relocated grave, Reilly uses the cardinal’s good name to promote the idea of university as Catholic madrassa...Reilly searches for hot button issues on Catholic campuses... – that will energize their base of donors and activists. Then they highlight these offenses on the Web and through direct mail to generate revenue." The sentiment is echoed by John J. Paris, S.J., professor of bioethics at Boston College and one of the targets of the Society, "I think he is a fraud, a charlatan, and a snake-oil salesman" and of the Society, that its purpose is "whipping up right-wing types to open their checkbooks."

== Activities ==
Through the Higher Education program the Society seeks to work directly with college presidents and administrators of various levels to promote best practices and strengthen Catholic identity and education. However, the Association of Jesuit Colleges and Universities charges that the group eschews dialogue and "chooses to criticize and make distorted claims against Catholic colleges, oftentimes maligning them in the process". The Society has published research into the effects of implementing a faithful Catholic mission as well as various aspects of Student Life on campus including dorm visitation policies and human sexuality policies.

Through the K-12 Programs the K-12, Society provides resources on hiring for mission, setting clear expectations for teachers in Catholic schools, and encouraging primary and secondary schools to strengthen their Catholic identity.

In response to the promulgation of Common Core State Standards, the Newman Society introduced the Catholic is Our Core program exploring the implication of the standards for Catholic schools and their students. Through the Catholic is Our Core program, the Society maintains that the core of a Catholic K-12 education is a strong Catholic identity, and takes a negative view of the Common Core concept which it sees as unnecessary and falling "...short of the Holy See's vision for Catholic education".,

They also issue numerous press releases publicizing departures from orthodoxy or tolerance of ideas, activities, and presentations that are not in accordance with Catholic teaching at Catholic colleges and universities. The Society claims credit for the 2011 resignation of Chicago business executive and University of Notre Dame board member, Roxanne Martino, who had donated to EMILY's List and the Chicago Foundation for Women, an organization that addresses domestic violence and economic equality, but has ties to Planned Parenthood. Both university president Rev. John Jenkins and chairman of the university's board of trustees, Richard C. Notebaert, said Martino didn't realize any of the organizations she supported also promoted abortion rights.

In 2012 the Newman Society assumed management of the Catholic High School Honor Roll program from the Acton Institute. The Honor Roll recognizes Catholic high schools across America that have demonstrated excellence in Catholic identity and academics as defined in the Societies publication Principles of Catholic Identity in Education. On the 2014 Honor Roll, seventy-one secondary schools were named Schools of Excellence. In addition to a Certificate of Recognition, the program is a way for recognized schools to increase positive publicity, visibility, enrollment, and donations. There is a $140 application fee.

The society sponsors conferences and speakers as well as producing Our Catholic Mission and The Renewal Report, the society's newsletters. Its website indicates an emphasis on "researching activities both on campus and in the classroom." The Newman Society launched Center for the Advancement of Catholic Higher Education in 2008 to promote best practices in Catholic higher education. The center has published research on visitation policies at Catholic universities, Catholic colleges whose websites referred students to pro-abortion organizations and clinics, and sexuality policies on campuses of Catholic universities.

First published in 2007, The Newman Guide to Choosing a Catholic College purports "to show students where they can learn and grow in a genuine Catholic environment without the nonsense that has overtaken even some of the most well-known Catholic universities." The 2014 Guide identified 20 of the 197 Catholic colleges in the United States, as well as seven colleges and universities abroad and online where, in their view, "students can reasonably expect a faithful Catholic education and a campus culture that generally upholds the values taught in their homes and parishes." Not all recommended colleges were currently accredited, and the criteria for recommendation includes whether or not the Tridentine Mass is offered on campus, although a majority of recommended colleges do not offer a weekly Tridentine Mass. According to Fr. Robert W. Cook, president of one of the smallest (124 students) and newest Catholic colleges in the country, Wyoming Catholic College in Lander, founded in 2007, "Being listed in The Newman Guide has been extremely helpful in student recruitment and in finding solid and generous benefactors".

The organization has partnered with the Heritage Foundation to sponsor such events as their joint forum on academic freedom. It has a large presence on the Web, issuing "Catholic Higher Education Alerts" to publicize not only what it considers scandalous programming at universities, but in opposition to the ACA contraceptive mandate, judges it deems activist or with whom it disagrees, and what it perceives as "liberal bias" more generally.

The organization has stated that "a Catholic bishop contacted Patrick Reilly to discuss how he could put the screws to a wayward Catholic college in his diocese, including ways of encouraging the removal of dissident theology faculty." Reilly declined to identify the bishop, citing confidentiality.

=== Speakers ===
The Society monitors speakers at Catholic universities, and provides a mechanism for online reporting of what it believes to be scandalous commencement speakers and honorees. In 2009, the Society criticized the University of Notre Dame for inviting President Barack Obama to receive an honorary doctorate of law and deliver the commencement speech due to his pro-choice position and record in support of abortion. Nevertheless, the University of Notre Dame stood by its invitation to the President.

The organization also deplored a commencement address given at Notre Dame de Namur University by Sr. Helen Prejean, a nun opposed to capital punishment and author of Dead Man Walking, claiming the Josephite nun "is out-of-line with church teaching on, of all issues, capital punishment." The organization faulted Prejean's critique of a "loophole" in the Church's teaching which permits capital punishment under limited circumstances.

In 2011, due to complaints raised by the Cardinal Newman Society, Saint Francis University in Loretto, Pennsylvania cancelled a lecture by journalist Ellen Goodman on civility in public discourse because of her views regarding abortion.

In the spring of 2012, the Cardinal Newman Society listed 12 Catholic universities whose commencement speakers were considered objectionable because of their support for abortion or gay rights. Among the speakers was Kathleen Sebelius, secretary of Health and Human Services, who was invited to speak at Georgetown University. The Society presented a 26,000-signature petition that called the choice of Sebelius "insulting to faithful Catholics and their bishops who are engaged in the fight for religious liberty and against abortion." Sebelius personally supports abortion and has upheld the mandate in the Affordable Care Act requiring all institutions, including Catholic colleges, to provide birth control coverage. The Archdiocese of Washington sent a letter of rebuke to Georgetown's president on the matter.

The Newman Society reports on its website that in 2011 it caused bishops to intervene in homosexual conferences at Fordham and Fairfield University.

The Society has on several occasions criticized colleges for awarding Sister Elizabeth Johnson honorary degrees. Reilly said of her, "This is a person who has described the male-only priesthood as a sign of 'patriarchal resistance to women's equality. So I think she has officially challenged church teaching in ways that are beyond the pale.'"

== Reception ==
The Rev. John Beal, canon law professor at The Catholic University of America, called the group's solicitation of donations to "finance a major effort to expose the heretics within our Catholic colleges" "red-baiting in ecclesiastical garb". It has been criticized for "McCarthyite tactics" and a "fundamentalist agenda."

Charles L. Currie, president of the Association of Jesuit Colleges and Universities said that the society's "attacks can no longer go unchallenged," and characterized their work as "a long trail of distorted, inaccurate, and often untrue attacks on scholars addressing complex issues." Michael James, vice president of the Association of Catholic Colleges and Universities, said the society is "destructive and antithetical to a spirit of unity in our commitment to serve society and the church."

Reilly has been referred to in Catholic publications as the "self-appointed ayatollah to Catholic academia in this country." Rev. James Keenan, a priest and professor at Boston College who was targeted in a fundraising letter sent out by the Society, said "Hopefully, someday our bishops will call us to end this awful conduct, which hurts not only those of us targeted, but more importantly, the unity of the church itself." According to journalist Robert McClory, (Note: To be distinguished from Bishop Robert J. McClory) "If John Henry Newman, by some miracle of grace, were to rise from the dead today and be invited to speak at a prestigious Catholic institution, the most likely organization to protest and picket the event would be the Cardinal Newman Society."

The organization is also criticized for focusing on conservative political issues that are "only tangentially related to issues of Catholic higher education." One "review of 50 of the most recent headlines on the Society’s blog shows that 60% of them were related to abortion (9), homosexuality (10), or sexuality in general (10). That leaves only 40% for all other issues relating to Catholic education." When a group of Catholic scholars issued a statement calling on political leaders to consider the common good, the Newman Society attacked it saying that they were "distorting Church teaching in favor of left-leaning politics to take political shots at vice presidential nominee Paul Ryan." In their critique, however, the Society did not "cite a single instance where the statement strays from Catholic teaching. Instead, the Society makes an ad hominem attack on one of the signatories."
