= George Nauman Shuster =

American journalist

George Nauman Shuster was an American journalist, author, and educator who was born in Lancaster, Wisconsin in 1894 and died in South Bend, Indiana, on January 25, 1977. Born into German ethnic community, he attended Catholic schools and earned his A.B. degree at the University of Notre Dame in 1915. He served in Army intelligence during World War I. After that he studied at the universities of Poitiers and Berlin. He took a PhD in English literature at Columbia University. He was head of the English department at Notre Dame (1920–24); he taught English at Brooklyn Polytechnic Institute and St. Joseph's College for Women in Brooklyn. (1924–34).

Shuster was an increasingly prominent figure in the Catholic community during the 20th century. He was the editor of Commonweal, a Catholic magazine of news and commentary from 1928 to 1940; president of Hunter College in New York City, a school for women; assistant to President Theodore Hesburgh of the University of Notre Dame; and director of the Center for the Study of Man in Contemporary Society at Notre Dame. The center's major project was a three-year, nationwide study of Catholic elementary and secondary schools.

As an academic Shuster explored the influence of Catholicism in English literature in several scholarly monographs. In the 1930s he warned vigorously against the rise of Hitler and Naziism in Germany. He was a United States delegate to the United Nations Conference on International Education in 1945 and contributed to the establishment of UNESCO. He served as the American governor of Bavaria in 1950–1951. Shuster's reflections on a lifetime career in education are found in his books Education and Moral Wisdom (1960) and The Ground I Walked on: Reflections of a College President (1961). He also authored numerous topical articles, especially in the wake of Vatican Council II. In 1960 he was honored with Laetare Medal by of Notre Dame, awarded to those, "whose genius has ennobled the arts and sciences, illustrated the ideals of the church and enriched the heritage of humanity.".

== See also ==
- Theodore Hesburgh
- Land O'Lakes Statement minimizing the role of the Catholic Church in Catholic universities.
