= St. John's University strike of 1966–1967 =

The St. John's University strike of 1966–1967 was a strike by faculty at St. John's University in New York City which began on January 4, 1966, and ended in June 1967. The strike began after 31 faculty members were dismissed in the fall of 1965 without due process, dismissals which some felt were a violation of the professors' academic freedom. The strike ended without any re-instatements, but led to the widespread unionization of public college faculty in the New York City area.

== Cause of the strike ==
Low faculty salaries, the lack of a pension plan and insurance, and lack of faculty participation in University governance had led to conflicts with the Very Rev. Edward J. Burke, President of St. John's, during 1965, including a walk-out of about two hundred professors from a general faculty meeting on March 6, 1965. The continuing unrest led to Father Burke's removal as president by the board of trustees – he was replaced by the Very Rev. Joseph T. Cahill on July 15, 1965.

In the fall of 1965, 31 faculty members at St. John's University were dismissed without due process or any hearing. Both the American Association of University Professors (AAUP) and the United Federation of College Teachers (UFCT) claimed the university had violated the professors' academic freedom. St. John's, the two groups said, demanded that the faculty restrict their teaching to a narrow, dogmatic approach to Thomism and required faculty to submit all articles and books to the administration for clearance before seeking publication. Father Cahill, president of St. John's, said the teachers had used their classrooms for propaganda purposes.

The president of the UFCT, Israel Kugler, pushed for a more radical response to the dispute. The AAUP refused to engage in a strike, and largely withdrew from the dispute when faculty appeared to support Kugler. Kugler called for a strike to begin in January 1966, and widened the dispute to include pay and benefits (faculty pay was the lowest of the 10 largest Catholic universities in the U.S.). A National Citizens Committee for the Defense of Academic Freedom at St. John's University sponsored a rally at the Manhattan Center, attended by over 2,000 people. The committee was co-chaired by historian Richard Hofstadter of Columbia University, and John Leo, associate editor of Commonweal.

== The strike begins ==
The strike at St. John's started on January 4, 1966, in the midst of a city-wide transit strike that began three days earlier. The union pushed for mediation and arbitration in December 1965, but the university refused to submit to either. Using tactics pioneered by Albert Shanker to win collective bargaining rights for New York City public school teachers, Kugler pushed for local and state government officials to get involved in the dispute. Only a minority of St. John's faculty walked out, forcing the university to close some but not a majority of classes.

During the next two years, Kugler challenged the university's accreditation before the Middle States Association of Colleges and Schools twice. But that body only warned the university and took no further action. The National Citizens Committee for the Defense of Academic Freedom at St. John's University placed several large advertisements in the New York Times, seeking to keep the strike on readers' minds and embarrass the University at the same time.

The union raised $250,000 from the Workmen's Circle and other organizations to support the striking faculty. Kugler took professors' case to the Vatican and sought an individual audience with Pope Paul VI, whose encyclicals on workers' rights were repeatedly cited by the union. But the pope refused him an audience.

Other tactics were tried as well. Some faculty sued the university for fraud for including their names in the 1966 catalog of classes. Pickets went up at the spring 1966 commencement and the fall 1966 opening convocation.

== The strike ends ==
In the early spring of 1967, as the strike threatened to widen to other Catholic universities in the country and state legislators opened hearings on the labor dispute, the university agreed to arbitration.

The strike ended in June 1967. The union did not win recognition at St. John's, and in 1970 arbitrators ruled that the university had not acted improperly.

== Assessment and outcomes ==
Although the strike was a failure in that it did not win reinstatement for the faculty, the strike established the American Federation of Teachers (AFT) as the pre-eminent union organizing American higher education faculty. Kugler quickly turned the UFCT's attention to other colleges and universities in the New York City area. In the next few years, under his leadership the union organized locals at the Fashion Institute of Technology (FIT), Nassau Community College and Westchester Community College. In 1967, Kugler began pushing for the UFCT to organize the faculty at CUNY. Backed by the AFT and the newly formed (and politically powerful) United Federation of Teachers, UFCT not only won an agreement for a union election but won the December 6, 1968, election in the face of a determined challenge from the AAUP. The union won a second election (this time for non-tenured faculty) nine days later, and a signed contract nine months later.

In 1972, Kugler merged the UFCT with its long-time rival, the Legislative Conference of the City University. The two groups formed a new organization affiliated with the AFT, the Professional Staff Congress (PSC). As of 2007, the PSC represented more than 20,000 faculty and staff members at CUNY.

Kugler later wrote an article about the strike, "The 1966 Strike at St. John's University: A Memoir," which was published in Labor's Heritage in 1997.
