= International Federation of Catholic Universities =

Catholic international higher education organization

- Fédération Internationale des Universités Catholiques (French)
- English version of the logo for the International Federation of Catholic Universities

- French variant
- Abbreviation: IFCU; FIUC
- Formation: 1924/1948
- Type: International Federation and universities
- Headquarters: 9, 21 Rue d'Assas, 75006 Paris, France
- Secretary General: François Mabille
- Website: http://fiuc-ifcu.org/

The International Federation of Catholic Universities (French: Fédération Internationale des Universités Catholiques) is an organisation of 226 Catholic universities throughout the world. The secretariat is at the Institut Catholique de Paris.

== History ==
The federation has its origins in collaboration in 1924 between the Università Cattolica del Sacro Cuore in Milan and the Catholic university of Nijmegen in the Netherlands. It was created by a Papal Decree in 1948 as the Fœderatio Universitatum Catholicarum it became the International Federation of Catholic Universities in 1965. The FIUC facilitates, research, partnership and exchange programmes between catholic institutes of education. In 2023, it had 226 members universities in the world.

== Regional groups ==
The IFCU is broken up into a number of regions of the world:

- Federation of European Catholic Universities (FUCE)
- Association of Catholic Universities and Institutes of Africa and Madagascar (ACUIAM)
- Association of Southeast and East Asian Catholic Colleges and Universities (ASEACCU)
- The Organisation of Catholic Universities in Latin America (ODUCAL)
- Association of Catholic Colleges and Universities (ACCU) in North America
- The Xavier Board of Higher Education in India

== List of secretaries-general ==
- François Mabille, November 2019
