= Theodore Hesburgh =

American Catholic priest and 15th president of Notre Dame

The Reverend Theodore Hesburgh C.S.C.
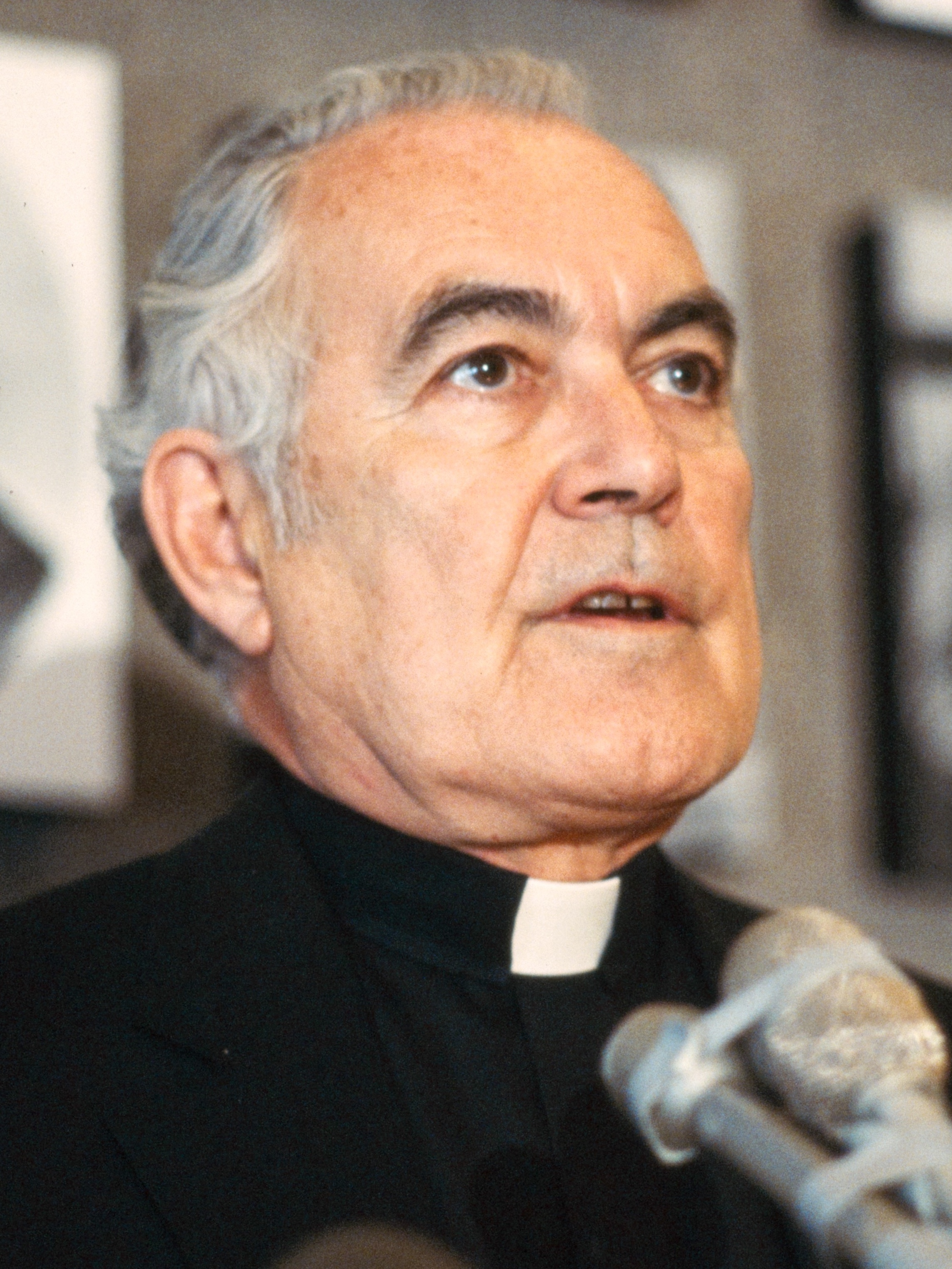
- Hesburgh c. 1979

15th President of the University of Notre Dame
- In office June 28, 1952 – June 1, 1987
- Preceded by: John J. Cavanaugh
- Succeeded by: Edward Malloy

Chair of the United States Commission on Civil Rights
- In office 1969–1972
- President: Richard Nixon
- Preceded by: John A. Hannah
- Succeeded by: Arthur S. Flemming

Personal details
- Born: Theodore Martin Hesburgh; May 25, 1917 Syracuse, New York, U.S.
- Died: February 26, 2015 (aged 97) Notre Dame, Indiana, U.S.
- Resting place: Holy Cross Cemetery
- Education: Pontifical Gregorian University (PhB); Catholic University of America (STD)
- Awards: Presidential Medal of Freedom; Congressional Gold Medal

The Reverend Theodore Hesburgh C.S.C.

Orders
- Ordination: June 24, 1943 by John F. Noll

Personal details
- Denomination: Catholic

Theodore Martin Hesburgh, C.S.C. (May 25, 1917 – February 26, 2015) was an American Catholic priest and academic who was a member of the Congregation of Holy Cross. He served as president of the University of Notre Dame for 35 years from 1952 to 1987, along with numerous appointed positions in the U.S. government, including as chairman of the United States Commission on Civil Rights.

In addition to his career as an educator and author, Hesburgh was a public servant and social activist involved in numerous American civic and government initiatives, commissions, international humanitarian projects, and papal assignments. He received numerous honors and awards for his service, most notably the United States's Presidential Medal of Freedom (1964) and Congressional Gold Medal (2000). As of 2026, he holds the world's record for the individual with the most honorary degrees with 150.

Hesburgh is credited with bringing Notre Dame, long known for its football program, to the forefront of American Catholic universities and its transition to a nationally respected institution of higher education. He supervised the university's dramatic growth, as well as the successful transfer of its ownership from Holy Cross priests to the Notre Dame board of trustees in 1967. In 1972, during his tenure as president, the university also became a coeducational institution.

In addition to his service to Notre Dame, Hesburgh held leadership positions in numerous groups involved in civil rights, peaceful uses of atomic energy, immigration reform, and Third World development. Hesburgh was also active on the boards of numerous businesses, nonprofits, civic organizations, and Vatican missions.

== Early life and education ==
Hesburgh was born on May 25, 1917, in Syracuse, New York, to Theodore Bernard Hesburgh, a Pittsburgh Plate Glass warehouse manager, and Anne Murphy Hesburgh. His father was of Luxembourgish ancestry; his mother's family was of Irish descent. Theodore was the second child and oldest son in a family of five children that included two boys and three girls. He attended Most Holy Rosary, a parochial school in Syracuse, and also served as an altar boy. Hesburgh claimed that he had wished to become a priest since the age of six. Thomas Duffy, a missionary priest from the Congregation of Holy Cross, which owned the University of Notre Dame, encouraged Hesburgh's interest in joining the priesthood.

Hesburgh graduated from Most Holy Rosary High School in Syracuse in 1934 and enrolled in the Holy Cross Seminary at Notre Dame in the fall. In 1937, his teachers decided to send the promising young seminarian to study in Rome, Italy, where he graduated from the Pontifical Gregorian University with a bachelor of philosophy degree in 1940. When the American consul in Rome ordered all U.S. citizens to leave Italy in 1940 due to the outbreak of World War II, Hesburgh returned to the United States to continue his studies. He spent three years (1940–43) studying theology at the Holy Cross College in Washington, D.C. and two years (1943–45) studying at The Catholic University of America, where he earned a doctorate in sacred theology in 1945.

On June 24, 1943, Hesburgh was ordained a priest for the Congregation of Holy Cross at Notre Dame's Sacred Heart Church, later redesignated the Basilica of the Sacred Heart. Inspired by an inscription carved in stone above the church's door, Hesburgh dedicated his life to "God, Country, and Notre Dame." Afterwards, Hesburgh returned to Washington, D.C. to complete his studies and assist at area parishes. In addition, Hesburgh served as a chaplain at the National Training School for Boys, a juvenile detention facility, and at a military installation. He also ran a large United Service Organization (USO) club in a Knights of Columbus hall in Washington, D.C. Although Hesburgh expressed an interest in serving as a chaplain in the U.S. Navy during World War II, he returned to Notre Dame, Indiana, in 1945 after completion of his studies in Washington, D.C. to begin a teaching career at the university.

== Career ==
=== Early years ===
Hesburgh joined the Notre Dame faculty as an instructor in the university's Department of Religion in 1945. In 1948 Hesburgh was named head of the Department of Theology, and in 1949 Notre Dame's president, John J. Cavanaugh, C.S.C., appointed Hesburgh executive vice president. Three years later, at the age of thirty-five, Hesburgh succeeded Cavanaugh as president.

=== President of Notre Dame ===
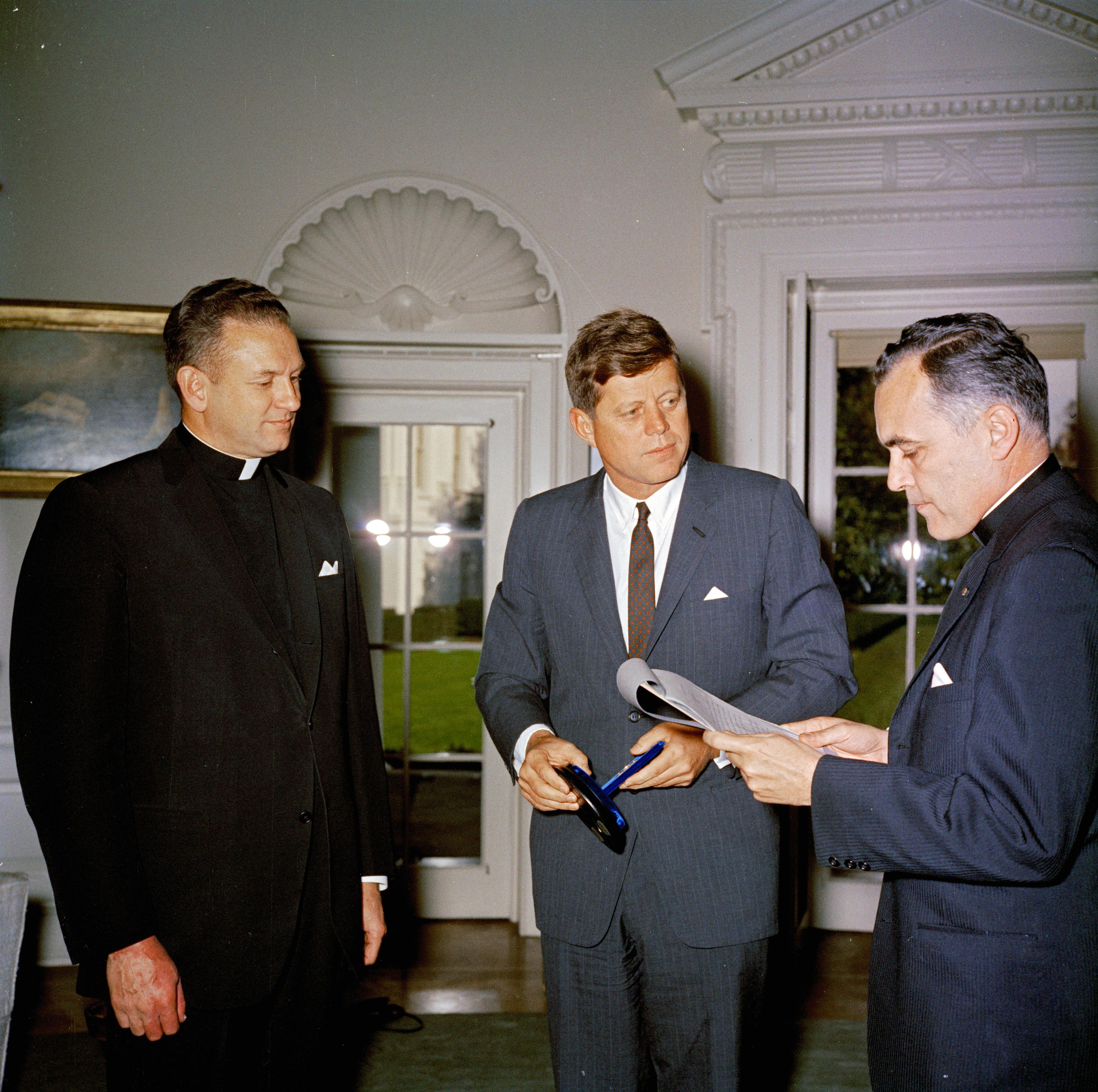
Hesburgh presents the Laetare Medal to John F. Kennedy on November 22, 1961

Hesburgh served as Notre Dame's president for thirty-five years, from 1952 until his retirement in 1987. At that time his was "the longest presidency in American higher education." Hesburgh immediately began efforts to transform the school, primarily known for its football program, "into a nationally respected institution of higher learning." In 1953 the university created the Distinguished Professors Program to attract top scholars to Notre Dame. By the time of Hesburgh's retirement in 1987, the school had established more than a hundred distinguished professorships.

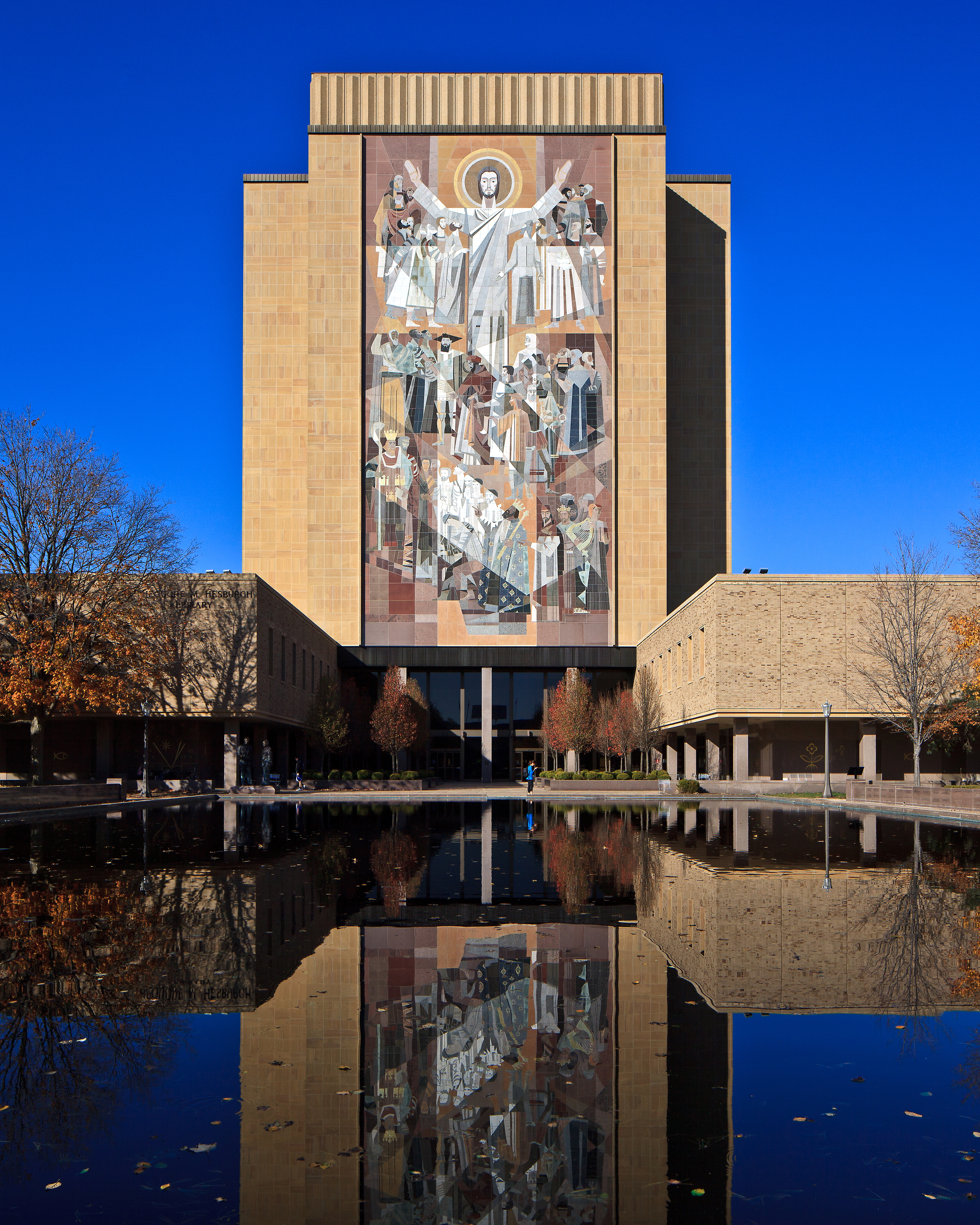
Hesburgh Library at the University of Notre Dame, which features the Word of Life mural (also known as Touchdown Jesus)

Hesburgh supervised dramatic growth at the university and expansion of its endowment, as well as its transition to a coeducational institution that occurred in 1972. During his presidency (1952–1987), the annual operating budget increased from $9.7 million to $176.6 million and the university's endowment increased from $9 million to $350 million. Research funding increased from $735,000 to $15 million. Student enrollment nearly doubled from 4,979 to 9,676, and its faculty more than doubled from 389 to 951. The average faculty salary rose from $5,400 to $50,800. The number of degrees conferred annually doubled from 1,212 to 2,663. While Hesburgh was president, the university also initiated forty new building projects, including the $8 million library with the famous "Word of Life" mural, better known as "Touchdown Jesus," on its façade.

Hesburgh played a key role in developing the Land O'Lakes Statement that North American representatives of the International Federation of Catholic Universities issued in 1967. The document outlined a commitment to academic freedom with independent governance and insisted that "a Catholic university properly developed can even more fully achieve the ideal of a true university." The statement created some controversy because it declared that Catholic universities should be autonomous, free from all authority, including the Catholic Church. Despite the conflicts that the statement initiated, Hesburg's commitment to excellence "transformed Notre Dame into one of the most recognizable and prestigious Catholic universities in the United States". In 1967, Hesburgh ended the university's exclusive, century-long leadership by the Congregation of Holy Cross clergy. Hesburgh and Howard Kenna worked together to establish a plan for transferring ownership of the university from the Congregation of Holy Cross priests to the University of Notre Dame Board of Trustees. The new governing board included laypersons and Holy Cross priests as trustees and fellows.

During the 1960s, when student demonstrations occurred at colleges and universities across the United States, Hesburgh and many other collegiate presidents came under attack. For Notre Dame, the climax of student unrest occurred in the 1968–69 academic year. On February 17, 1969, Hesburgh took a controversial position in dealing with anti-Vietnam War student activism on campus when he issued an eight-page letter to the student body outlining the university's stance on protests. Hesburgh's letter stated that student protesters who violated the rights of others or disrupted the school's operations would be given fifteen minutes to cease and desist before facing suspension or expulsion if they refused to disperse. Hesburgh's action provoked controversy and made national headlines. The letter was reprinted in the New York Times, the Wall Street Journal, and the Washington Post. Although Hesburgh was criticized harshly by many Notre Dame students, some of whom demanded his resignation, responses to editorials in 250 newspapers about his "fifteen-minute rule" were nearly all favorable. In addition, President Richard Nixon sent Hesburgh a telegram praising his "tough stance" on the campus's student protests.

At President Nixon's request, Hesburgh offered advice to Vice President Spiro Agnew in a letter written on February 27, 1969, that included suggestions for potential actions that could be taken to control the violence on college campuses. Hesburgh, who generally disagreed with the Nixon administration's policy in Vietnam and favored an accelerated withdrawal of U.S. troops, advised against repressive legislation to control campus protests. Hesburgh argued that university and college administrations should be allowed to continue to decide the appropriate action to take on their respective campuses. The National Governors Conference agreed with his view; the majority of state governors opposed the proposed legislation. In October 1969, Hesburgh publicly expressed his opposition to the war by signing a letter with other college presidents calling for withdrawal of U.S. forces from Vietnam and was present at an on-campus peace Mass with 2,500 Notre Dame students the following day.

Hesburgh, a member and later chair of the U.S. Civil Rights Commission, was publicly vocal in his support for equal rights, but he did not immediately recognize or take significant action to eliminate institutional racism at Notre Dame, where the number of black students and employees "remained at token levels until the late 1960s." In 1969, after some of Notre Dame's African American student activists criticized the small number of blacks enrolled at the university, Hesburgh appointed a student-faculty committee to assess the issue. The committee's findings caused him to take immediate measures to increase minority employment and aggressively recruit minority students. Hesburgh also persuaded the university's trustees to lift their forty-year ban on participation in postseason football games and used revenue generated from Notre Dame's bowl game appearances to fund minority scholarships. The Notre Dame Fighting Irish's win over the University of Texas Longhorns in the Cotton Bowl Classic in 1970 raised $300,000 for Notre Dame's scholarship fund.

Notre Dame, as with other colleges and universities around the country, continued to experience antiwar protests as the Vietnam War escalated. In early May 1970, after learning of rumors that a group of students and antiwar activists planned to firebomb the Notre Dame campus's Reserve Officers' Training Corps (ROTC) building, Hesburgh responded with a public statement on May 4. In an address to a crowd of approximately 2,000 students, Hesburgh spoke against the war and objected to Nixon's decision to send troops into Cambodia. During his conciliatory remarks, Hesburgh also outlined steps that he thought the government could take to address student concerns. On May 18, Hesburgh sent a letter to President Nixon and a copy of his address, which became known as the Hesburgh Declaration. Although campus unrest caused classes to be canceled on May 6, Notre Dame's seven days of protest ended without damage, violence, or National Guard presence as happened on many other college campuses, such as Columbia University, the University of California, Berkeley, and elsewhere.

By the early 1970s, Hesburgh had become the most well-known Catholic in the United States. He continued to respond to student concerns during the 1970s and 1980s. To increase student involvement in the administration's decision-making process, Hesburgh added student representatives to university committees.

While Hesburgh had no direct involvement with athletics at Notre Dame - that job was the province of his close friend and associate, university Executive Vice President Rev. Edmund Joyce - Hesburgh did observe that:

"There is no academic virtue in playing mediocre football and no academic vice in winning a game that by all odds one should lose...There has indeed been a surrender at Notre Dame, but it is a surrender to excellence on all fronts, and in this we hope to rise above ourselves with the help of God."

=== Civic and U.S. government activist ===
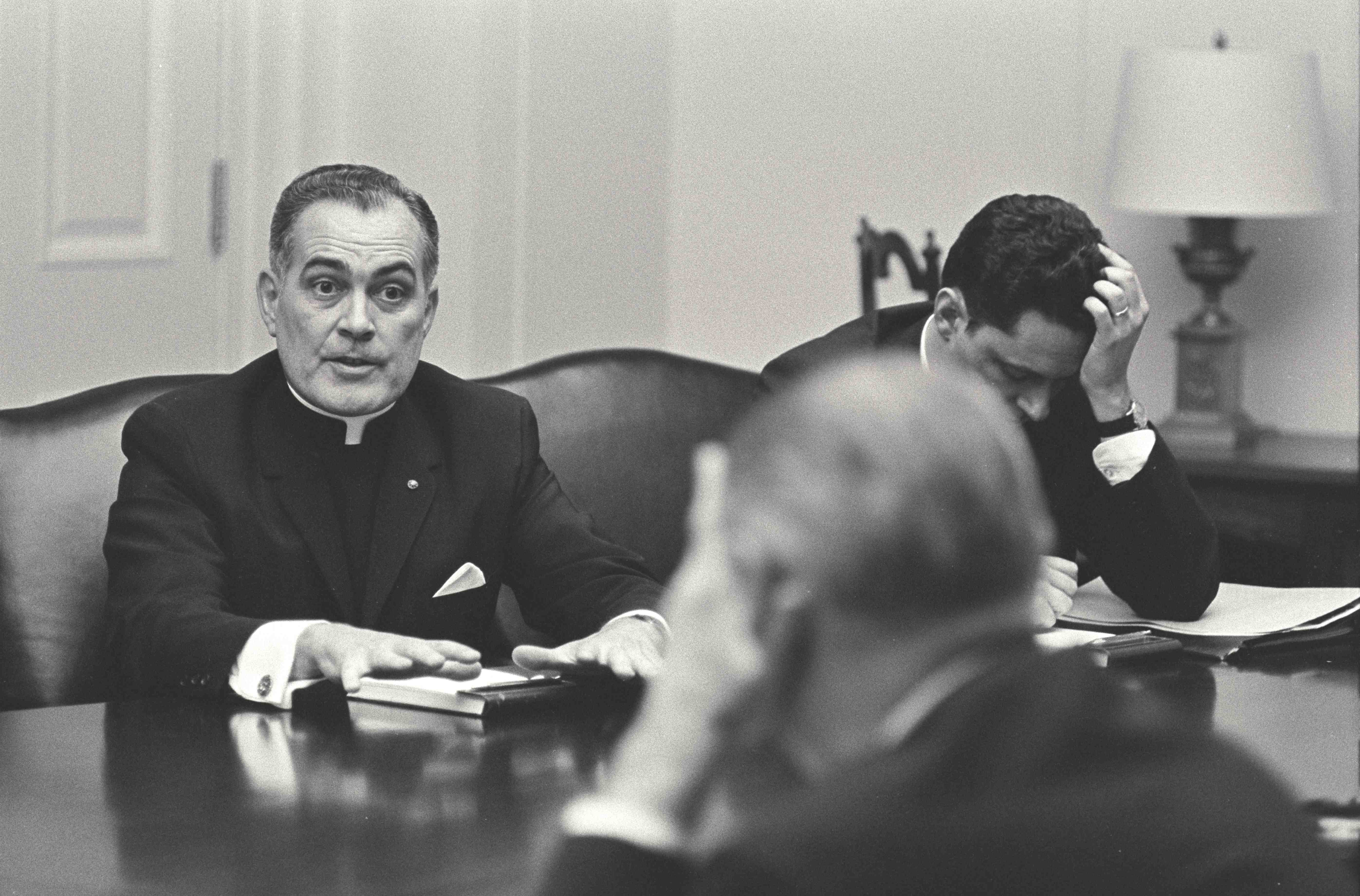
Hesburgh chairs the Civil Rights Committee

Hesburgh's career included many civic activities, as well as American and international initiatives beyond his work at Notre Dame. Hesburgh estimated he spent about 40 percent of his time off-campus and believed that his civic involvement "enriched" his priesthood.

Beginning in 1955, Hesburgh served in a number of posts on government commissions that included National Science Board and the U.S. Civil Rights Commission, and also served on the boards of non-profit organizations, such as the Rockefeller Foundation, and Vatican missions. His career included at least sixteen presidential appointments involving some of the major social issues of his era: civil rights, campus unrest, Third World development, peaceful uses of atomic energy, and immigration reform, "including the American policy of amnesty for immigrants in the mid-1980s."

Hesburgh's first presidential appointment occurred in 1954, when President Dwight Eisenhower appointed him to the National Science Board. Although Hesburgh had no previous experience as an activist supporting civil rights issues, President Eisenhower made him a member of the U.S. Civil Rights Commission in 1957, beginning fifteen years of service on the commission. Hesburgh emerged as a civil rights advocate and spokesperson for the commission. In an appendix to the commission's annual report in 1959, Hesburgh outlined his position on civil rights and equality:

I believe that civil rights were not created, but only recognized and formulated, by our Federal and State constitutions and charters. Civil rights are important corollaries of the great proposition … that every human person is a res sacra, a sacred reality, and as such is entitled to the opportunity of fulfilling those great human potentials with which God has endowed every man.

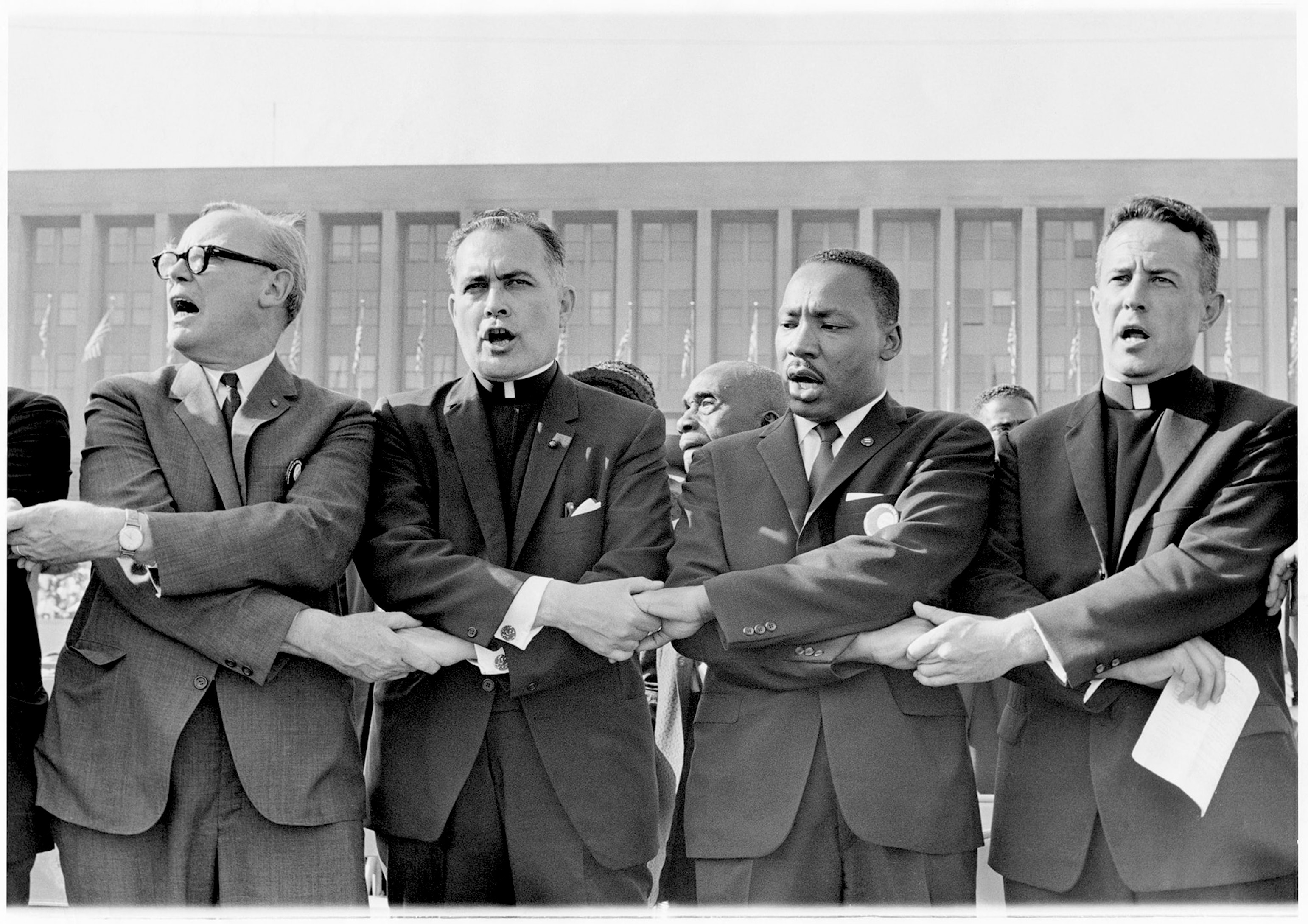
Hesburgh with Martin Luther King Jr. in 1964

In 1961 Hesburgh persuaded the Indiana Conference of Higher Education to support a Notre Dame-based pilot project for President John F. Kennedy's new Peace Corps initiative that trained new volunteers for service in Chile, but he felt that the Kennedy administration had a poor record on civil rights issues. In contrast to his assessment of the Kennedy administration's civil rights efforts, Hesburgh praised Lyndon B. Johnson's work to secure passage of the Civil Rights Act of 1964 in the U.S. Congress and his courage for supporting the Voting Rights Act of 1965. Hesburgh also made public appearances to show his support for the civil rights movement. On July 21, 1964, Hesburgh delivered an impromptu speech during Martin Luther King Jr.'s civil rights rally in Chicago, Illinois. At the conclusion of the event, he joined hands with King and other civil rights supporters as the group sang "We Shall Overcome."

Hesburgh served as chairman of the U.S. Civil Rights Commission from 1969, when President Nixon appointed him to the leadership position, until 1972, when White House aides asked for Hesburgh's resignation. His dismissal from the commission in 1972 followed a series of disagreements between Hesburgh, the commission, and the Nixon administration about civil rights policies. Hesburgh objected to the president's slowdown policy on school desegregation, opposed Nixon's anti-busing policy, and advocated for the renewal of the Voting Rights Act, which the Nixon administration wanted to amend. Hesburgh publicly explained that he believed the primary reason for his dismissal was due to the commission's report on minority employment in government.

According to Rick Perlstein in Nixonland (2008), when Thomas Eagleton dropped out of the race as George McGovern's vice presidential running mate in the 1972 presidential election, Hesburgh was among many people considered as a replacement candidate for Eagleton, but he declined the offer. In the 1970s, Hesburgh made public his approval for the ratification of the Equal Rights Amendment. During that decade, the organization Catholics Act for ERA sent out marketing materials on behalf of the amendment quoting support from Hesburgh.

President Jimmy Carter appointed Hesburgh to a blue-ribbon immigration reform commission in 1979; the commission's finding that any national immigration reform proposals can succeed only if the American national border is properly secured beforehand was cited by various opponents of illegal immigration to the United States. His efforts on the commission led to the passing of the Refugee Act of 1980, and the creation of a professional Asylum Corps in the 1990s.

=== Papal appointments ===
Hesburgh served as a permanent Holy See representative from 1956 to 1970 to the International Atomic Energy Agency in Vienna, Austria. Pope Paul VI appointed Hesburgh as head of the Vatican representatives attending the twentieth anniversary of the United Nations' human rights declaration in Tehran, Iran, and as a member of the Holy See's U.N. delegation in 1974. Pope John Paul II appointed Hesburgh to the Pontifical Council for Culture in 1983.

=== Business and nonprofit foundation leader ===
Throughout his career, Hesburgh was active on many advisory boards related to higher education, science, business, and civic affairs. He also traveled the world on behalf of the university and the organizations he served.

In the field of higher education, Hesburgh was a contributor to The Pursuit of Excellence (1958), an analysis of the U.S. education system that the Rockefeller Brothers Fund commissioned as part of its Special Studies Project. Hesburgh also served as a member of the International Federation of Catholic Universities, and as its president from 1963 to 1970; a board member and eventual president of the Association of American Colleges and Universities; a board member of the American Council on Education; and a board member of the Institute of International Education, among other education-related groups.

In 1990, during his retirement years, Hesburgh became the first priest to be elected to the Harvard Board of Overseers (board of directors), and served from 1994 to 1996 as the board's president. Hesburgh also served as co-chairman of the Knight Commission on Intercollegiate Athletics that made significant revisions to the regulation of American collegiate sports.

Hesburgh was involved with several science-related projects and organizations. From 1956 until 1970, he served as the permanent Vatican representative to the International Atomic Energy Agency in Vienna, Austria. In addition to serving on the U.S. National Science Board, Hesburgh was appointed U.S. ambassador to the 1979 United Nations Conference on Science and Technology for Development. He also served with the Midwestern Universities Research Association and the Nutrition Foundation Board. While serving on the board of the United States Institute of Peace, Hesburgh "helped organize a meeting of scientists and representative leaders of six faith traditions who called for the elimination of nuclear weapons."

Hesburgh was a board member of numerous business and civic organizations. From 1961 to 1982 he served on the board of the Rockefeller Foundation, and from 1977 to 1982 as board chairman. Hesburgh also served as a director for the Chase Manhattan Bank and was one of the four main founders of People for the American Way, which was among many other organizations he served with. Hesburgh's interest in international affairs also led to his service on numerous international commissions and humanitarian projects.

== Later years ==
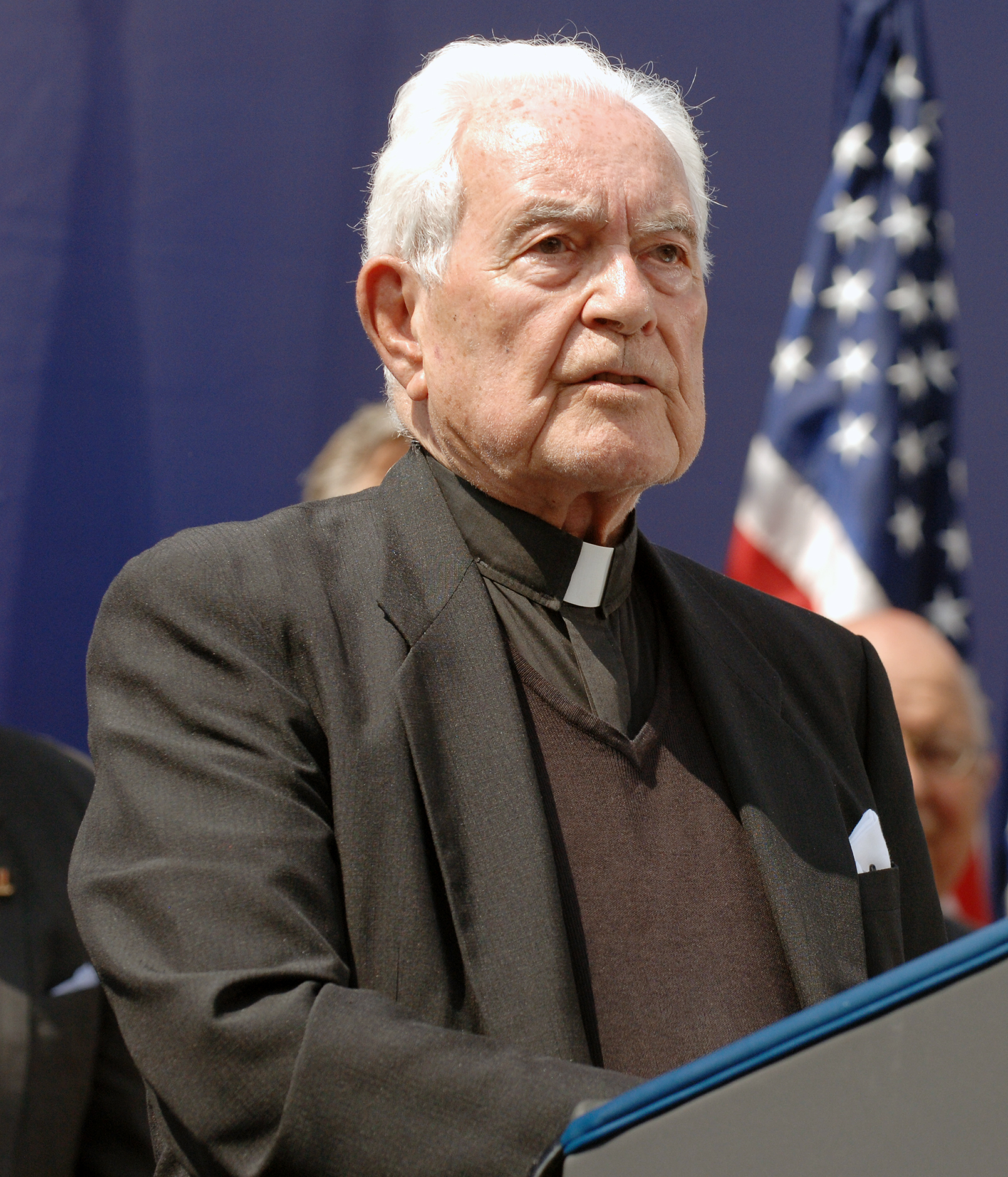
Hesburgh in 2008

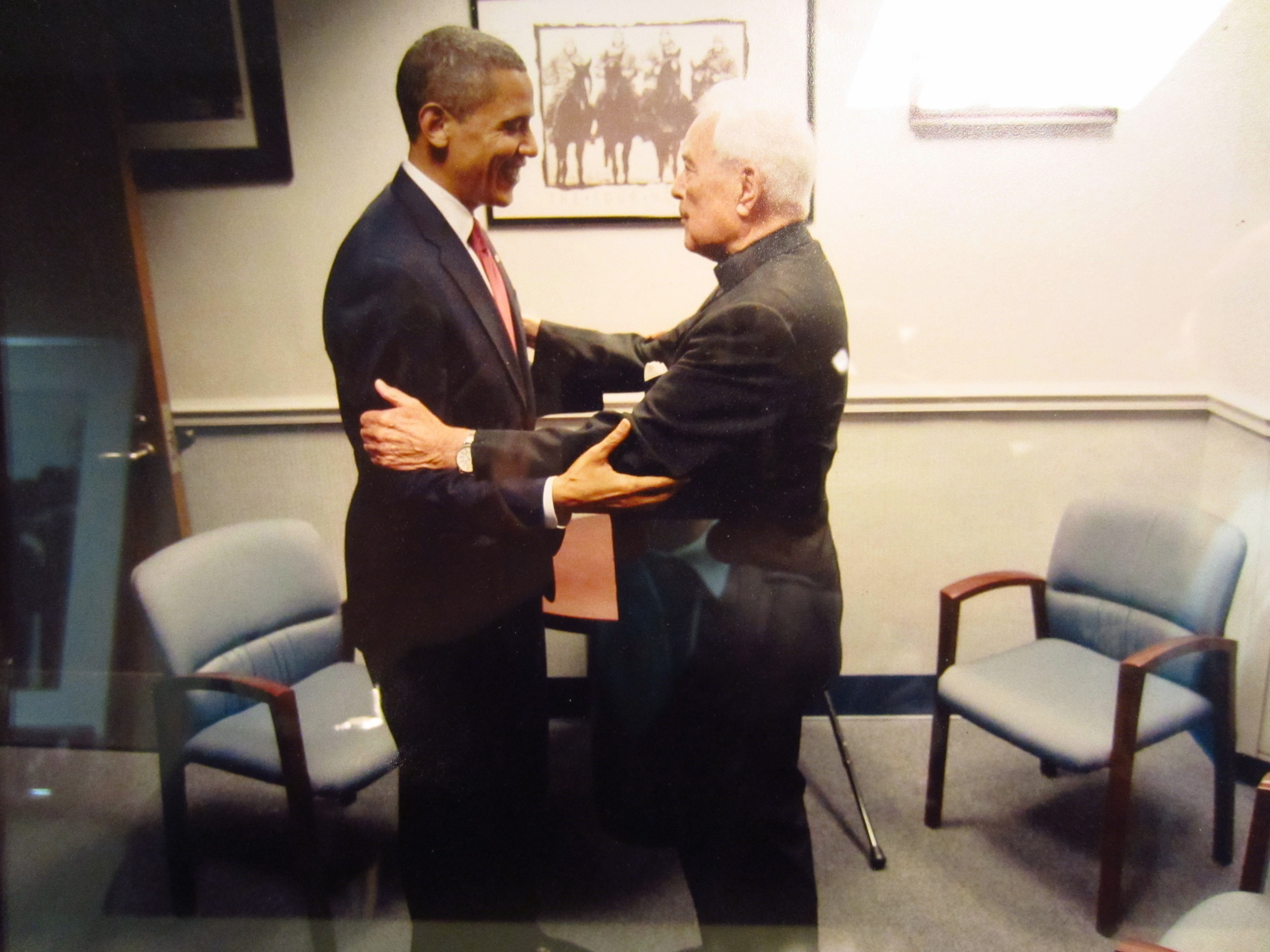
Hesburgh greets President Barack Obama at Notre Dame in 2009

External videos
- Booknotes interview with Hesburgh on God, Country, Notre Dame, February 10, 1991, C-SPAN

After his retirement as president of the University of Notre Dame in 1987, Hesburgh took a year off for travel and vacation. Upon his return, he came to campus to work each day at his new office on the thirteenth floor of the library that eventually bore his name, and wrote his autobiography, God, Country, Notre Dame: The Autobiography of Theodore M. Hesburgh (1990) with Jerry Reedy. The book spent six weeks on the New York Times best-seller list. At the conclusion of the book, Hesburgh remarked:

I believe that with faith in God and in our fellow humans, we can aim for the heights of human endeavor, and that we can teach them, too.

Hesburgh kept busy in his retirement years, which also included time to relax at the Holy Cross property at Land O' Lakes, Wisconsin. He wrote regularly, including a second book, Travels with Ted and Ned (1992), which received mixed reviews, and edited The Challenge and Promise of a Catholic University (1994), a collection of essays on Catholic higher education. Hesburgh continued to deliver speeches and lectures, as well as serving on numerous boards and committees, including his controversial decision in 1994 to co-chair the legal defense fund for President Bill Clinton and First Lady Hillary Clinton with former U.S. Attorney General Nicholas Katzenbach.

Hesburgh was especially active in the development of five institutions he organized: the Ecumenical Institute for Theology Studies at Tantur, Jerusalem; Notre Dame's Center for Civil and Human Rights; the Helen Kellogg Institute for International Studies; the Kroc Institute for International Peace Studies; and the Hank Family Environmental Research Center. Other retirement activities included co-chairing the Knight Commission with William C. "Bill" Friday, former president of the University of North Carolina, and joining the Harvard Board of Overseers in 1990. In 2009, he supported the invitation to Barack Obama to speak at Notre Dame, which was controversial because of Obama's strong endorsement of pro-choice legislation.

== Death and legacy ==
Hesburgh died on February 26, 2015, at the age of 97. His death, funeral, and memorial service gained widespread media attention. Attendees and speakers at the memorial service included former President Jimmy Carter, Condoleezza Rice, Lou Holtz, then cardinal Theodore McCarrick and cardinal Roger Mahony, former U.S. senator Harris L. Wofford, Indiana governor Mike Pence, former First Lady Rosalynn Carter, former U.S. senator Alan K. Simpson, U.S. senator Joe Donnelly, William G. Bowen, and a video message from President Barack Obama.

Father Hesburgh was the president of the University of Notre Dame from 1952 to 1987. He was an American Catholic priest and educator who achieved national prominence through his public service work. He increased the stature and size of the university, liberalized the rules regulating student life, promoted academic freedom, and worked toward making Notre Dame one of the top universities in the country, doubling its enrollment and greatly increasing its endowment. He transferred its governance from the Congregation of Holy Cross to a mixed lay and religious board and oversaw the admittance of women students in 1972. He was also the chairman of the United States Commission on Civil Rights and of the Select Commission on Immigration and Refugee Policy. He received numerous awards, including the Presidential Medal of Freedom (1964) and a Congressional Gold Medal (1999), and more than 150 honorary degrees. He was a steadfast champion for human rights, the cause of peace, and care for the poor.

Hesburgh's leadership as president of the University of Notre Dame brought it to the forefront of American Catholic universities. A Time magazine cover story from February 9, 1962, named him as "the most influential figure in the reshaping of Catholic higher education in the U.S." Long known for its football program, Notre Dame also became known for its academics. While Hesburgh was slow to recognize that Notre Dame's "policies and practices unintentionally produced unequal outcomes," he took decisive action after its minority students challenged him to do so. By the 1970s Notre Dame was a "much more diverse university than it had been ten years earlier."

The university has named several buildings, scholarships, and academic programs in his honor, including the Hesburgh Library, the Hesburgh Institute for International Studies, which Hesburgh founded in 1985, the Hesburgh-Yusko Scholarship, and the Hesburgh International Scholar Experience. Hesburgh's papers are housed in the Archives of the University of Notre Dame. Notre Dame's Hesburgh Library initially opened as the Memorial Library on September 18, 1963, and was renamed in his honor in 1987. In his retirement, Hesburgh maintained a private office on the library's thirteenth floor.

Hesburgh, one of the country's "most respected clergyman," was a strong supporter of interfaith dialogue. He also brought a Catholic perspective to the numerous government commissions, civic initiatives, and other projects in which he was involved. From his position within the American political establishment and as a major figure in the Catholic Church from the 1950s to the 1990s, he used his influence to urge support of political policies and legislation to help solve national problems.

Hesburgh remained an activist for most of his adult life, especially in the area of civil rights and equality. He played a significant role in national affairs, beginning in the mid-twentieth century, and became well known for his liberal point of view, which was based on concepts of freedom and autonomy. Hesburgh supported the peaceful use of atomic energy, aid to developing Third World countries (especially Africa and Latin America), and civil rights and equality. Although his remarks and actions were controversial at times, "he nearly always came through unscathed."

As a fifteen-year member of the U.S. Civil Rights Commission, Hesburgh took a public stand against racism and prejudice. He used his skills as a leader to forge strong alliances, even with those who held different political philosophies. For Hesburgh, civil rights were a moral issue, as he once declared:

Our moral blindness has given us a divided America and ugly America complete with black ghettos. …We allow children to grow up in city jungles, to attend disgraceful schools, to be surrounded with every kind of physical and moral ugliness, and then we are surprised if they are low in aspiration and accomplishment.

While Hesburgh was criticized by some for his social and political ideas, many praised his "contributions to ecumenism, civil rights, and world peace".

In 2018, Hesburgh, a documentary film directed by Patrick Creadon, was released. It covers Hesburgh's life, particularly his presidency at Notre Dame and his work in civil rights.

== Presidential appointments ==
- National Science Board (1954–56), Committee on International Science
- National War College, Board of Consultants
- Overseas Development Council (1971–82)
- President's Commission on All-Volunteer Armed Forces
- President's Committee on the Holocaust
- President's General Advisory Committee on Foreign Assistance Programs
- Presidential Clemency Board (1974–75)
- U.S. Advisory Committee on International Educational and Cultural Affairs (1962–65)
- U.S. Ambassador and chair, U.S. Delegation to the United Nations Conference on Science and Technology for Development (1979)
- U.S. Commission on Civil Rights (1957–72)
- U.S. Commission on United States-Latin American Relations
- U.S. Institute of Peace, Board of Directors
- U.S. Naval Academy, Board of Visitors
- U.S. Official Observer Team for El Salvador Elections (1982)
- U.S. Select Commission on Immigration and Relief Policy (1979–81)
- U.S. State Department, Policy Planning Council

== Selected published works ==
=== Books ===
- The Relation of the Sacramental Characters of Baptism and Confirmation to the Lay Apostle. 1946.
- The Theology of Catholic Action. 1946.
- God and the World of Man. 1950.
- Pattern for Educational Growth: Six Discourses at the University of Notre Dame. 1958.
- Thoughts for Our Times. 1961.
- More Thoughts for Our Times. 1964.
- Still More Thoughts for Our Times. 1966.
- Thought IV: Five Addresses. 1967.
- Thoughts for Our Times V. 1969.
- With Paul A. Miller and Clifton R. Wharton Jr., Pattern for Lifelong Learning. 1973.
- The Human Imperative: A Challenge for the Year. 1974.
- The Hesburgh Papers: High Values in Higher Education. 1979.
- With Jerry Reedy, God, Country, Notre Dame: The Autobiography of Theodore M. Hesburgh. New York: Doubleday. 1990.
- Travels with Ted and Ned. 1992.
- Editor, The Challenge and Promise of a Catholic University. 1994.

== Honors and awards ==
External videos
- Presentation of the Congressional Gold Medal to Father Hesburgh by President Bill Clinton, July 13, 2000, C-SPAN

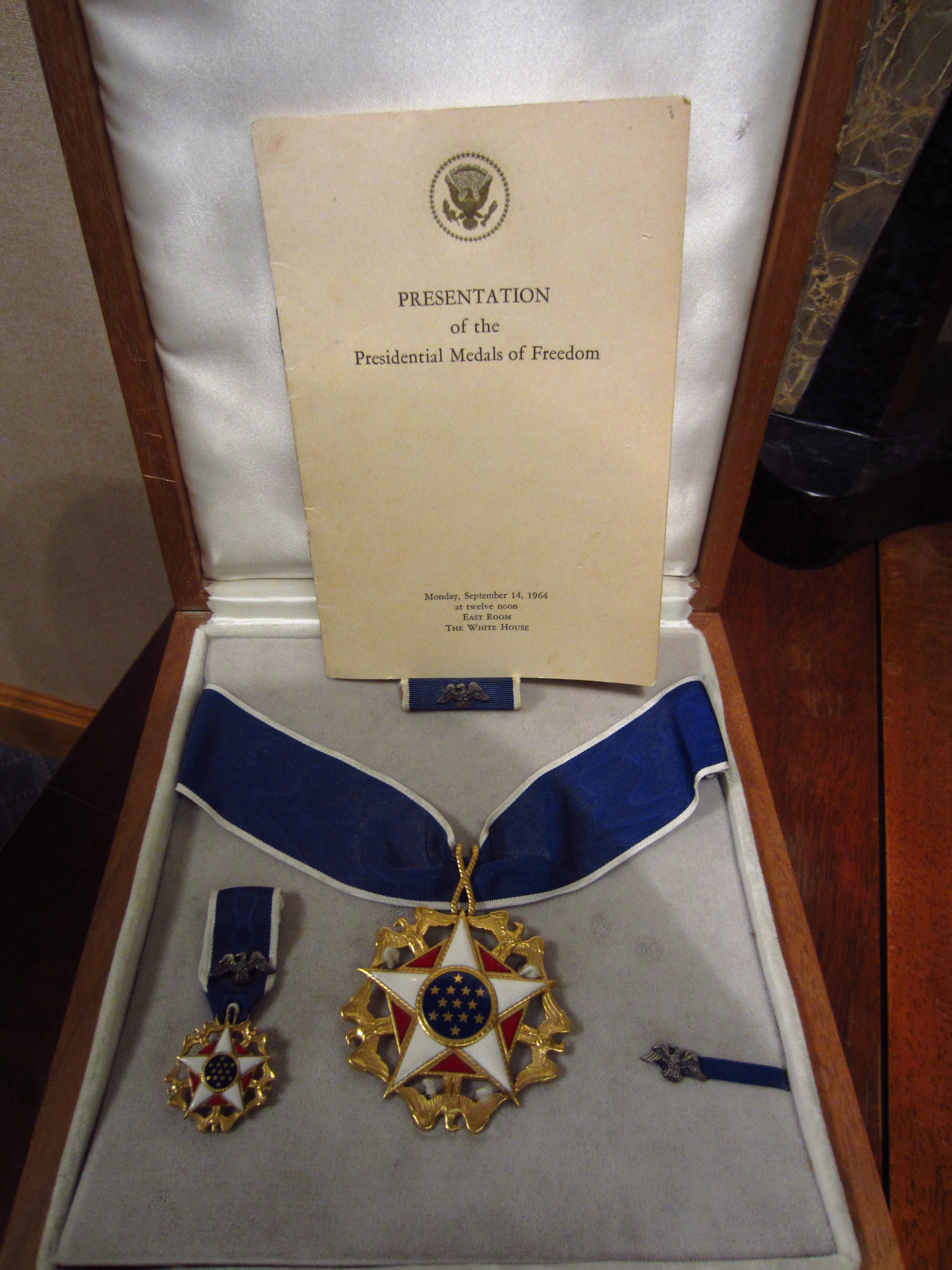
Hesburgh's Presidential Medal of Freedom

Hesburgh received numerous honors and awards for his public service. In 1964, President Johnson awarded Hesburgh the Medal of Freedom, the nation's highest civilian honor. In 2000, Hesburgh was awarded the Congressional Gold Medal, the first person from higher education to receive the honor.

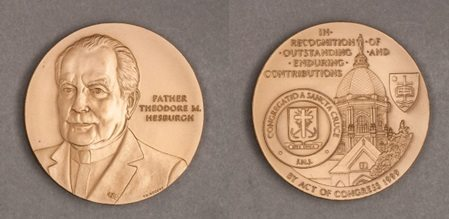
Hesburgh's Congressional Gold Medal

On September 1, 2017, the United States Postal Service (USPS) released a First Class postage stamp honoring Hesburgh in the year of the 100th anniversary of his birthday. The release ceremony was held at the Joyce Center at the University of Notre Dame in Notre Dame, Indiana.

Hesburgh's awards include, among many others:

- Namesake of minor planet 1952 Hesburgh, discovered by the Indiana Asteroid Program (1952)
- Elected to the American Academy of Arts and Sciences (1960)
- Honorary member of the Austrian Catholic fraternity KÖHV Alpenland (1961)
- Presidential Medal of Freedom (1964)
- Alexander Meiklejohn Award (1970) from the American Association of University Professors
- Elected to the American Philosophical Society (1974)
- The Award for Greatest Public Service Benefiting the Disadvantaged, an annual award presented by Jefferson Awards (1976)
- Sylvanus Thayer Award from the United States Military Academy (1980)
- F. Sadlier Dinger Award by educational publisher William H. Sadlier, Inc. in recognition of his outstanding contributions to the ministry of religious education in America. (1982)
- Public Welfare Medal from the National Academy of Sciences (1984)
- Elected to the United States National Academy of Sciences (1984)
- Four Freedoms Award for the Freedom of Worship (1993) from the Roosevelt Institute
- Namesake of the TIAA–CREF's Hesburgh Award (1993)
- Blessed are the Peacemakers Award from Catholic Theological Union (1998)
- Indiana Living Legend (2001) award from the Indiana Historical Society
- NCAA Gerald R. Ford Award (2004 inaugural recipient) for leadership in intercollegiate athletics
- Awarded the Sagamore of the Wabash by the Governor of Indiana Mitch Daniels in 2006.
- Honorary U.S. Navy chaplain (2013)

=== World records ===
In a flight that took place on February 28, 1979, Hesburgh, one of a very few number of civilians to ride in a Lockheed SR-71 Blackbird, flew at Mach 3.35 (about 2,200 miles per hour) as a favor owed to him by President Jimmy Carter.

In 1982, after receiving his ninetieth honorary degree, Hesburgh's name was added to the Guinness Book of World Records as the individual with the "Most Honorary Degrees." At his death, he had received 150 honorary degrees.

== Honorary degrees ==
With 150 honorary degrees, Hesburgh is the person with the most honorary degrees in history. These include:

Location	Date	School	Degree
New York	1954	Le Moyne College	
Illinois	1955	Bradley University	
Chile	1956	Pontifical Catholic University of Chile	
Kansas	1958	St. Benedict's College	
Pennsylvania	1958	Villanova University	
New Hampshire	1958	Dartmouth College	
Rhode Island	1960	University of Rhode Island	
New York	1961	Columbia University	
New Jersey	1961	Princeton University	Doctor of Laws (LL.D.)
Massachusetts	1962	Brandeis University	Doctor of Laws (LL.D.)
Indiana	1962	Indiana University	Doctor of Laws (LL.D.)
Illinois	1963	Northwestern University	Doctor of Laws (LL.D.)
Pennsylvania	1963	Lafayette College	Doctor of Laws (LL.D.)
Austria	1965	University of Vienna	Honorary Citizen
California	1965	University of California Los Angeles	
Philippines	1965	Saint Louis University	
Washington	1965	Gonzaga University	
Pennsylvania	1965	Temple University	Doctor of Laws (LL.D.)
Quebec	1965	Université de Montréal	
Illinois	1966	University of Illinois	Doctor of Laws (LL.D.)
Georgia (U.S. state)	1966	Atlanta University	
Indiana	1966	Wabash College	
New York	1967	Fordham University	
Indiana	1967	Manchester University	
Indiana	1967	Valparaiso University	
Rhode Island	1968	Providence College	
California	1968	University of Southern California	
Michigan	1968	Michigan State University	Doctor of Laws (LL.D.)
Indiana	1969	Saint Mary's College	
Missouri	1969	Saint Louis University	
District of Columbia	1969	The Catholic University of America	Doctor of Humane Letters (DHL)
Illinois	1970	Loyola University	
Indiana	1970	Anderson College	Doctor of Humane Letters (DHL)
New York	1970	State University of New York	
Utah	1970	Utah State University	Doctor of Arts (HD)
Pennsylvania	1971	Lehigh University	
Connecticut	1971	Yale University	Doctor of Laws (LL.D.)
Pennsylvania	1972	King's College	
Massachusetts	1972	Stonehill College	
Michigan	1972	Alma College	
New York	1973	Syracuse University	Doctor of Humane Letters (DHL)
New York	1973	Marymount College	
New York	1973	Hobart and William Smith Colleges	
Ohio	1973	Hebrew Union College	
Massachusetts	1973	Harvard University	
Colorado	1974	Regis College	
Pennsylvania	1974	Lincoln University	
Massachusetts	1974	Tufts University	Doctor of Laws (LL.D.)
Tennessee	1974	The University of the South	
Oregon	1975	University of Portland	Doctor of Humane Letters (DHL)
Connecticut	1975	Fairfield University	Doctor of Public Service
North Carolina	1976	Davidson College	
New York	1976	College of New Rochelle	
Colorado	1976	University of Denver	
Wisconsin	1976	Beloit College	Doctor of Humane Letters (DHL)
Pennsylvania	1977	Dickinson College	Doctor of Sacred Theology (STD)
District of Columbia	1977	Georgetown University	
New York	1977	Queens College	
Quebec	1977	Laval University	
Belgium	1978	Katholieke Universiteit Leuven	
South Carolina	1978	University of South Carolina	
Pennsylvania	1978	University of Pennsylvania	Doctor of Laws (LL.D.)
Belgium	1978	Université catholique de Louvain	
Pennsylvania	1978	Duquesne University	
Nova Scotia	1978	St. Francis Xavier University	
Indiana	1979	University of Evansville	
Michigan	1979	Albion College	
Utah	1979	University of Utah	Doctor of Humane Letters (DHL)
Massachusetts	1979	Assumption College	
Virginia	1980	College of William and Mary	Doctor of Humane Letters (DHL)
Maryland	1980	Johns Hopkins University	Doctor of Humane Letters (DHL)
New Jersey	1980	Seton Hall University	
Alabama	1980	Tuskegee Institute	
New York	1980	Rensselaer Polytechnic Institute	
California	1980	University of San Diego	
Texas	1980	University of the Incarnate Word	Doctor of Humane Letters (DHL)
New York	1981	St. John Fisher College	
Washington	1981	Seattle University	
Ohio	1981	University of Toledo	Doctor of Laws (LL.D.)
Iowa	1981	St. Ambrose University	
Pennsylvania	1981	University of Scranton	
Ohio	1981	University of Cincinnati	Doctor of Letters (D.Litt.)
Michigan	1981	University of Michigan	Doctor of Laws (LL.D.)
Michigan	1981	Hope College	Doctor of Humane Letters (DHL)
Brazil	1981	University of Brasília	
New York	1982	New York University	
Indiana	1982	Indiana State University	
Michigan	1982	Madonna College	
California	1982	Loyola Marymount University	
Pennsylvania	1982	Hahnemann Medical College and Hospital	
Michigan	1982	Kalamazoo College	Doctor of Humane Letters (DHL)
Colorado	1982	Loretto Heights College	
Dominican Republic	1982	Pontificia Universidad Católica Madre y Maestra	
Thailand	1983	Ramkhamhaeng University	This Degree was Received In Absentia.
Indiana	1983	Saint Joseph's College	
New Jersey	1983	Rider College	
New York	1983	Colgate University	
New Jersey	1983	Immaculate Conception Seminary	
Florida	1984	St. Leo College	
West Virginia	1984	West Virginia Wesleyan College	
Indiana	1984	University of Notre Dame	
Montana	1985	Carroll College	
Ohio	1985	College of Mount St. Joseph	
Pennsylvania	1985	Holy Family College	
North Carolina	1985	Duke University	Doctor of Humane Letters (DHL)
Tennessee	1985	Christian Brothers College	
New Brunswick	1985	St. Thomas University	
Ohio	1985	Walsh College	
Iowa	1986	Briar Cliff College	
Michigan	1986	Aquinas College	Doctor of Laws (LL.D.)
Nebraska	1986	University of Nebraska–Lincoln	Doctor of Laws (LL.D.)
Pennsylvania	1987	University of Pittsburgh	
Guatemala	1987	Universidad Francisco Marroquín	
Malta	1988	University of Malta	
Missouri	1988	Rockhurst College	
West Virginia	1989	Wheeling Jesuit College	
Louisiana	1989	Loyola University	
Maryland	1989	Mount Saint Mary's College	
Rhode Island	1989	Brown University	
Iowa	1990	Loras College	
Ohio	1990	Defiance College	
Minnesota	1990	St. Olaf College	
District of Columbia	1991	George Washington University	Doctor of Public Service
Louisiana	1991	Our Lady of Holy Cross College	
Pennsylvania	1992	Gannon University	
Iowa	1993	Mount Mercy College	
New Hampshire	1993	Notre Dame College	
North Carolina	1993	Wake Forest University	Doctor of Humane Letters (DHL)
Indiana	1994	Marian College	
Missouri	1994	Avila College	
Illinois	1995	North Park College	
Pennsylvania	1996	Saint Vincent College	
Illinois	1996	University of St. Francis	Doctor of Laws (LL.D.)
Connecticut	1996	Albertus Magnus College	Doctor of Humane Letters (DHL)
Australia	1997	University of Notre Dame Australia	
New York	1997	The College of Saint Rose	
Kentucky	1998	University of Kentucky	Doctor of Letters (D.Litt.)
New York	1998	Touro College Law Center	
Florida	1998	Barry University	
New York	1999	State University of New York Polytechnic Institute	
Connecticut	1999	Connecticut College	
Indiana	2000	University of Saint Francis	
Indiana	2000	Holy Cross College	
New Jersey	2000	Saint Peter's College	
North Carolina	2000	North Carolina State University	Doctor of Humane Letters (DHL)
Texas	2001	St. Edward's University	
New Jersey	2001	Georgian Court College	
Ohio	2002	Ohio State University	Doctor of Humane Letters (DHL)
Indiana	2002	Ivy Tech State College	
California	2002	University of San Diego	

== See also ==
- Land O'Lakes Statement, 1967 statement calling for academic independence from Church control
- George Nauman Shuster, assistant to Hesburgh

Awards and achievements
Preceded by Krishna Menon	Cover of Time magazine February 9, 1962	Succeeded by Robert Kennedy
Preceded by Mina Rees	Public Welfare Medal; 1984	Succeeded by Isidor Isaac Rabi
Educational offices
Preceded by John J. Cavanaugh	President of the University of Notre Dame; 1952–1987	Succeeded by Edward Malloy
Preceded by	President of the Harvard Board of Overseers; 1994–1996	Succeeded by Renee M. Landers
Political offices
Preceded by John A. Hannah	Chairman of the United States Commission on Civil Rights; 1969–1972	Succeeded by J. Stephen Horn (Acting)
Non-profit organization positions
Preceded by Cyrus Vance	Chairman of the Rockefeller Foundation; 1977—1982	Succeeded by Clifton R. Wharton Jr.
