= Ex corde Ecclesiae =

1990 apostolic constitution of the Catholic Church

Ex corde Ecclesiae (English: From the heart of the Church) is an apostolic constitution issued by Pope John Paul II regarding Catholic colleges and universities. Promulgated on 15 August 1990 and intended to become effective in the academic year starting in 1991, its aim was to define and refine the Catholicism of Catholic institutions of higher education.

Institutions newly claiming to be Catholic would require affirmation from "the Holy See, by an Episcopal Conference or another Assembly of Catholic hierarchy, or by a diocesan bishop". Institutions currently claiming to be Catholic are considered Catholic, unless declared otherwise by the same. The document cites canon 810 of the 1983 Code of Canon Law, which instructs Catholic educational facilities to respect norms established by local bishops. Ex corde underscores the authority of bishops and mentions that canon law (canon 812) requires all teachers of theology, in Catholic colleges and universities, to have the mandate of the local ecclesiastical authority (normally the local bishop).

The apostolic constitution was understood as a rebuttal to the Land O'Lakes Statement, a 1967 position paper composed by a group of American Catholic universities which called for academic freedom and institutional autonomy from the Catholic hierarchy.

== Contents ==
- Introduction
- Part 1 - Identity and Mission
- Part 2 - General Norms
- Transitional Norms
- Conclusion

== Role of theology ==
- "Theology plays a particularly important role in the search for a synthesis of knowledge as well as in the dialogue between faith and reason. It serves all other disciplines in their search for meaning... Because of its specific importance among the academic disciplines, every Catholic University should have a faculty, or at least a chair, of theology" (Ex Corde Ecclesiae §19)

== Impact ==
A number of Catholic universities started offering programs in Catholic studies as a response to the encyclical. For example, the Center for Catholic Studies at the University of St. Thomas in Minnesota was founded in 1992.

== See also ==
- Divini illius Magistri
- Gravissimum educationis
- Cardinal Newman Society, support organization in the United States
- Pontifical Catholic University of Peru
