= These Amazing Shadows =

- Theatrical poster by Brian Oakes
- Directed by: Paul Mariano; Kurt Norton
- Written by: Kurt Norton; Paul Mariano; Doug Blush
- Produced by: Christine O'Malley
- Starring: Christopher Nolan; John Waters; Barbara Kopple; Tim Roth; John Lasseter; Wayne Wang; Julie Dash
- Cinematography: Frazer Bradshaw
- Edited by: Doug Blush; Alex Calleros
- Music by: Peter Golub
- Production company: Gravitas Docufilms
- Distributed by: Sundance Selects
- Release date: January 22, 2011 (Sundance)
- Running time: 88 minutes
- Country: United States
- Language: English

These Amazing Shadows is a 2011 documentary film which tells the history and importance of the National Film Registry, a roll call of American cinema treasures that reflects the diversity of film, and indeed the American experience itself.

The documentary was directed by Paul Mariano and Kurt Norton and was an official selection of the 2011 Sundance Film Festival in the Documentary Premieres category.

These Amazing Shadows is distributed under the Independent Film Channel (IFC) brand, Sundance Selects, and was broadcast on the American television PBS series, Independent Lens, on December 29, 2011.

== Cast ==
- Christopher Nolan, director
- Rob Reiner, director
- Barbara Kopple, director
- John Waters, director
- Leonard Maltin, critic and author
- Julie Dash, director
- John Lasseter, director
- George Takei, actor
- Tim Roth, actor
- Peter Coyote, actor
- John Singleton, director
- Gale Anne Hurd, producer
- Wayne Wang, director
- Steve James, director
- Robin Blaetz, Chair of Film Studies, Mount Holyoke College
- John Ptak, producer
- Nina Paley, animator
- Debbie Reynolds, actress
- Robert Rosen, retired dean of the UCLA School of Theater, Film and Television
- James Schamus, producer
- James H. Billington, The Librarian of Congress
- Rick Prelinger, archivist
- Patrick Loughney, Chief, Library of Congress Packard Campus for Audio-Visual Conservation
- George Willeman, Nitrate Vault Manager, Library of Congress Packard Campus for Audio-Visual Conservation
- Stephen C. Leggett, coordinator, National Film Registry of the Library of Congress
- Liz Stanley, archivist, Library of Congress Packard Campus for Audio-Visual Conservation
- Jennifer Horne, Associate Professor, The Catholic University of America
- Caleb Deschanel, cinematographer
- Zooey Deschanel, actress
- Kevin Yost, editor
- Stephen Peck, director, USVETS
- Mick LaSalle, critic and author
- Michael Smith, director, American Indian Film Festival
- Jan-Christopher Horak, director, UCLA Film and Television Archive
- Jeff Adachi, filmmaker
- Arlene Damron, daughter of filmmaker Dave Tatsuno
- Jay Carr, critic and author
- Anthony Slide, historian and author
- Del Reisman, writer
- Jennifer Hagar, animator
- Robert Harris, film restorer
- Allen Daviau, cinematographer
- Martin Cohen, head of post-production for Paramount Studios
- Amy Heckerling, director
- Antonia Lant, professor, New York University
- Barry Jenkins, director
- Heather Linville, preservationist, The Academy Film Archive
- John Magary, director
- Roger Mayer, retired studio executive
- Eric J. Schwartz, attorney
- Betsy McLane, professor and author
- Farran Nehme, writer
- Jennifer Phang, director
- Paul Schrader, writer and director
- Shelly Stamp, professor, University of California, Santa Cruz
- Jan Yarbrough, colorist, Warner MPI
- Amanda Wyss, actress

== Production ==
These Amazing Shadows was filmed in New York City, San Francisco, California, Culpeper, Virginia, Los Angeles, California and Washington, District of Columbia. Paul Mariano, Kurt Norton and Christine O'Malley are the producers of the documentary.

Graphic design and motion graphics by Brian Oakes of New York City. Oakes was assisted by motion graphics artist Natella Kataev. Brian Oakes directed, JIM: The James Foley Story (2016).

Producer Christine O'Malley (with husband Patrick Creadon) credits include the documentaries Wordplay (2006), I.O.U.S.A. (2008), If You Build It (2014), and All Work No Play (2015).

Cinematographer Frazer Bradshaw director of photography credits include the documentary, Babies and Informant. Bradshaw directed, Everything Strange and New, which was nominated for a 2011 Independent Spirit Awards for Best First Feature and a 2009 Gotham Awards for Breakthrough Director; won the 2009 CineVision Award, 2009 Marlon Riggs Award and 2009 San Francisco International Film Festival FIPRESCI Prize.

Co-editor Doug Blush. His editing credits include the Best Documentary Oscar nominee The Invisible War (2012), Best Documentary Oscar-winning Twenty Feet from Stardom (2013), and Bes Original Song nominee The Hunting Ground (2015).

Co-editor Alex Calleros is part owner of the film production company, Finite Films, along with Michael Tucker and Ryan McDuffie. Calleros was the lead editor on the documentary, Being George Clooney (2016).

Color grading by Chris Martin of SpyPost, San Francisco, California.

Post production supervisor by Matt Radecki of Different by Design, Los Angeles, California.

Legal services by Michael C. Donaldson of Donaldson & Callif, Los Angeles, California.

Sound re-recording by Laurence A. Ellis, C.A.S. of MaxPost, Los Angeles, California.

These Amazing Shadows trailer was cut by Stephen Garrett of Kinetic Trailers of New York City.

Production Stills Gallery
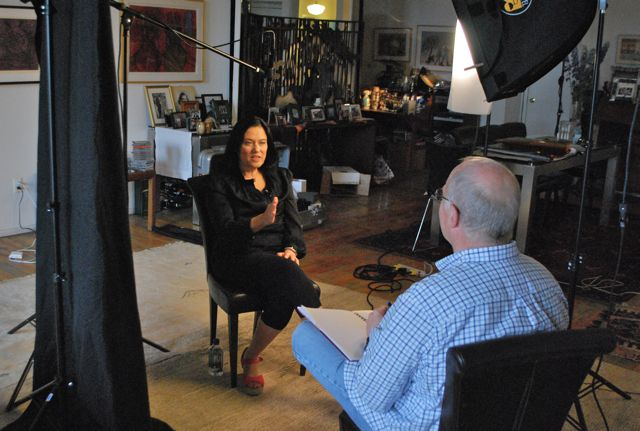
Barbara Kopple, director of Harlan County, USA, is interviewed by Paul Mariano. Barbara is the winner of two Oscars for Best Documentary. Harlan County, USA was selected to the National Film Registry in 1990.

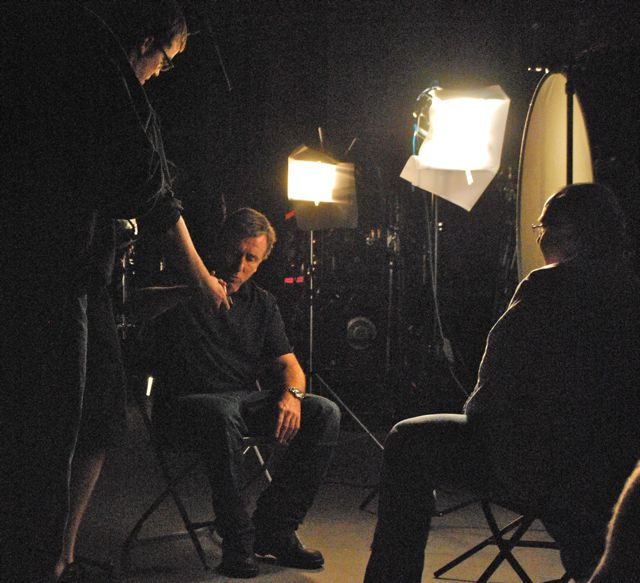
Tim Roth (center), star of Lie to Me, is wired for sound by PA Travis Rexroat while co-director Paul Mariano looks on.

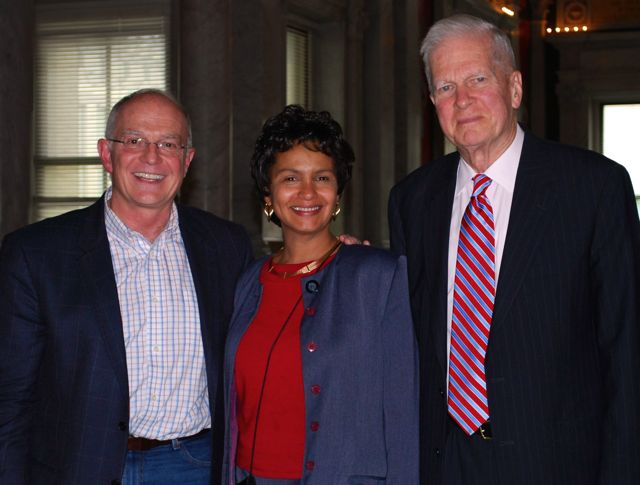
(right to left) Past Librarian of Congress James H. Billington, Sheryl Cannady, Library of Congress Media Relations and Paul Mariano, co-director of These Amazing Shadows.

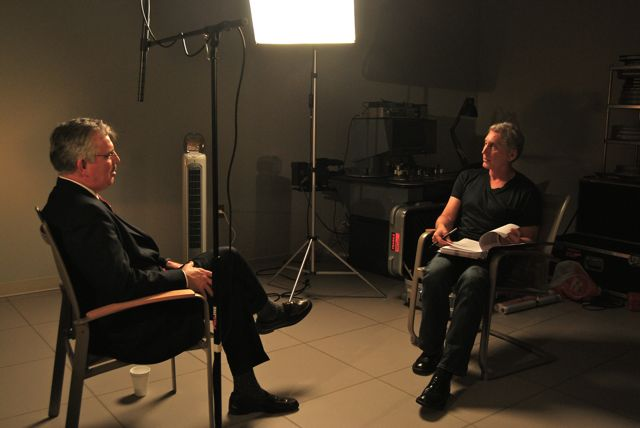
Patrick Loughney, Chief of the Library of Congress Packard Campus for Audio-Visual Conservation in Culpeper, Virginia is interviewed by These Amazing Shadows co-director Kurt Norton.

== Music ==
These Amazing Shadows: Music from the Documentary

Film score by Peter Golub
- Released: May 10, 2011
- Genre: Soundtrack
- Length: 30:00
- Label: Lakeshore Records

Peter Golub (Countdown to Zero) scored These Amazing Shadows during the fall of 2010. The music was performed by the City of Prague Philharmonic Orchestra (conducted byRichard Hein) and recorded at the Smecky Studios in Prague, Czech Republic.

The score was orchestrated by Peter Golub and Philip Klein, edited by Scott Johnson, contracted by Ted Hinkley, recorded by Michael Pekarek and the music preparation was done by Nicholas Greer. Mr. Golub was assisted in Prague by Czech translator, Staniaslave Vomacko.

=== Track listing ===
All tracks written and composed by Peter Golub.

These Amazing Shadows: Music from the Motion Picture
No.	Title	Length
1.	"Main Titles"	2:04
2.	"Protecting Our Films"	1:45
3.	"Creating the National Film Registry"	0:52
4.	"Preserving Our Cultural Heritage"	1:38
5.	"Into West Side Story"	0:32
6.	"To Kill a Mockingbird Montage"	1:36
7.	"These Amazing Shadows"	2:05
8.	"The Land of Nitrate"	0:40
9.	"Dorothy Opens the Door"	0:40
10.	"2001 And Beyond"	0:52
11.	"With Every Laugh, A Tear"	1:09
12.	"Japanese Internment during WWII"	2:59
13.	"The Kennedy Assassination"	0:51
14.	"Gender Bias"	0:33
15.	"Vision of Women Directors"	1:13
16.	"Back to the Future Montage"	0:59
17.	"Harlan County Montage"	2:30
18.	"Race and Politics"	0:40
19.	"The Danger of Cinema"	0:43
20.	"Exiles"	0:53
21.	"Race Issues"	0:53
22.	"The Effect of War"	0:56
23.	"Final Montage: The Power of Movies"	4:08
Total length:		31:11

== Festival Screenings ==
- Official Selection 2011 Sundance Film Festival
- Official Selection 2011 Boulder International Film Festival – February 2011
- Official Selection 2011 Ashland Independent Film Festival – April 2011
- Official Documentary Competition 2011 Cleveland International Film Festival – March 2011
- Official Selection 2011 Newport Beach Film Festival – April 2011
- Official Selection 2011 Tiburon International Film Festival – April 2011
- Official Selection 2011 Seattle International Film Festival – May 2011
- Official Selection 2011 Indianapolis International Film Festival - July 2011
- Official Selection 2011 RiverRun International Film Festival - April 2011
- Official Selection 2011 Stony Brook Film Festival - July 2011
- Official Selection 2011 White Sands International Film Festival - August 2011
- Official Selection 2011 Aspen Filmfest - September 2011
- Official Selection 2011 Port Townsend Film Festival - September 2011
- Official Selection 2011 Louisville's International Festival of Film - October 2011
- Official Selection 2011 Tacoma Film Festival - October 2011
- Official Selection 2011 Duke City DocFest - October 2011
- Official Selection 2011 Heartland Film Festival - November 2011
- Official Selection 2011 Lucerne International Film Festival - October 2011
- Official Selection 2011 Savannah Film Festival - October 2011
- Official Selection 2011 Indie Memphis Film Festival - November 2011
- Official Selection 2011 Prescott Film Festival - November 2011
- Official Selection 2011 Inverness Film Festival - November 2011
- Official Selection 2011 St. Louis International Film Festival - November 2011
- Official Selection 30th International Festival of Films on Art - March 2012
- Official Selection 2012 Mendocino Film Festival - June 2012
- Official Selection 2012 Transatlantyk - Poznan International Film and Music Festival - August 2012

== Awards ==
- CINE Golden Eagle Award - December 2011
- Best Documentary Savannah Film Festival 2011 - December 2011
- Best Documentary Louisville's International Festival of Film 2011 - December 2011

== Reception ==
On review aggregator Rotten Tomatoes, the film holds a 75% approval rating based on 12 reviews, with an average rating of 7.1/10.

David Rooney of The Hollywood Reporter gave the film a positive review, and wrote this "inspiring documentary makes an illuminating case for this vital institution as America’s time capsule and family album."
