= Robert Abbott (director) =

American film director

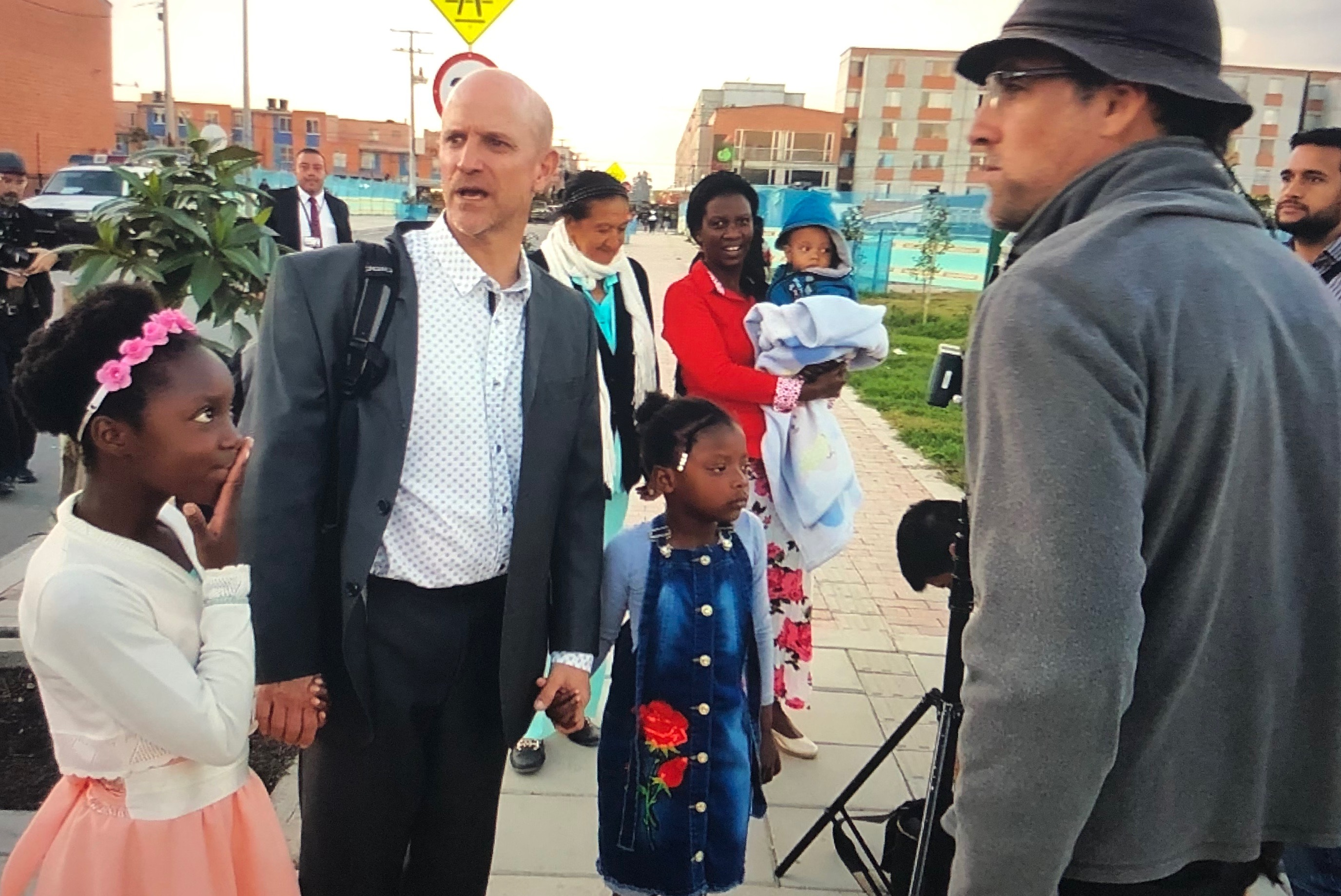
- Abbott in 2018
- Born: August 28, 1964 (age 62)
- Education: Florida State University
- Occupations: Filmmaker and executive producer at Hey Abbott! Entertainment

Robert Abbott (born August 28, 1964) is an American film director and TV producer, known for his work in sports journalism and documentary films. Abbott has worked for CNN and ESPN, before starting Hey Abbott! Entertainment in January 2009. Abbott's most recent work is the 2022 documentary on Eli Broad- the first American businessman to found two Fortune 500 companies in different industries, Eli Broad’s success was defined by keen vision, an appetite for risk-taking and an instinct for strong partners. Abbott also directed a 2018 documentary titled Port of Destiny: Peace. The film focuses on former Colombian President Juan Manuel Santos, the 2016 Nobel Peace Prize winner, and his work in ending the five-decade civil war between far-left rebel group FARC (Revolutionary Armed Forces of Colombia) and the government of Colombia. Prior to Port of Destiny: Peace, he produced, directed, and narrated ESPN's 30 for 30 entitled The Last Days of Knight (2018), where Abbott tells the story of his investigation that led to the 2000 firing of the longtime head coach of Indiana University men's basketball, Bob Knight.

Other projects include ESPN's 30 for 30: Catholics vs. Convicts, ESPN's SportsCentury documentary series, Field of Screams, CNN Special Reports: The Moses Project, ESPN Backstory with Don Van Natta, and the CNN Breaking News Coverage of the 1996 Centennial Olympic Park bombing. In addition to directing and producing, Abbott helped create the television shows ESPN's E:60, ESPN Classic's Top 5 Reasons You Can't Blame..., and SEC Storied. Abbott has won six Emmy Awards in five different categories.

== Education and career ==
Abbott graduated from Florida State University in 1986, earning a degree in communications. After graduation, he began his career at CNN in 1987. It was during his time at CNN that Abbott began his investigation into Indiana University Basketball coach Bob Knight.

Abbott left CNN in 2001 and began working for ESPN, where he remained until 2011. As the network's Coordinating Producer, his team created shows such as E:60, The Top 5 Reasons You Can't Blame..., Who's No. 1? hosted by Stuart Scott, and The Headlines for ESPN25 hosted by Robert Lee (sports announcer). He still works as an Executive Producer / Show-runner for ESPN Backstory with Don Van Natta Jr. In 2009, while still working at ESPN, Abbott launched his own media company, Hey Abbott! Entertainment.

== Filmography ==
Year	Project	Role
1994	Battle of the Sexes (CNN)	Director
1994	The Moses Project (CNN)	Supervising Producer
1994	Field of Screams (CNN)	Producer
2011	ESPN Films - Yes Sir: Jack Nicklaus and the '86 Masters	Coordinating Producer
2011	ESPN Films: Roll Tide War Eagle	Senior Coordinating Producer
2014	An Exile's Home in the Bronx	Executive Producer
2016	ESPN 30 for 30: Catholics vs. Convicts	Executive Producer
2018	ESPN 30 for 30: The Last Days of Knight	Director
2018	Port of Destiny: Peace	Director
2022	Eli Broad Documentary	Director

=== Battle of the Sexes (1994) ===
Abbott directed the 1994 CNN documentary Battle of the Sexes, where Nick Charles took an in depth look at the inequalities between male and female college athletes. It focused on the Auburn University Women's Soccer Team, and their journey to achieve the same equalities and varsity status as the university's male soccer team. The documentary highlighted Title IX, a federal law for equal treatment of sexes, and how many schools, like Auburn, violated it with its grossly unequal treatment of women's sports vs. their male counterparts.

=== The Moses Project (1994) ===
In 1994 Abbott produced the special, The Moses Project, which told the story of 19 Bosnian Junior Olympic basketball players and their two coaches, who were seeking refuge from their war-torn homeland. With the help of Illinois lawyer Jim Minnihan, the boys were granted asylum in the United States where they could live safely and continue their basketball careers. The documentary chronicles their journey, and the obstacles they faced along the way. Some of the players went on to play basketball in college, at top tier universities. The special was well received, and nominated for an Emmy and a CableACE Award for Outstanding News Special or Series.

The film won a gold medal for International TV and Programming at the New York Festivals in 1994, and a Gold Award in 1995 at the Houston International Film Festival.

=== Field of Screams (1994) ===
The CNN Special Field of Screams (released in the fall of 1994) showcases the disturbing confrontations and experiences had by some professional athletes at the hands of obsessed fans. With Jim Huber reporting and Abbott producing, the special interviewed multiple athletes who shared their personal stories of being stalked and harassed. Katarina Witt and Mitch Williams were two of the athletes that were featured in the special.

In an article for Premiere Magazine in July 1996, Robert De Niro spoke about the preparation for his role as a psycho fanatic in The Fan (1996 film). He had watched the CNN Special in order to dive deeper into the mind of the stalker he would be portraying. The film also received a CINE Golden Eagle award in 1995.

=== ESPN Films - Yes Sir: Jack Nicklaus and the '86 Masters (2011) ===
As a senior coordinating producer for ESPN Films’ Yes Sir: Jack Nicklaus and the ‘86 Masters released in 2011, Abbot helped tell the story of Jack Nicklaus's come-from-behind victory. The special was told by Nicklaus himself, his son Jack Nicklaus II (who served as his caddy), and other golfing professionals such as Tiger Woods. At age 46, Nicklaus became the oldest golfer to win the tournament, earning him his 6th coveted green jacket. The documentary dives into the relationship between Nicklaus and his son as they worked together to make history at Augusta.

=== ESPN Films: Roll Tide War Eagle (2011) ===
ESPN Films' Roll Tide War Eagle focuses on the longstanding rivalry between two powerhouse college football teams in Alabama: the Alabama Crimson Tide and Auburn Tigers. The two teams face off once a year in the nationally televised “Iron Bowl”. The documentary looks at the historic rivalry between the two programs, interviewing famous alumni from both schools. The film is available to stream on ESPN+. Abbott worked on the film as senior coordinating producer alongside director Martin Khodabakhsian.

=== An Exile's Home in the Bronx (2014) ===
The film focuses on Irish immigrants living in New York and their desire to stay in touch with their heritage through the national sport of Ireland: Gaelic Football. The immigrants play for the New York Football team and are followed through their journey of competing in the All-Ireland Championship (A 32-team Gaelic Football Tournament). Abbott was Executive Producer for the documentary, which was released in Ireland in 2014.

=== ESPN 30 for 30: Catholics vs. Convicts (2016) ===
Abbott was the executive producer of Patrick Creadon's Catholics vs. Convicts, which documents the 1988 college football game between the Notre Dame Fighting Irish and the Miami Hurricanes and the hype leading up to it. Notre Dame students labeled the University of Miami's team “convicts” creating added tensions and animosity by both teams. The documentary gives student and player accounts during this time, and highlights the widespread media publicity surrounding the game. The special is available to stream on ESPN+. The documentary was nominated for Best Documentary or Nonfiction Series at the 2017 Emmy Awards.

=== ESPN 30 for 30: The Last Days of Knight (2018) ===
In 2018, Abbott partnered with ESPN to direct the 30 for 30 special titled The Last Days of Knight. He expanded on his initial investigation into why three All-American recruits had left Indiana University's basketball team in just two years. The film unravels the unethical actions of head coach Bob Knight and the scandal that led to his eventual dismissal in 2000. Abbott's investigative journalism, at the time of the controversy, was featured in major newspapers and magazines such as the New York Times and Sports Illustrated. The film debuted in 2018 and is available to stream exclusively on ESPN+.

ESPN's 30 for 30 Season 9 was nominated for Outstanding Producer of Non-Fiction Television series at the 30th Producers Guild Awards. The Last Days of Knight was one of only four films made that year for ESPN's 30 for 30.

=== Port of Destiny: Peace (2018) ===
Abbott directed the film Port of Destiny: Peace (2018) telling the story of the former Colombian President and 2016 Nobel Peace Prize winner Juan Manuel Santos, and his hard-fought fight for peace in Colombia. Santos grew up during the decades-long civil war between the Revolutionary Armed Forces of Colombia (FARC), and the Colombian government. Santos would become the Defense Minister of Colombia, and lead the fight against FARC. When Santos was elected president, he changed his approach to one of diplomacy in an attempt to broker peace and end the civil unrest. Although he faced backlash for his change in tactics, Santos achieved an end to the five-decade long war that killed over 250,000 Colombians.

In the film, Abbott and Sellers Easton Media interviewed former UK Prime Minister Tony Blair, former US President Bill Clinton, and former Colombian President Juan Manuel Santos. The documentary received praise, including from Jonathan Powell (former Chief British Negotiator in Northern Ireland) stating, “Port of Destiny brilliantly captures the determination and courage of President Juan Manuel Santos in ending 50 years of civil war in Colombia. This riveting drama shows what it took to end the violence, and the political price Santos had to pay on his way to winning the Nobel Peace Prize."

== Television ==
Year(s)	Title	Role
1989–1992	CNN Baseball	Producer
1989–1992	CNN College Basketball	Producer
1989–1994	NBA Show on CNN & TNT	Producer
1989–1994	Sports Tonight (CNN)	Producer
1989–1994	Sports Late Night (CNN)	Producer
1990	Countdown to Signing Day (SportSouth)	Producer
1990–1993	SportSouth Journal	Producer
1991	Atlanta Braves Exhibition Games (SportSouth)	Producer
1991–2001	Olympic Update (CNN / CNN International)	Creator / Producer
1992	The Sporting Life with Jim Huber (CNN)	Producer
1992–2001	CNN Presents	Producer
1995	The Return of Mike Tyson	Producer
2001–2007	SportsCentury (ESPN)	Coordinating Producer
2003–2004	ESPN 25	Co-Creator / Coordinating Producer
2004	ESPN 25: The Headlines	Co-Creator / Coordinating Producer
2004	ESPN 25: Who's No. 1?	Co-Creator / Coordinating Producer
2005–2007	The Top Five Reasons You Can't Blame... (ESPN Classic)	Creator / Coordinating Producer
2005–2007	All-Time Greatest (ESPN Classic)	Co-Creator / Coordinating Producer
2007	E: 60 (ESPN)	Co-Creator / Coordinating Producer
2007	Missing Link (ESPN)	Creator / Coordinating Producer
2011	SportsCenter (ESPN)	Senior Coordinating Producer
2011	SEC Storied (ESPN)	Co-Creator / Coordinating Producer
2019	Backstory with Don Van Natta Jr. (ESPN)	Co-Creator / Executive Producer / Show-Runner

== Awards ==
Abbott has been awarded six Emmy Awards in five different categories for his work on the following projects:

- 18th Annual News and Documentary Emmy Awards: Outstanding Instant Coverage of a Single Breaking News Story: “Coverage of the Olympic Park Bombing” - CNN
- 22nd Annual Sports Emmy Awards: Outstanding Edited Sports Series / Anthology - SportsCentury
- 29th Annual Sports Emmy Awards: Outstanding New Approaches - Long Form: ESPN.com “Ray of Hope”
- 31st Annual Sports Emmy Awards: Outstanding Long Feature: E:60 “Catfish Hunters”
- 31st Annual Sports Emmy Awards: Outstanding Sports Journalism: E:60 “Wanted: Fugitive”
- 32nd Annual Sports Emmy Awards: Outstanding Long Feature: E:60 “Survival 1”

E:60's “Catfish Hunters” won a National Headliner Award, along with an Edward R. Murrow Award (Radio Television Digital News Association) for Outstanding Sports Journalism. The show won another National Headliner Award in 2011 for its episode “Picking up Butch”, and the episode “Corrective Rape” won a Gold Award at the United Nations Public Information Department-New York Festivals Event. E:60 has also won two Gracie Awards for Outstanding Soft News Feature in 2009 for the episode “Alba Colon” and in 2011 for “A League of Her Own”.

The show was nominated for Sports Emmy awards 26 times between 2007 and 2011. The documentaries The Moses Project and Catholics vs. Convicts were nominated for their own Emmy Awards.

Abbott has also received the following awards: Gold Medal for International TV Programming at the New York Festivals in 1994 (“The Moses Project”), Gold Award in 1995 at the Houston International Film Festival (“The Moses Project”), CINE Golden Eagle award in 1995 (Field of Screams), a gold medal for Sports Reporting at the 2001 National Headliner Awards (Bob Knight Investigation), and a Silver World Medal for 2000 International TV Programming at the New York Festivals (Bob Knight Investigative Report).

== Personal life ==
Robert Abbott grew up in Miami, Florida and attended Florida State University, where he played on the 1983 men's golf team and graduated in 1986. He currently lives in Connecticut with his three sons. William Alton Abbott being one of them.
