= Catholics vs. Convicts (film) =

- Directed by: Patrick Creadon
- Country of origin: United States
- Original language: English

Production
- Producers: Christine O'Malley; Jerry Barca; Robert Abbott; Andy Billman
- Cinematography: Turner Jumonville
- Editor: Nick Andert
- Running time: 102 minutes
- Budget: $1,000,000

Original release
- Network: ESPN
- Release: December 10, 2016

Catholics vs. Convicts is a 2016 documentary film about the October 15, 1988 Notre Dame-Miami football game between the Miami Hurricanes of the University of Miami and the Notre Dame Fighting Irish of Notre Dame.

The documentary is the 87th in ESPN's 30 for 30 series and aired on ESPN following the December 10, 2016 Heisman Award. It premiered to over two million viewers, making it the highest rated 30 for 30 film since 2015.

Catholics vs. Convicts was directed by Patrick Creadon. At the 69th Primetime Emmy Awards, it was one of that season's 30 for 30 films nominated for Outstanding Documentary or Nonfiction Series.

== Background ==
In 1985, a rivalry started between the University of Notre Dame and University of Miami football teams after the Miami Hurricanes beat the Notre Dame Fighting Irish 58–7. This loss marked head coach Gerry Faust's last game at Notre Dame.

The rivalry culminated in a showdown three years later, which was dubbed "Catholics vs. Convicts." The name originated from a t-shirt slogan created by Notre Dame students Joe Fredrick and Michael Caponigro. The slogan played on Notre Dame's Catholic background and the public perception of Miami's players as college football's "bad boys," a reputation that was reinforced by the arrests of a number of Miami players. Both the Notre Dame Fighting Irish and the Miami Hurricanes came into the game undefeated. Cleveland Gary's controversial "phantom fumble" is examined closely in the film. While studying the game the filmmakers re-examined a second close call by the referees which had gone largely unnoticed at the time. Both coaches and several players from the game had never seen the replay, leading many of the subjects to reconsider the outcome of the game. Many sportswriters consider it one of the greatest college football games of all time.

The documentary is partially based on director Patrick Creadon's experience as a Notre Dame undergraduate at the time. Creadon was a senior at Notre Dame in 1988 and knew the students behind the "Catholics vs. Convicts" slogan.

== Cast ==
Creadon went back to interview several of his classmates for the documentary, including Patrick Walsh, his best friend from high school who was involved in the t-shirt scandal, and Tony Rice, the starting quarterback who lived down the hall from them in Dillon Hall. The film also features interviews with head coaches Lou Holtz and Jimmy Johnson; Notre Dame defensive coordinator Barry Alvarez; Notre Dame players Chris Zorich, Pat Eilers, Pat Terrell, and Todd Lyght, and Miami players Steve Walsh, Cleveland Gary, and Leon Searcy, and others.

== Reception ==
Writing for The Wall Street Journal, John Anderson called Catholics vs. Convicts a "gripping gridiron drama." Sporting News ranks the film "among the best" of the 30 for 30 franchise.

== See also ==
- List of American football films
