= MountainA =

American film and TV production company

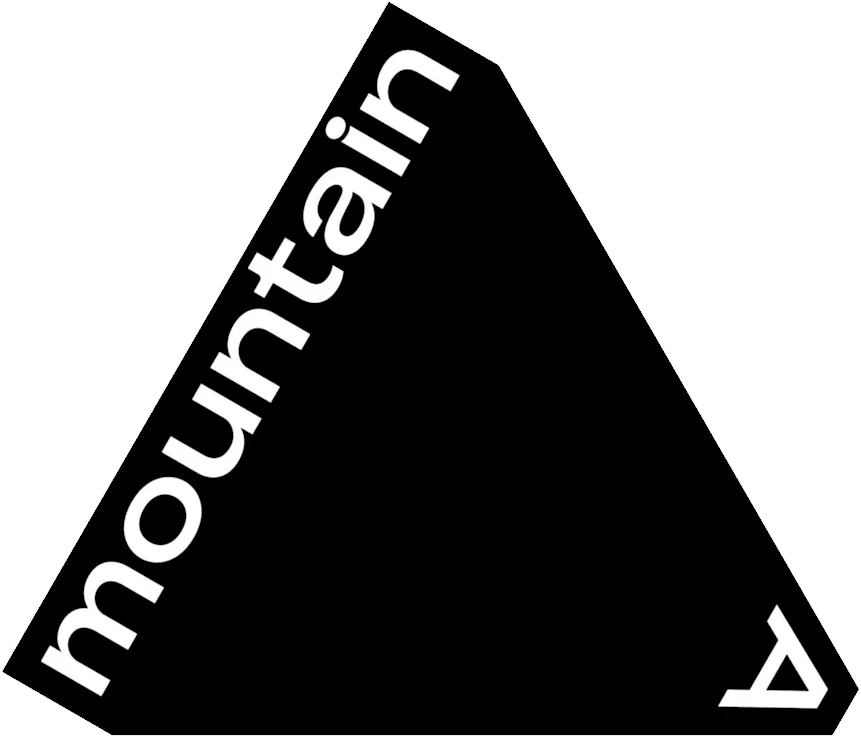
- Type: Private
- Industry: Production company
- Founded: September 4, 2020; 6 years ago
- Founders: Natalie Portman; Sophie Mas
- Headquarters: United States
- Key people: Natalie Portman (Partner); Sophie Mas (Partner)

MountainA is an American film and television production company founded in September 2020 by Israeli-American actress and producer Natalie Portman and French producer Sophie Mas. It is known for producing the films May December (2023) and Arco (2025), and the television series Lady in the Lake (2024).

== History ==
The company was founded on September 4, 2020, by Israeli-born American actress, producer, and director Natalie Portman and French producer and author Sophie Mas. The company gets its name from the Sisyphus myth, Portman and Mas' shared interest in mountains, and the "A" from the first letter of all of Portman and Mas' children's names.

In March 2021, the company entered a exclusive multi-year first look television production deal with Apple Inc.

== Filmography ==
=== Film ===
Year	Title	Director	Gross (worldwide)	Notes	Ref.
2023	May December	Todd Haynes	$5.3 million	with Gloria Sanchez Productions, Killer Films, Taylor & Dodge, and Project Infinity	
2025	Arco	Ugo Bienvenu	$5.2 million	with Remembers, France 3 Cinéma, Fit Via Vi Film Productions, and Sons of Rigor	
2025	Carol & Joy	Nathan Silver	—N/a	Short film with Dweck Productions	
2026	The Gallerist	Cathy Yan	TBA	with Concordia Studio, Slow Pony, and MRC	

==== Upcoming ====
- Good Sex (2026; with Good Thing Going Productions)

==== In development ====
- Pumping Black (with Shiny Penny and Anton)

=== Television ===
Year	Title	Network	Notes	Ref.
2023	Angel City	HBO Max	with Little Monster Films, O'Malley Creadon Productions, and HBO Sports Documentaries	
2024	Lady in the Lake	Apple TV+	with Bad Wolf America, Crazyrose, Zusa, and Fifth Season	
