= Two Minds (disambiguation) =

Two Minds may refer to:

- "Two Minds", a 2015 song by Nero
- Two Minds, a 2010 EP by Ngaiire
- "Two Minds", a 1996 song by Tall Dwarfs from Stumpy

== See also ==
- In Two Minds, a television play by David Mercer
- Of Two Minds (disambiguation)
- Problem of other minds, a philosophical problem of whether other minds exist
