= All Work All Play =

- Directed by: Patrick Creadon
- Produced by: Christine O'Malley; John Kessler
- Edited by: Nick Andert; Daniel J. Clark
- Music by: Peter Golub
- Release date: 2015

All Work All Play is a 2015 documentary film directed by Patrick Creadon. It explores the growing esports industry and follows professional gamers as they compete in the Electronic Sports League's 2014 Intel Extreme Masters World Championship.

The documentary was screened as a "work in progress" at the 2015 Tribeca Film Festival. To commemorate its official release, Fathom Events and By Experience broadcast two special screenings of the film, each of which was followed by a panel discussion with the creators and cast. For All Work All Play's international theatrical release, Fathom Events and By Experience released the film in 1,200 theaters worldwide.

== Synopsis ==
The documentary primarily focuses on professional League of Legends players as they vie for spots at the Intel Extreme Masters World Championship, an annual esports competition held in Katowice, Poland. The film also follows Michal "Carmac" Blicharz, the managing director of ESL, and details his ascension from gaming enthusiast to organizer of the IEM Championship.

== Cast ==
Creadon interviewed several professional gaming teams for the film, including American teams Cloud9 and Team SoloMid and South Korean team GE Tigers.
