= Angel City (miniseries) =

2023 American HBO documentary series about Angel City FC

- Genre: Documentary; Sports
- Directed by: Arlene Nelson
- Country of origin: United States
- Original language: English
- No. of seasons: 1
- No. of episodes: 3

Production
- Producers: Natalie Portman; Jimmy Chin; Elizabeth Chai Vasarhelyi; Christine O'Malley; Sophie Mas; Anna Barnes
- Running time: 60 minutes
- Production company: MountainA

Original release
- Network: HBO Max
- Release: May 16, 2023

Angel City is an American documentary miniseries that follows the inaugural season of Angel City FC, Los Angeles' first professional women's soccer team since the closure of the Los Angeles Sol in 2010. The series was produced for HBO Max and was released on May 16, 2023. It is directed by Arlene Nelson, and is executive produced by Elizabeth Chai Vasarhelyi, Jimmy Chin, Sophie Mas, Anna Barnes, and Christine O’Malley. Natalie Portman, who is one of the co-founders of Angel FC, also serves as an executive producer for the series.
