= Neal Baer =

American screenwriter (born 1955)

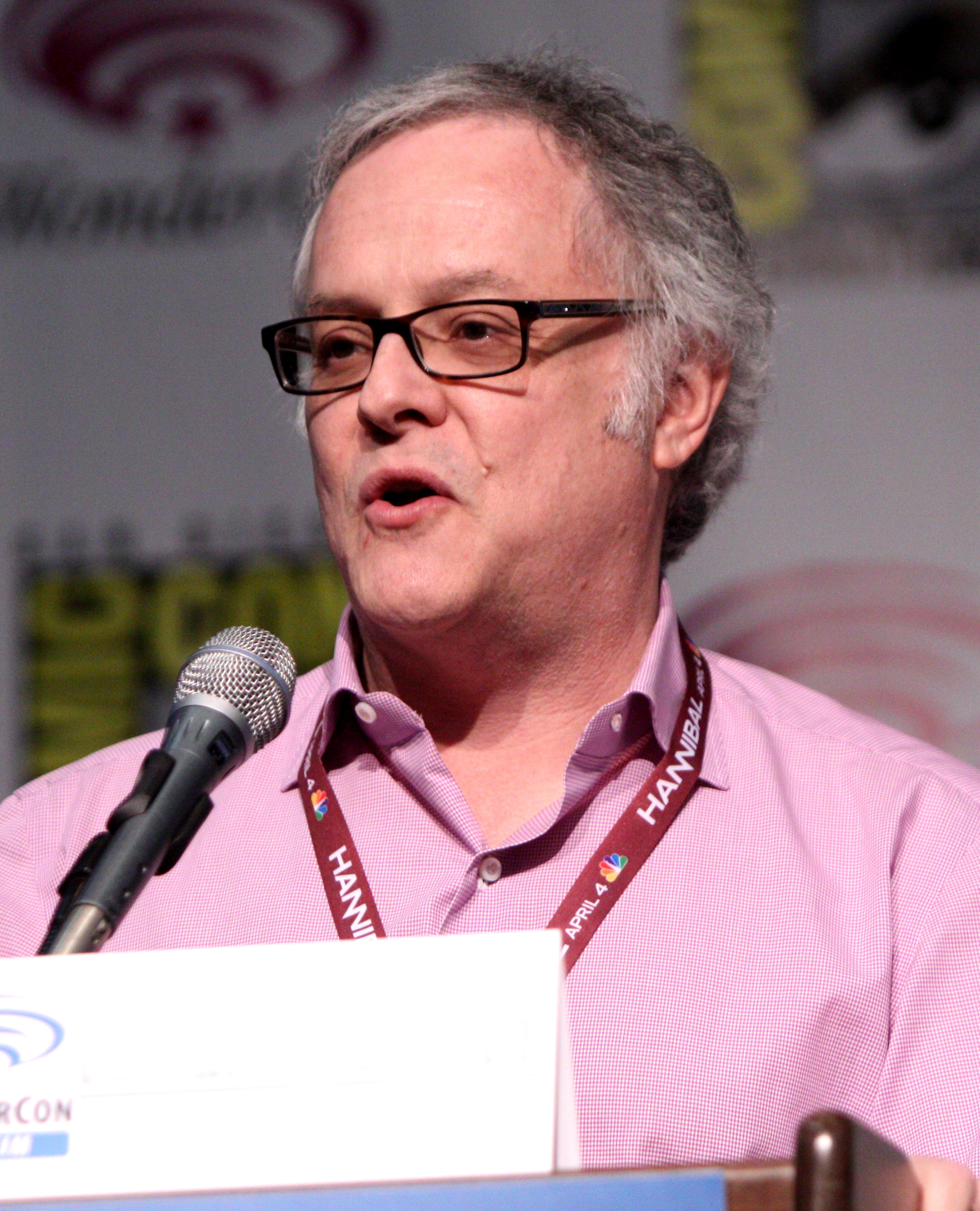
- Baer in 2013
- Born: 1955 (age 70–71); Denver, Colorado, U.S.
- Education: Colorado College (BA); American Film Institute (MFA); Harvard University (MD)
- Occupations: Pediatrician, television writer, producer
- Years active: 1989–present
- Spouse: Gerrie Smith (div. 2013) Brandon Weiss (m. 2022, separated)
- Children: 1

Neal Baer (/bɛɹ/ BEAR; born 1955) is an American pediatrician and television writer and producer. He is best known for his work on the television shows Designated Survivor, ER and Law & Order: Special Victims Unit.

== Early life and education ==
Baer was born in 1955. His father, Sylvan, was a surgeon and his mother was active politically. He graduated from Cherry Creek High School in 1973 and later graduated magna cum laude with a B.A. in political science from Colorado College. Baer attended the AFI Conservatory as a directing fellow in 1983. Baer studied for a master's degree from the Harvard Graduate School of Arts and Sciences in Sociology and focused on family policy. Baer attended Harvard Medical School from 1991 to 1996. The final part of his training overlapped with his work in television, and he completed his degree by undertaking electives at UCLA and returning to Harvard during breaks in production.

Baer graduated from Harvard Medical School and completed his internship in Pediatrics at Children's Hospital Los Angeles. He received the Jerry L. Pettis Memorial Scholarship from the American Medical Association as the most outstanding medical student who has contributed to promoting a better understanding of medicine in the media. He balanced completing his medical internship with working in television, again practicing medicine in breaks in filming including working as a resident at Children's Hospital in December 1997 and March, April, and May 1998.

Baer also holds a master's degree from the Harvard Graduate School of Education. In 2000, he received an honorary Doctor of Laws from Colorado College.

== Career ==
=== Academic career ===
Baer has written extensively on adolescent health issues for Scholastic Magazine, covering such topics as teen pregnancy, AIDS, drug and alcohol abuse, and nutrition. Baer taught elementary school in Colorado and also worked as a research associate at USC Medical School, where he focused on drug and alcohol abuse prevention. The American Association for the Advancement of Science selected him as a Mass Media Fellow. In 2003, he was honored by Physicians for Social Responsibility, Lupus L.A., and the Media Project.

Baer is on the boards of many organizations related to health care, including the Venice Family Clinic, RAND Health, Children Now, the Huckleberry Fund of Children's Hospital Los Angeles, and the National Organization on Fetal Alcohol Syndrome. Baer is a member of the Board of Associates at the Whitehead Institute for Biomedical Research. He is currently engaged in work to improve the visibility of social determinants of health in media.

=== Television career ===
Baer began his work in television by writing and directing an ABC Afterschool Special entitled "Private Affairs". The program dealt with sexually transmitted diseases, and was selected by The Association of Women in Film and Television as the Best Children's Drama of the Year. In January 1988, Baer would appear as a contestant on episode #182 of Classic Concentration with Alex Trebek where he mentions writing and selling a script for "a TV show for kids."

Baer was hired by writer and producer John Wells to write for drama series China Beach. The series focused on nurses in Vietnam and Baer was nominated for a Writers Guild of America Award for Best Screenplay in Episodic Drama his work on the episode "Warriors". During this time, Baer prepared a film script treatment for Paramount called The Lost Mariner, based on a story from the book The Man Who Mistook His Wife for a Hat by Oliver Sacks, but the project was not produced.

Baer was hired by John Wells again as a staff writer for the first season of ER. He contributed directly to four episodes and his medical experience informed other storylines. He became a story editor for the second season, taking responsibility for compiling scripts and developing the medical storylines. As a story editor, Baer worked alongside fellow medical professional Lance Gentile. Baer remained a regular writer and contributed scripts for the episodes "Hell and High Water" and "The Match". Baer and Gentile were promoted to executive story editors by the end of the season. Baer was nominated for an Emmy Award for Outstanding Writing for a Drama Series at the 1996 awards for his work on "Hell and High Water".

Baer became a co-producer on the third season of ER and wrote a further four episodes. The third season was nominated for a Primetime Emmy Award for Outstanding Drama Series at the 1997 awards. The producers shared the nomination for their work on the season. Baer was personally nominated for a second Emmy Award for Outstanding Writing for a Drama Series for his work on the episode "Whose Appy Now?". He was also nominated a second Writers Guild of America award for Best Screenplay in Episodic Drama for the same episode in at the 1998 ceremony.

Baer was promoted to producer for the fourth season and wrote two more episodes. The season was again nominated for the Emmy Award for Outstanding Drama Series at the 1998 awards and Baer shared the nomination for a second time.

Baer was promoted again to supervising producer for the fifth season. He was responsible for writing a two more episodes, continuing to develop medical storylines for all episodes, and supervising other aspects of production including casting, design, directing, and editing. Baer was also responsible for answering mail relating to the medical aspects of the series and for developing projects that drew on ER to promote public health including a series of news segments covering issues related to the series. The fifth season was also nominated for the Emmy Award for Outstanding Drama Series at the 1999 awards and Baer shared the nomination for a third time.

Baer became a co-executive producer for the sixth season of ER and wrote a further three episodes. The sixth season was also nominated for the Emmy Award for Outstanding Drama Series at the 2000 awards and Baer shared the nomination for a fourth time.

Baer was promoted to executive producer for the seventh season of ER and wrote one more episode. The seventh season was also nominated for the Emmy Award for Outstanding Drama Series at the 2001 awards, marking Baer's fifth consecutive nomination for the award. Baer left ER following the seventh season, having been a producer for five seasons and with 18 episodes as a writer.

Following his departure from ER, Baer became executive producer and showrunner for Law & Order: Special Victims Unit from the second season until departing after 12th season to move to CBS Television Studios.

Baer has written the pilot episode of two unproduced television series; The Edge for CBS and Outreach for the WB Network. Baer served as a writer and producer for the pilot of Outreach and the episode aired on A&E in 1999, but the series was not picked up. Baer has also written an unproduced film for Twentieth Century Fox entitled The Doctor Corps. Baer is a trustee of the Writers Guild of America Health and Pension Fund.

From 2013 to 2015, he was showrunner and executive producer of the TV series Under the Dome. In 2015, he co-wrote along Marc Cherry and Dan Truly the pilot episode of the comedy crime series Cheerleader Death Squad.

Fox has purchased Baer's show The Beast for the 2017–2018 season. The show, to be written by Baer and Dawn DeNoon and produced by 20th Century Fox Television in association with Baer Bones, will be a medical drama in which the main character has a clinical fear of death.

In 2018, it was announced that Baer was hired as the showrunner for the third season of the political thriller drama series Designated Survivor. The third season which consists of 10 episodes, premiered on Netflix on June 7, 2019.

=== Film career ===
A documentary film co-produced by Baer and Christine O'Malley and directed by Patrick Creadon, If You Build It, shows a year in the life of an innovative school in Bertie County, North Carolina. Facing a bleak economic future in the county, Bertie Public Schools Superintendent Chip Zullinger invites Emily Pilloton and Matt Miller to create a high school shop class for the 21st century. Their hope is that people's lives are changed due to great design. The film is part of the Art, Architecture, and Design series at the Newport Beach Film Festival in Newport Beach, CA. The film was released on 6 April 2013.

== Personal life ==
Baer lives in Los Angeles in the Hollywood Hills West neighborhood. In a July 2014 blog for The Huffington Post, Baer publicly acknowledged that he is gay.

== Filmography ==
=== Writer ===
| Year | Show | Episode | Notes |
|---|---|---|---|
| 1989 | ABC Afterschool Special | "Private Affairs" | Season 18, episode 2 |
| 1990 | China Beach | "Warriors" | Season 3, episode 16 |
| 1994 | ER | "Chicago Heat" | Story - season 1, episode 6 |
| 1994 | ER | "Blizzard" | Story - season 1, episode 10 |
| 1994 | ER | "The Gift" | Season 1, episode 11 |
| 1995 | ER | "Full Moon, Saturday Night" | Season 1, episode 20 |
| 1995 | ER | "Hell and High Water" | Season 2, episode 7 |
| 1996 | ER | "The Match" | Season 2, episode 17 |
| 1996 | ER | "Ghosts" | Season 3, episode 5 |
| 1996 | ER | "Ask Me No Questions, I'll Tell You No Lies" | Season 3, episode 9 |
| 1997 | ER | "Whose Appy Now?" | Season 3, episode 14 |
| 1997 | ER | "Calling Dr. Hathaway" | Story - Season 3, episode 19 |
| 1997 | ER | "Freak Show" | Season 4, episode 8 |
| 1998 | ER | "Gut Reaction" | Season 4, episode 18 |
| 1998 | ER | "Stuck on You" | Season 5, episode 6 |
| 1999 | ER | "Middle of Nowhere" | Season 5, episode 16 |
| 1999 | ER | "Humpty Dumpty" | Season 6, episode 7 |
| 2000 | ER | "Under Control" | Season 6, episode 16 |
| 2000 | ER | "Loose Ends" | Season 6, episode 20 |
| 2000 | ER | "Rescue Me" | Season 7, episode 7 |
| 2001 | Law & Order: Special Victims Unit | "Scourge" | Season 2, episode 21 |
| 2001 | Law & Order: Special Victims Unit | "Rooftop" | Season 3, episode 4 |
| 2003 | Law & Order: Special Victims Unit | "Control" | Season 5, episode 9 |
| 2005 | Law & Order: Special Victims Unit | "Storm" | Season 7, episode 10 |
| 2007 | Law & Order: Special Victims Unit | "Alternate" | Season 9, episode 1 |
| 2008 | Law & Order: Special Victims Unit | "Authority" | Season 9, episode 17 |

=== Director ===
| Year | Show | Episode | Notes |
|---|---|---|---|
| 1989 | ABC Afterschool Special | "Private Affairs" | Season 18, episode 2 |

=== Producer ===
| Year | Film | Film Type |
|---|---|---|
| 2012 | If You Build It | Documentary Film |
