= Lucas Williamson =

American basketball player (born 1999)

No. 55 – Start Lublin
- Position: Shooting guard
- League: PLK

Personal information
- Born: January 28, 1999 (age 27) Chicago, Illinois, U.S.
- Listed height: 6 ft 4 in (1.93 m)
- Listed weight: 205 lb (93 kg)

Career information
- High school: Whitney Young (Chicago, Illinois)
- College: Loyola Chicago (2017–2022)
- NBA draft: 2022: undrafted
- Playing career: 2022–present

Career history
- 2022–2023: Ontario Clippers
- 2023: Edmonton Stingers
- 2023–2026: Memphis Hustle
- 2026: Memphis Grizzlies
- 2026–present: Start Lublin

Career highlights
- First-team All-MVC (2022); Second-team All-MVC (2021); 2× MVC Defensive Player of the Year (2021, 2022); 3× MVC All-Defensive Team (2020–2022); MVC tournament MVP (2022); MVC All-Freshman Team (2018)
- Stats at NBA.com
- Stats at Basketball Reference

Lucas Williamson (born January 28, 1999) is an American professional basketball player for Start Lublin of the Polish Basketball League (PLK). In 2026 he had a brief stint with the NBA's Memphis Grizzlies. He played college basketball for the Loyola Ramblers.

== High school career ==
Williamson played basketball for Whitney M. Young Magnet High School in Chicago, Illinois. In his first season, he was the only freshman on the team and won the Class 4A state title alongside Jahlil Okafor. As a senior, Williamson averaged 17.5 points, 4.8 rebounds and 2.1 assists per game, leading his team to another Class 4A state title. He committed to playing college basketball for Loyola (Illinois) over offers from UIC and Northern Illinois.

== College career ==
As a freshman at Loyola, Williamson averaged 4.7 points and 2.2 rebounds per game, earning Missouri Valley Conference (MVC) All-Freshman and All-Bench Team honors. He helped 11th-seeded Loyola reach the Final Four of the 2018 NCAA tournament. Williamson missed about half of his sophomore season with two hand injuries. He averaged 8.8 points and 5.9 rebounds per game. As a junior, he averaged nine points and 3.3 rebounds per game and was an MVC All-Defensive Team selection. In his senior season, Williamson earned Second Team All-MVC honors and was named MVC Defensive Player of the Year. He helped Loyola reach the Sweet 16 of the NCAA Tournament, averaging 8.8 points and 3.9 rebounds per game while shooting 35.9 percent from three-point range. Following the season, Williamson took advantage of the extra season of eligibility granted by the NCAA due to the COVID-19 pandemic. He earned First Team All-MVC honors and was named MVC Defensive Player of the Year.

== Professional career ==
=== Ontario Clippers (2022–2023) ===
On June 24, 2022, Williamson signed an Exhibit 10 contract with the Los Angeles Clippers. On October 4, Williamson (along with Juwan Morgan and Michael Devoe) was waived by the Clippers. On October 24, Williamson joined the Ontario Clippers training camp roster.

=== Edmonton Stingers (2023) ===
On March 15, 2023, Williamson signed with the Edmonton Stingers of the Canadian Elite Basketball League.

=== Memphis Hustle (2023–2026) ===
On October 30, 2023, Williamson joined the Memphis Hustle.

=== Memphis Grizzlies (2026) ===
On March 31, 2026, Williamson was signed to a 10-day contract by the Memphis Grizzlies. On April 6, Williamson made his first career start, recording 17 points, five rebounds, four assists, and three steals as the Grizzlies lost to the Cleveland Cavaliers, 142–126. On April 10, Williamson re-signed with Memphis on a second 10-day contract. He made seven appearances (including two starts) for the Grizzlies during his rookie campaign, recording averages of 10.4 points, 5.4 points, and 2.6 assists.

=== Start Lublin (2026–present) ===
On July 30, 2026, he signed with Start Lublin of the Polish Basketball League (PLK).

== Career statistics ==
Legend
GP	Games played	GS	Games started	MPG	Minutes per game
FG%	Field goal percentage	3P%	3-point field goal percentage	FT%	Free throw percentage
RPG	Rebounds per game	APG	Assists per game	SPG	Steals per game
BPG	Blocks per game	PPG	Points per game	**Bold**	Career high

=== NBA ===
Year	Team	GP	GS	MPG	FG%	3P%	FT%	RPG	APG	SPG	BPG	PPG
2025–26	Memphis	7	2	32.0	.333	.283	1.000	5.4	2.6	1.6	.1	10.4
Career		7	2	32.0	.333	.283	1.000	5.4	2.6	1.6	.1	10.4

=== College ===
Year	Team	GP	GS	MPG	FG%	3P%	FT%	RPG	APG	SPG	BPG	PPG
2017–18	Loyola	**38**	5	20.2	.435	**.415**	.704	2.2	1.0	.8	**.3**	4.7
2018–19	Loyola	16	15	29.9	**.480**	.413	.600	**5.9**	1.7	**1.6**	**.3**	8.8
2019–20	Loyola	32	32	30.2	.448	.333	.692	3.3	1.7	1.5	**.3**	9.0
2020–21	Loyola	31	31	28.0	.435	.359	**.778**	3.9	2.1	1.4	.2	8.8
2021–22	Loyola	33	**33**	**32.0**	.442	.390	.728	5.0	**3.1**	1.4	**.3**	**13.7**
Career		150	116	27.6	.445	.377	.713	3.8	1.9	1.3	.3	8.9

== Personal life ==
Williamson served as the narrator and co-writer for The Loyola Project, a 2022 documentary film that details Loyola's 1963 men's basketball team and their journey in breaking down racial barriers en route to winning a national championship.
