= Of Two Minds =

Of Two Minds may refer to:

- Of Two Minds (2012 TV film)
- Of Two Minds (2012 documentary film)
- "Of Two Minds" (Supergirl)
- Of Two Minds (book)
