= The Loyola Project =

American documentary film

- Directed by: Patrick Creadon
- Written by: Lucas Williamson; William Neal; Julia Szromba
- Produced by: Christine O'Malley; Bob Parkinson; Betty Parkinson; Rob Parkinson; Corey McQuade
- Narrated by: Lucas Williamson
- Cinematography: Erin G. Wesley
- Edited by: Nick Andert; William Neal
- Music by: Alex Mansour
- Production company: O'Malley Creadon Productions
- Release date: 2022
- Running time: 90 minutes
- Country: United States
- Language: English

The Loyola Project is a 2022 documentary film about the 1963 Loyola Ramblers men's basketball team and the Game of Change. The film details how the Ramblers, led by coach George Ireland, broke down racial barriers in college basketball on their path to becoming NCAA champions.

The Loyola Project is directed by Patrick Creadon and is narrated by 2022 Ramblers guard and co-captain Lucas Williamson.

== Release ==
The Loyola Project premiered on CBS Sports Network on February 7, 2022 in honor of Black History Month.

Shortly after the film’s release, O’Malley Creadon Productions partnered with CBS and Northwestern Mutual to host the “63 for 63 Screening Series." In honor of the 1963 Ramblers team, the “63 for 63 Screening Series” brought The Loyola Project to 63 college campuses throughout the spring of 2022. Due to the success of this tour, O’Malley Creadon Productions later announced that they would be expanding screening opportunities to all American universities through June 2023, as well as creating a separate tour for businesses and community organizations.

== Reception ==
The Loyola Project received positive reviews upon its release. Writing for the Chicago Sun-Times, Rick Telander praised the documentary as a “historic, mesmerizing, complex film.” In a similarly positive review, WGN Radio’s John Landecker called The Loyola Project an “unbelievably great documentary” that was “recommended for everyone.”
