= Emily Pilloton-Lam =

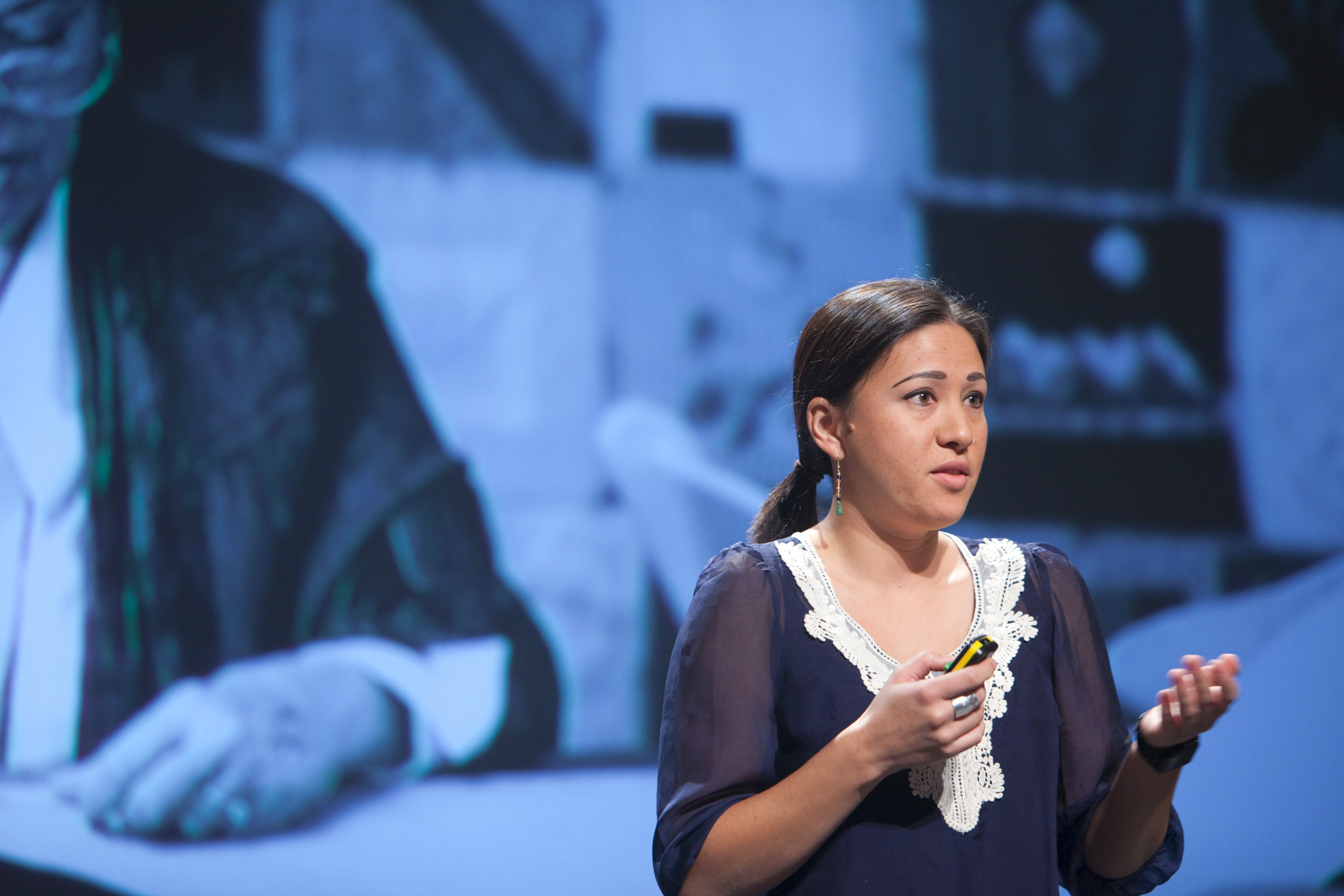
- Image of Emily Pilloton-Lam Presenting at PopTech in 2009.
- Born: Emily Pilloton; 1981 (age 44–45); Chicago, Illinois
- Citizenship: American
- Education: Master of Fine Arts in Architecture, Interior Architecture, and Designed Objects, The School of the Art Institute of Chicago, 2003–2005; Bachelor of Arts in Architecture, University of California, Berkeley, 1999–2003
- Occupations: Founder and executive director, girls garage (formerly project h design)
- Website: https://www.emilypillotonlam.com/

Emily Pilloton-Lam is an American architectural designer, builder, teacher, and author known for her work as the founder and executive director of the non-profit organization, Girls Garage, formerly known as Project H Design.

Pilloton-Lam's educational initiative with then boyfriend Matt Miller in Bertie County, North Carolina was profiled in the 2013 documentary film, If You Build It.

== Early life and education ==
Pilloton-Lam was born in 1981, and grew up in Chicago, Illinois and Marin County, California. Her father was born in France, while her mother was born outside of Chicago to immigrant parents from Qingdao and Hong Kong. From a young age, she remembers building structures out of a Quadro set, which she attributes to her early interest in design.

She attended UC Berkeley in Berkeley, California, graduating in 2003 with a Bachelor of Arts degree in architecture. She completed her master's degree in architecture, interior architecture, and designed objects at The School of the Art Institute of Chicago, graduating in 2005.

== Project H Design ==
After graduation, Pilloton-Lam founded the nonprofit Project H Design, which addressing "Humanity, Habitats, Health, and Happiness" initiatives. It sought to promote design education and community-building.

"There are elements to our work and our approach that are not just involving the community but are really dependent upon the community’s vision for their own landscape. Design is not something most people would automatically look to as a way to fix a public education system, and yet, it’s done a lot for our students and their families—and beyond the classroom walls for the community".

Project H Design contained a program called Studio H, a design/build program for high school students that simultaneously provided college credits and allowed students to engage with full-scale projects for their community. Based out of Bertie County, North Carolina, one of the poorest counties in the state, Studio H was integrated into local high school curriculums as a means of redefining and reinventing vocational training for the 21st century. Studio H started with ideas of design literacy paired with building projects that would contribute to the students' local community. It used the design/build framework as a means of teaching critical thinking and creative skills that could support the students' future goals regardless of what kind of career or education they sought out after highschool.

In 2013, the documentary If You Build It tracked a year in the life of Studio H, focusing specifically on the Windsor Farmers Market project addressing the area's inherent contradiction as a food desert with rich agricultural legacy.

=== Completed projects ===
- Community Chicken Coops, Bertie County, NC, 2010
- Cornhole Boards, Bertie County, NC, 2010
- Windsor Farmers Market, Bertie County, NC, 2011
- Farmstands, Bertie County, NC, 2012

== Girls Garage ==
In 2013, Pilloton-Lam moved the organization to Berkeley, California, under the new name Girls Garage, to address the gender gap in the architecture and construction industries. Under this new name, the organization also moved away from the model of integrating workshops into high school curriculum, to create after-school and summer programming for girls and gender-diverse youth ages 9–18. Girls Garage became the first dedicated design and building work space for girls in the United States with its 5000-square-foot workshop in West Berkeley.

Since 2013, Girls Garage has completed 171 building projects.

Proceeds from Pilloton-Lam's 2020 book, Girls Garage: How to Use Any Tool, Tackle Any Project, and Build the World You Want to See, also support the non-profit.

== Teaching ==
In addition to her role as an educator with Project H/Girls Garage, Pilloton-Lam has also held several teaching positions at post-secondary institutions, including as a visiting professor at the University of California, Davis starting in 2015, as a lecturer at the College of Environmental Design at the University of California, Berkeley between 2016 and 2020, and at Stanford University in 2023.

== Writing ==
- Design Revolution: 100 Products that Empower People, 2009
- Tell Them I Built This: Transforming Schools, Communities, and Lives with Design-Based Education, 2012
- Girls Garage: How to Use Any Tool, Tackle Any Project, and Build The World You Want To See, 2020

== Awards and honors ==
Along with features and interviews in a variety of news media sources, Pilloton-Lam has been recognized for her contributions to design literacy and community-building with the following awards and honors:

- AIA SF Community Alliance Award, 2022
- AIGA SF Fellow Award, 2022
- Yerba Buena Center for the Arts' YBCA100 (Girls Garage), 2019
- Honorary doctorate, Columbus College of Art and Design, 2018
- SEED Award, Design Corps, 2015
- Master of Design, Fast Company, 2011

== Personal life ==
Pilloton-Lam currently lives with her family in Berkeley, California.

In 2021, she published an essay about hyphenating her last name to include her mother's maiden name, Lam — to honor her Chinese lineage, saying "Today, March 17th, I am taking my mother’s maiden name, Lam, as a matriarchal hyphenate. I am doing so for myself, for my mother, for my Chinese matriarchal lineage, and for my Asian American community".
