= 1988 Notre Dame vs. Miami football game =

College football game

Catholics vs. Convicts
- Non-conference game
Miami Hurricanes	Notre Dame Fighting Irish
(4–0)	(5–0)
30	31
Head coach: Jimmy Johnson	Head coach: Lou Holtz
AP / Coaches; 1 / 1	AP / Coaches; 4 / 5
	1	2	3	4	Total
Miami	0	21	0	9	30
Notre Dame	7	14	10	0	31
- Date: October 15, 1988
- Season: 1988
- Stadium: Notre Dame Stadium
- Location: South Bend, Indiana
- National anthem: Band of the Fighting Irish
- Halftime show: Band of the Fighting Irish
- Attendance: 59,075

United States TV coverage
- Network: CBS
- Announcers: Brent Musburger and Pat Haden

The 1988 Notre Dame vs. Miami football game (known colloquially as Catholics vs. Convicts) was a college football game played between the Miami Hurricanes of the University of Miami and the Fighting Irish of the University of Notre Dame on October 15, 1988, at Notre Dame Stadium in Notre Dame, Indiana.

Both the Notre Dame Fighting Irish and the Miami Hurricanes came into the game undefeated. Notre Dame won the closely contested game 31–30.

== Background ==
The phrase "Catholics vs. Convicts", a T-shirt slogan created prior to the matchup by Notre Dame students and friends Joe Frederick and Michael Caponigro was reported by the press. The slogan was a play on Notre Dame's Catholic image and Miami's roster of flamboyant football players. Before the 1988 season, two players from the Miami team were arrested and their scholarships taken away. These arrests were highly publicized and added to the development of the moniker.

== The game ==
The two teams met on October 15, 1988, at Notre Dame Stadium north of South Bend, Indiana. Both teams were undefeated going into the game. Miami, the defending national champions, came in ranked No. 1 holding a 36-game regular season winning streak while the Irish were ranked No. 4. The game, which was preceded by a fight between the two teams in the entrance tunnel, was named by USA Today as one of the greatest college football games of the period 1982–2002.

With Miami trailing 31–24 and facing a critical fourth-and-7 from deep in Irish territory midway through the fourth quarter, Hurricanes quarterback Steve Walsh connected with Miami running back Cleveland Gary streaking across the middle of the field inside the Irish 5-yard line for the first down. He caught the football, turned, was tackled and fumbled the ball at the one-yard line. Notre Dame inside linebacker Michael Stonebreaker recovered the football. The referees ruled the play as a fumble and Notre Dame took possession at the 2-yard line where the ball was recovered.

Near the end of a closely contested game, Miami scored a touchdown with 45 seconds remaining on a 4th down 10-yard pass from Walsh to receiver Andre Brown to pull within one point of the Fighting Irish, 31–30. Rather than kick the extra point and likely end the game in a tie, Miami head coach Jimmy Johnson decided to attempt a two-point conversion, later reasoning that "We always play to win." However, Walsh's pass was batted down by Fighting Irish defender Pat Terrell, and Notre Dame won 31–30, resulting in Miami's first regular season loss since losing to Florida on September 7, 1985.

In the ESPN 30 for 30 documentary Catholics vs. Convicts, Notre Dame safety George Streeter claimed he knocked the ball loose from Gary's hand prior to Gary being down or across the goal line. In the same documentary, Gary disagrees with Streeter's account of events, claiming he was palming the ball with his right hand and the ball was across the goal line prior to his knee hitting the ground or the ball coming loose.

The documentary also demonstrated that Andre Brown never had control of the ball on the touchdown catch that made the score 31–30. Walsh, former Miami offensive lineman Leon Searcy, and Dan Le Batard (who was a student at Miami at the time) all agreed that the ball was not caught.

== Aftermath ==
Notre Dame would go on to win their remaining five games of the season, including defeating then #2 ranked USC in Los Angeles 27–10. The Irish went on to beat the West Virginia Mountaineers 34–21 in the 1989 Fiesta Bowl and win their eleventh claimed National Championship.

Miami would win their remaining six games of the season. They would be selected to play in the Orange Bowl against #6 Nebraska. Miami easily won the contest 23–3. Miami would finish ranked #2 in both the AP and Coaches polls behind Notre Dame.

In a 2005 poll conducted by the University of Notre Dame, the 31–30 win over Miami was voted the Greatest Victory in Notre Dame Stadium history. Miami fans have adopted the "Convicts" title for their own use. At a 2017 Notre Dame-Miami game, a Hurricanes fan held up a sign stating "I'm Catholic but Today I'm a CONVICT".

This game was featured in the ESPN 30 for 30 documentary titled Catholics vs. Convicts, directed by Patrick Creadon. Creadon was a senior at Notre Dame when the game took place. His roommate that year was one of the people behind the controversial t-shirt that gave the game its name. The film premiered on December 10, 2016, to over 2 million viewers and remains the most watched 30 for 30 film since its broadcast.

The rivalry continues on in the present day.

In 2020, this game contributed to the naming of the Mormons vs. Mullets game between BYU and Coastal Carolina.
