= Ski Bum: The Warren Miller Story =

Documentary film

- Directed by: Patrick Creadon
- Produced by: Christine O'Malley; Jeff Conroy; Joe Berry
- Edited by: Josh Earl
- Release date: January 25, 2019 (Slamdance)
- Running time: 93 minutes
- Country: United States
- Language: English

Ski Bum: The Warren Miller Story is a 2019 documentary film directed by Patrick Creadon. The film chronicles the life of skier and filmmaker Warren Miller. Ski Bum features Miller's final interview before his death in 2018.

The documentary premiered as the opening night film at the 2019 Slamdance Film Festival, where it won the Audience Award for Beyond Feature.

== Cast ==
Creadon interviewed several professional skiers and filmmakers, including Warren Miller in his final interview before his death in 2018, Olympic gold medalist Jonny Moseley, and professional extreme skiers Scot Schmidt and Kristen Ulmer.

== Reception ==
Writing for The Hollywood Reporter, Justin Lowe called the film "outstanding" and a "stirring tribute" to Miller. He also wrote, "The film credit 'A Warren Miller Production' thrilled ski professionals and thousands of other sports enthusiasts worldwide for decades. Now they can revel in this exceptional portrait of a true filmmaking iconoclast that's almost as exhilarating as an actual Warren Miller production."
