= Christine O'Malley =

American film producer

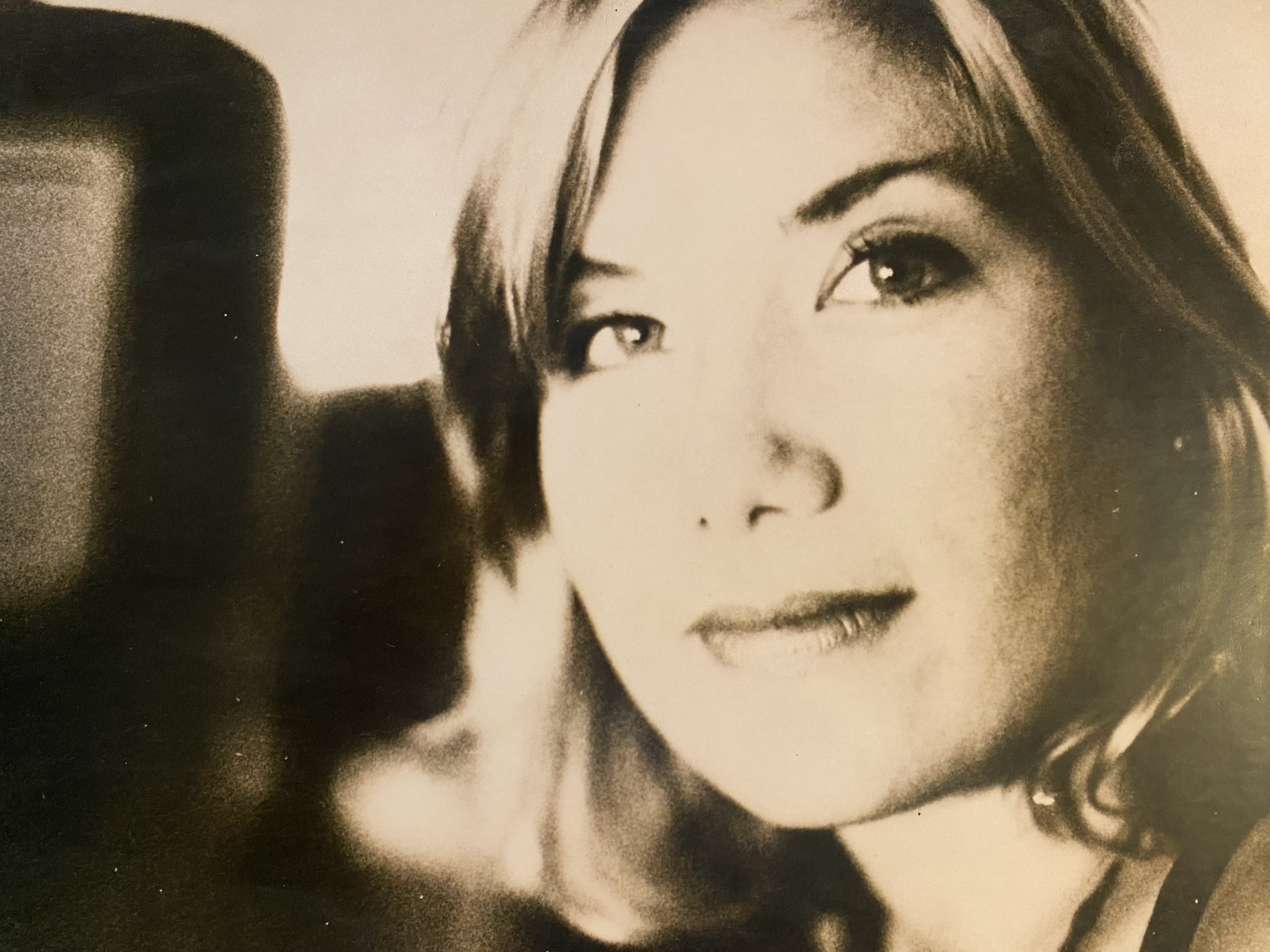
- O'Malley in July 2021
- Occupation: Film producer
- Known for: Wordplay (2006); I.O.U.S.A (2008); If You Build It (2013); Catholics vs. Convicts (2016); Taylor Swift: Miss Americana (2020); Pretty Baby: Brooke Shields (2023)
- Partner: Patrick Creadon
- Website: www.ocpmedia.com

Christine O'Malley is an American film producer and documentary filmmaker.

== Film career ==
In 2005, O'Malley and her husband Patrick Creadon produced their first feature-length documentary, Wordplay. Wordplay premiered at the 2006 Sundance Film Festival. O’Malley has since produced or executive produced more than twenty-five feature-length documentary films.

=== Filmography (partial list) ===
Year	Title	Producer	Executive Producer	Director	Notes
2023	Pretty Baby: Brooke Shields	Yes		Lana Wilson	2023 Sundance Film Festival
2023	Angel City (TV Series)	Yes	Yes	Arlene Nelson	Three-part documentary series produced for HBO Max.
2022	The Loyola Project	Yes		Patrick Creadon	"Mesmerizing" -The Chicago Sun-Times
2020	Taylor Swift: Miss Americana	Yes		Lana Wilson	Opening night film, 2020 Sundance Film Festival; Netflix; National Board of Review Top Documentary selection
2019	Ski Bum: The Warren Miller Story	Yes		Patrick Creadon	Opening night film, 2019 Slamdance Film Festival; Winner, Audience Award
2018	Hesburgh	Yes		Patrick Creadon	New York Times "Critics' Pick"; Entertainment Weekly "Must-See Docs of 2019"
2017	The Last Animals			Kate Brooks	Co-producer
2016	Catholics vs. Convicts	Yes		Patrick Creadon	Produced as part of ESPN's 30 for 30 documentary series; Nominated for Primetime Emmy Award for Outstanding Documentary or Nonfiction Series
2016	Jim: The James Foley Story			Brian Oakes	Consulting producer, Academy Award nomination for Best Original Song for "The Empty Chair" by Sting. Winner, "Audience Award" at the 2016 Sundance Film Festival
2015	All Work All Play	Yes		Patrick Creadon	
2013	If You Build It	Yes		Patrick Creadon	Winner, 2014 Independent Spirit Award Bright Future Award
2012	Of Two Minds		Yes	Lisa Klein, Doug Blush	Executive Producer
2011	These Amazing Shadows	Yes		Paul Mariano, Kurt Norton	2011 Sundance Film Festival
2011	Superheroes		Yes	Michael Barnett	Executive Producer
2010	The Big Uneasy	Yes		Harry Shearer	
2009	Square Roots: The Story of SpongeBob SquarePants	Yes		Patrick Creadon	One-hour television special produced for Nickelodeon
2008	I.O.U.S.A.	Yes		Patrick Creadon	Nominated for 14th Critics' Choice Awards; shortlisted for Academy Award
2006	Wordplay	Yes		Patrick Creadon	Nominated for 12th Critics' Choice Awards; National Board of Review Top Documentary selection

In addition to her producing work, O'Malley has worked in many different roles throughout the film industry. She served on the Sundance Women in Film Committee, founded the nonprofit Story into Action with producer Neal Baer, and in 2014 was the director of AFI Docs, the documentary film festival run by the American Film Institute in Washington, D.C. In 2019, O'Malley was invited to join the Academy of Motion Picture Arts and Sciences.
