= Hesburgh (film) =

American documentary film about Fr. Theodore Hesburgh

- Promotional poster
- Directed by: Patrick Creadon
- Written by: William Neal; Nick Andert; Jerry Barca
- Produced by: Jerry Barca; Christine O'Malley
- Starring: Theodore Hesburgh
- Narrated by: Maurice LaMarche
- Edited by: Nick Andert; William Neal
- Release dates: June 2018 (AFI Docs); June 17, 2019
- Running time: 106 minutes
- Country: United States
- Language: English

Hesburgh is a 2018 American documentary film directed by Patrick Creadon. The film follows the life of Fr. Theodore Hesburgh, President of the University of Notre Dame from 1952 through 1987, particularly during his time working on the U.S. Commission on Civil Rights. The film is drawn from archival footage, as well as interviews with family, colleagues at Notre Dame, politicians, journalists, and historians. Maurice LaMarche provides the voice of Hesburgh, narrating the documentary with words drawn from Hesburgh's writings and tapes.

Hesburgh premiered at the 2018 AFI Docs film festival, and was widely distributed theatrically in 2019. The film received positive reviews from most critics, including those of The New York Times, The Washington Post, and the Los Angeles Times.

== Synopsis ==
Along with archival footage, Hesburgh consists of dozens of interviews with friends and family members as well as prominent figures such as Speaker of the US House of Representatives Nancy Pelosi, former chair of the U.S. Commission on Civil Rights Mary Frances Berry, former U.S. Senator Alan K. Simpson, journalist Ted Koppel, former Secretary of Defense Leon Panetta, and university presidents Fr. Edward Malloy and Fr. John I. Jenkins.

The film begins with Hesburgh's early life, showing that he had felt called to the priesthood from the age of six. He wanted to be a military chaplain after being ordained a priest in 1943, but instead he was sent to get his doctorate and return to Notre Dame to teach and serve as a chaplain to returning World War II veterans on campus. In 1952, he was appointed president of the university at the age of 35.

Much of the documentary focuses on Hesburgh's tenure as president and his work both on and off campus. His 35 years in office saw Notre Dame's enrollment, faculty, and endowment increase dramatically as he transformed the school previously known only for its football team into a prestigious, coeducational academic institution.

President Dwight D. Eisenhower named him to the National Science Board in 1954, and he was the Vatican City's representative to the International Atomic Energy Agency. At conferences, delegates from the United States and the Soviet Union did not want to speak with each other, but they trusted Hesburgh, and he became friends with both sides and tried to bridge the divide in an effort to defuse the nuclear arms race.

Hesburgh details a number of examples of his commitment to freedom of expression. Several times he was chastised by Catholic Church leadership at the Vatican for these views; he refused Cardinal Alfredo Ottaviani's demand to censor an essay by John Courtney Murray on freedom of religion, and in 1967 he led the International Federation of Catholic Universities in publishing the Land O' Lakes statement saying Catholic universities should be free from the Church's authority.

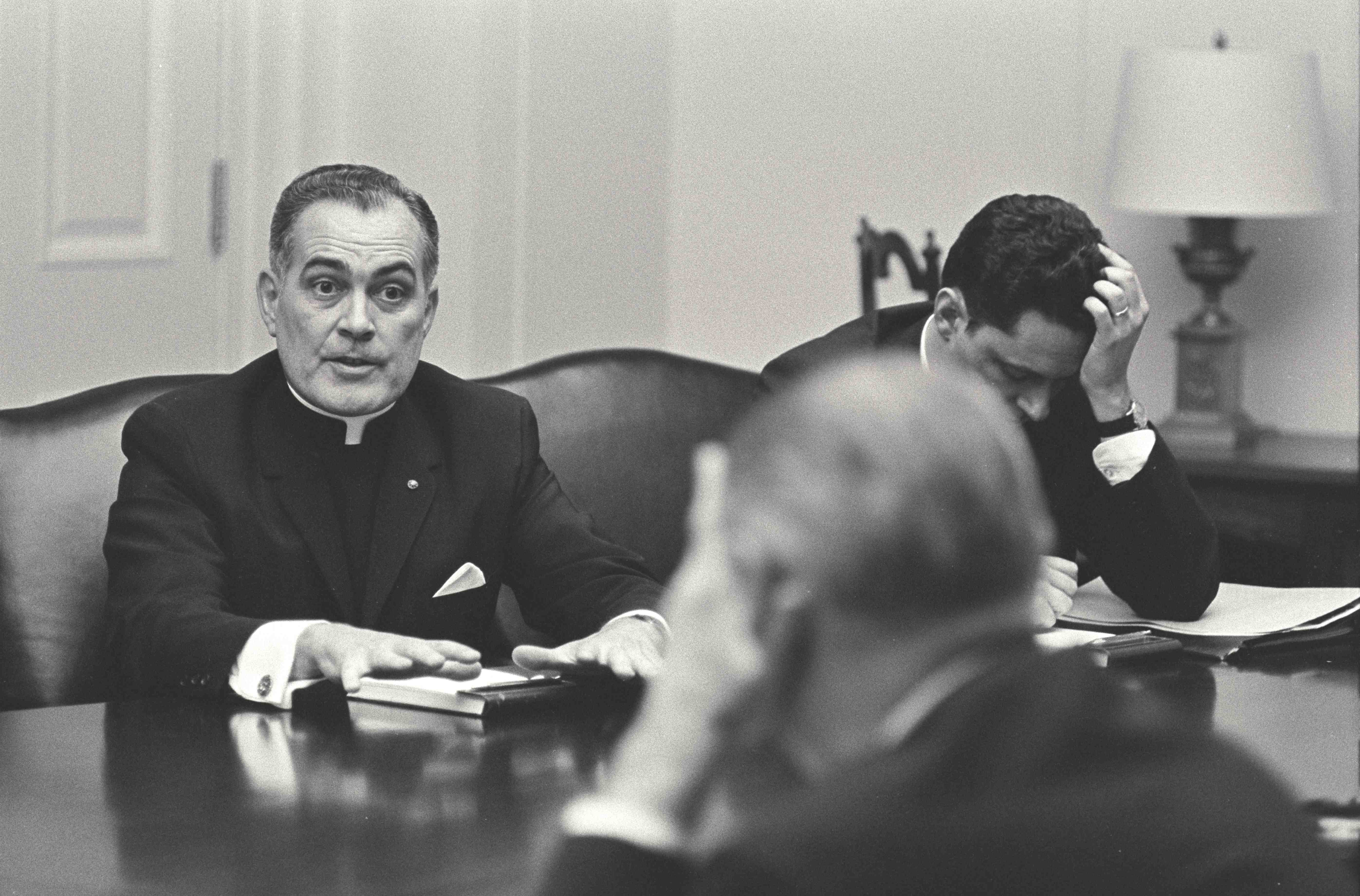
Hesburgh with the US Commission on Civil Rights

In 1956, he was named to the US Commission on Civil Rights, which researched racial inequality in the South facilitated by Jim Crow laws. The committee spent two years gathering information despite stiff opposition from local leaders like George Wallace, but when it was time to write a report, the commission, which included both African Americans and segregationists, disagreed on the contents. Again, Hesburgh used his ability to build bridges between adversaries; he invited the members to Land O' Lakes, Wisconsin, where they fished and bonded as friends, soon afterwards finishing a report recommending strong civil rights legislation. The film continues to follow Hesburgh's involvement in civil rights through the next few presidential administrations; it says he was disappointed by John F. Kennedy's politically motivated sluggishness on legislation but impressed by Lyndon B. Johnson's savvy that led to the passage of the Civil Rights Act of 1964.

In the late 1960s, he caused controversy by taking a hard-line stance against student protests against the Vietnam War at Notre Dame with a policy that would suspend or expel students if they didn't disperse a disruptive protest within 15 minutes. This led president Richard Nixon to see Hesburgh as a pro-war loyal ally and appoint him chair of the U.S. Commission on Civil Rights. However, sparked by the Kent State shootings, Hesburgh eventually became more vocally opposed to the war. The commission published a report critical of Nixon's enforcement of the Civil Rights Act in 1972, and the president removed Hesburgh soon after.

The documentary then shows Hesburgh's active post-presidency life, including when he helped welcome president Barack Obama to campus in 2009 and defended the controversial invitation. It ends with his final days, death, and funeral in 2015.

The film highlights Hesburgh's close friendship with a number of influential people. He had a relationship with all the popes of his time, but he was personal friends with Pope Paul VI, who he asked to help release captured journalist and Notre Dame alumnus Robert Sam Anson during the Vietnam War. Margo Howard is interviewed and details Hesburgh's long standing friendship with her mother Eppie Lederer, the writer of advice column Ask Ann Landers.

== Production and release ==
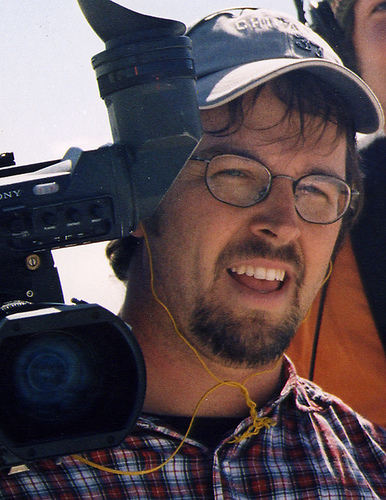
Director Patrick Creadon in 2004

Director Patrick Creadon attended Notre Dame during the last years of Hesburgh's presidency, graduating in 1989, and was aware of his prestige. "But being a documentary filmmaker, I always have a little bit of a skeptical eye," Creadon said. "And I really wanted to see for myself if his work really lived up to his reputation. And it did." He also said he wanted the film to serve as a reminder of what good leadership looks like, as well as to preserve Hesburgh's legacy after he was no longer on the world stage: "I realized that his story was just going to fade away," he said. "Certainly not within the Notre Dame community, but outside the Notre Dame community people were quickly forgetting who he was and what he meant."

The production team did extensive research, referencing newspaper articles, personal letters, and film footage to make the documentary, although Creadon said he avoided reading Hesburgh's autobiography, God, Country, Notre Dame, which helped him maintain an objective perspective. Voice actor Maurice LaMarche provided the first-person narration, drawn from Hesburgh's writings and interviews.

Creadon said that the filmmakers were worried that the film would struggle to find an audience outside of a Notre Dame audience, but they were encouraged by a sold-out Washington, D.C. premiere at AFI Docs in June, 2018. The film was released on April 26, 2019, in Chicago and South Bend, Indiana.

== Critical reception ==
On the review aggregator website Rotten Tomatoes, Hesburgh has an 82% approval rating over 17 reviews, with an average rating of 7.1/10. On Metacritic, the film has an weighted average score of 83 out of 100 based on five reviews, indicating "universal acclaim".

Writing for The New York Times, Glenn Kenny praised Hesburgh as "consistently smart about its subject" and noted it would be a welcome respite for Catholics to see a film about a "genuinely heroic"—not scandal-ridden—priest. Michael Rechtshaffen also offered a positive review in the Los Angeles Times, calling the film "informational as it is inspirational" and "thoroughly engaging". The Washington Post's Ann Hornaday praised what she called a "moving, illuminating slice of American life and social history" but asked if Hesburgh was too good to be true and noted that the film did not discuss the Catholic Church sexual abuse cases. Michael Sean Winters wrote a review for the National Catholic Reporter calling Hesburgh "extraordinary", although he stated some of the commentary was "uneven".

In The Hollywood Reporter, John DeFore was more critical of the film's lack of criticism of its title figure—calling it a borderline hagiography—and wrote that "it doesn't necessarily convince those of us who don't know the man that we needed to see a doc about him". Tom Long, in a review for The Detroit News, also said that the film is too one-sided in its praise for the title figure and "offers little insight into whatever battles—internal or external—Hesburgh must have fought".
