= Pat Terrell =

American football player (born 1968)

No. 37, 27, 40
- Position: Safety

Personal information
- Born: March 18, 1968 (age 58); Memphis, Tennessee, U.S.
- Listed height: 6 ft 1 in (1.85 m)
- Listed weight: 204 lb (93 kg)

Career information
- High school: Lakewood (St. Petersburg, Florida)
- College: Notre Dame
- NFL draft: 1990: 2nd round, 49th overall pick

Career history
- Los Angeles Rams (1990–1993); New York Jets (1994); Carolina Panthers (1995–1997); Green Bay Packers (1998)

Career NFL statistics
- Interceptions: 11
- Interceptions yards: 59
- Sacks: 1
- Stats at Pro Football Reference

Patrick Christopher Terrell (born March 18, 1968) is an American former professional football player who was a safety in the National Football League (NFL) for the Los Angeles Rams, New York Jets, Carolina Panthers, and Green Bay Packers. He played college football for the Notre Dame Fighting Irish. He was selected 49th overall in the second round of the 1990 NFL Draft by the Rams.

Terrell earned a victory for the Fighting Irish during their 1988 National Championship season. In a game billed as the "Catholics vs. Convicts", #1 Miami pulled to within one point with a touchdown with less than one minute to go in the fourth quarter, making the score 31-30. Miami coach Jimmy Johnson made the decision to go for the two-point conversion, and called for a pass play to the right corner of the endzone. Terrell batted away Steve Walsh's pass, sealing the victory for the Irish, and helping them roll onward to a 12-0 season and the national title. He was a 1986 First Team All-South Independent selection

He and Chad Cota both had 49-yard interception returns against Dallas in the first round of the 1996 playoffs, thereby tying each other for the career, season, and single-game Panthers' franchise records for post-season interception return yards.
