= If You Build It =

- film poster
- Directed by: Patrick Creadon
- Produced by: Christine O'Malley; Neal Baer
- Narrated by: Emily Pilloton-Lam; Matt Miller
- Cinematography: George Desort
- Edited by: Nick Andert; Douglas Blush; Daniel J. Clark
- Music by: Peter Golub
- Production company: O'Malley Creadon Productions
- Distributed by: Long Shot Factory
- Release dates: April 6, 2013 (Durham, NC)
- Running time: 85 minutes
- Country: United States
- Language: English

If You Build It is a 2013 documentary directed by Patrick Creadon, produced by Neal Baer, and filmed on location largely in the town of Windsor and surrounding Bertie County, North Carolina, the state's poorest county.

The documentary follows a year in the life of an innovative, design-based high school program, culminating with the design and sixteen-week construction of a farmer's market pavilion, the only farmers market pavilion in the U.S. designed and built by high school students.

The film's title is a truncated reference to the catchphrase "if you build it, he will come" from the 1989 film Field of Dreams.

== Synopsis ==
In 2010, Superintendent of Public Schools for Bertie County, Chip Zullinger (1951–2014) had been hired to address the school district's serious shortcomings. After completing four large architectural projects with designer Emily Pilloton-Lam (author of the 2009 book Design Revolution) and architect Matt Miller, Zullinger invited the two to create a high school curriculum.

Pilloton-Lam and Miller described the curriculum, ultimately named Studio H, as shop class for the 21st century, where the design process could address the community's problems and its own sense of possibility. Named after its focus on "humanity, habitats, health and happiness," the curriculum "empowered young people to become creative problem solvers and at the same time encourage them to become more active citizens." Variety quoted Pilloton-Lam, saying the project's purpose was to "plant small seeds in our students that years from now could result in a new kind of resource."

Pilloton-Lam and partner Miller, worked with 10 (initially 13) high school students at Bertie Early College High School through the year-long, full-scale design/build curriculum – following six design rules: there is no design without critical action; we work 'with' not 'for;' we start locally and scale globally; create systems, not stuff; document, share and measure; and finally build. The students began the school year with constructing water purifiers from clay and cow pies. After designing, constructing and selling corn hole boards, the students follow with full-scale chicken coops of their own design and culminate the year with the design and construction of an open-air farmer's market, which subsequently became known as the Windsor Super Market (depicted on the movie poster above, right).

The project team and the community had identified a new farmer's market as a viable and desirable community project, and under the leadership of Pilloton-Lam and Miller the students focused on developing design and construction skills: critical thinking, research (e.g., analyzing Buckminster Fuller's Dymaxion House), sketching, and drafting, along with welding and real-world construction trades. Pilloton-Lam and Miller in turn completed construction documents and specifications, worked with a structural engineer and filed for construction permits – while also preparing and conducting three hours of daily classroom instruction.

The film backtracks to tell the story of Matt Miller and his thesis project from the Cranbrook Academy, where he designed and constructed along with classmate Thomas Gardner a 900 sf, two-story infill house. The house was ultimately abandoned, leading Miller to conclude the project failed because the end-user was insufficiently engaged and invested in process.

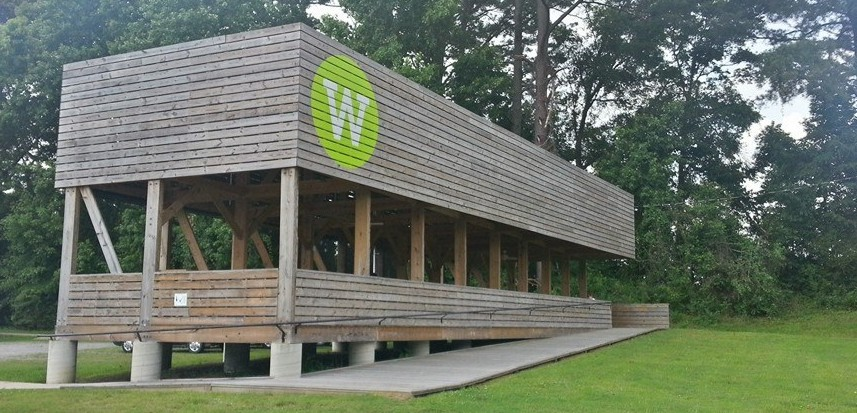
The Windsor Farmer's Market, aka the Windsor Super Market

Together the Project H team identified student Stevie Mizelle's preliminary concept model to develop further, subsequently completing construction of the farmer's market to approximately 75% before the school year ended. The design features a large wood platform for vendor booths with vertical wood trusses supporting a rectilinear roofed canopy with wood slats designed to filter and control solar glare; a main floor at the same height above grade as a pickup truck bed, allowing vendors to back up to the "loading dock" at each vendor stall and walk their goods directly off their truck into their booth; and a long ramp at the front to allow pedestrian accessibility and to provide a symbolic front porch for visitors.

Early in the school year, Pilloton-Lam and Miller chose to continue with the project after Zullinger, their prime backer, was dismissed by the school board, and the board became unwilling to underwrite the curriculum and withdrew their offered salaries. Pilloton-Lam and Miller continued to work with the students and subsequently completed construction of the farmer's market after the school year ended. The Windsor Super Market opened in October 2011.

Students featured in Studio H were Erick Bowen, Rodecoe Dunlow, Kerron Hayes, Anthony Johnson, Stevie Mizelle, Cameron Perry, Cj Robertson, Jamesha Thompson, Colin White and Alexia Williams. The film also features County Commissioner Ron Wesson as well as volunteer Eric Wandmacher (friend of Pilloton-Lam and Miller) and Superintendent of Public Schools, Chip Zullinger.

== Background ==
My goal in going in to Bertie County was not to go in and just design for them, but to really teach their kids about the design process and do something for the community with their high school students. That, in a way, transcends a lot of this social design movement stuff ... and hopefully [it's] the next phase of what that movement can be.

—Matthew Miller

Prior to one-year Studio H curriculum in Bertie County, Pilloton-Lam and Miller had completed four architectural projects with the school board, as backed by Superintendent Zullinger: four playgrounds, three computer labs, a weight room for the football team, and a county-wide graphic campaign. Friction on the school board developed with another Zullinger-backed project, "Connect Bertie," a project to bring free county-wide internet connectivity by paying an outside entity, Century Link, to provide the internet services at a cost of $2 million annually. The tension culminated with Zullwinger's dismissal, followed a reversal of the dismissal and then acceptance of his resignation. Without his support and the offered salaries, Zullwinger's departure directly threatened the Studio H project.

Other tensions arose, and in a 2013 interview, Pilloton-Lam identified a racially and politically charged context that surrounded the curriculum and the project — describing Bertie County as a place where "hundreds of years of slavery and institutionalized racism is very much still alive and kicking." On release of the film, Pilloton-Lam and Miller said "they said they still believe it was fear of change – not lack of money in a budget that topped $30 million – that ultimately led to the board's decision."

Pilloton-Lam had grown up near Mount Tamalpais, California, attributing the German toy Quadro with inspiring her interest in design. She later studied at the College of Environmental Design, UC Berkeley and the Art Institute of Chicago, during a period when there was no curriculum but when there was a 100,000 sf shop class.

Matt Miller was born in West Virginia and has architecture degrees from the University of Tennessee and Cranbrook Academy of Art. He has taught architecture and design at the Rhode Island School of Design, the College of Creative Studies, and UC Berkeley – and worked with Architecture for Humanity. Miller was the first student at the Cranbrook Academy to design and also build his thesis project (along with classmate Thomas Gardner): a 900 sf, two-story block infill house at 2126 Pierce Street in Poletown, Detroit. The house, ultimately abandoned, had a construction budget of $60,000 and used all-volunteer labor along with carefully selected materials (e.g., concrete block and rubber membrane roofing) to keep costs down.

== Reception ==
As of mid-2014, the film had received a rating on Rotten Tomatoes of 78% favorable critic response based on 27 reviews, with an average score of 6.79/10. Architectural Record called the film "a document of America at its most vulnerable."

== Follow up ==
Pilloton-Lam and Miller, who had been a couple, split up some time after the period depicted in the documentary. Matthew Miller is now the lead design/build instructor at (co)studio, a public high school program in Carbondale, Colorado. Pilloton-Lam continues to direct Studio H, which is now in its fourth year, at the REALM Charter School in Berkeley, California.

Studio H has grown to include more than 200 students, a staff of seven (paid) and 24 built projects around the country (as of mid 2014). In Bertie County as of 2012, the Studio H program had completed 15 architectural and design projects, worked with 26 students and (in addition to the farmer's market pavilion) constructed two roadside farmstands for important county intersections, and organized a town-managed association for local farmers. Students have worked on these projects for high school and college credits as well as stipends.

Early in the film, student Stevie Mizelle – whose preliminary design for the farmer's market was ultimately selected by the team for design development – joked: "school, I hate it, my dad hated it, my granddaddy hated it. I'm carrying on a tradition." He currently studies animal behavior at North Carolina State University in Raleigh, and made Dean's List his first year. He was the first male relative in his immediate family to graduate from high school, attributing his graduation to his work with Studio H.

Chip Zullinger died suddenly in April 2014. Zullinger, widely described as ahead of his time, told Patrick Creadon, director of "If you Build it," he had been fired at least eight times and wore that as a badge of honor. Creadon described Zullinger as a "renegade school superintendent, a great thinker and a steamroller when it came to getting kids the education they deserve."
