= Of Two Minds (2012 documentary film) =

- Film poster
- Directed by: Lisa Klein and Doug Blush
- Production company: MadPix
- Distributed by: Docurama Films
- Release date: April 2012
- Running time: 89 Minutes
- Countries: United States, France, Canada
- Language: English

Of Two Minds is a documentary filmed and directed by Lisa Klein and Doug Blush, that touches on the lives of different individuals suffering from bipolar disorder. Klein chose to proceed with the documentary came about when she read Liz Spikol’s article in Philadelphia Weekly on her life with bipolar disorder.

== Synopsis ==
The documentary focuses on the daily struggles that these individuals face involving the complications that arise from being in relationships, troubles with working and maintaining jobs, and medical insurance issues. Klein discusses her sister Tina, who died in 1994, and her efforts to understand this disease and how it impacts Individuals suffering from it.

== Cast ==
- Tina Klein
- Cheri Keating
- Michael “Petey” Peterson
- Carlton Davis
- Liz Spikol

== Reception ==
Of Two Minds was reviewed by the Los Angeles Times and Variety, the former of which stated that "does give a vivid picture of what life is like for these folks, though it has a tendency to take unnecessary detours to other interviewees and to reveal a little too much about the intimate lives of the three key subjects."
