= Patrick Creadon =

American film director

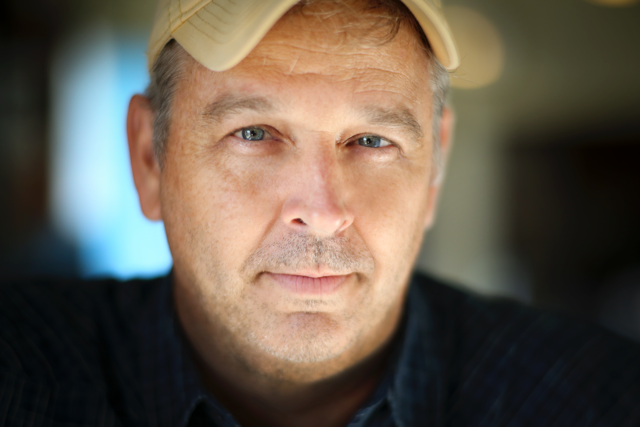
- Born: May 4, 1967 (age 59); Chicago, Illinois, U.S.
- Education: University of Notre Dame (BA); American Film Institute (MFA)
- Occupations: Independent documentary filmmaker, actor
- Years active: 1977–present
- Spouse: Christine O'Malley (2000)
- Children: 3

Patrick Creadon (born May 4, 1967) is an American filmmaker known for his work in documentaries. His first film, Wordplay, profiled New York Times crossword editor Will Shortz and premiered at the 2006 Sundance Film Festival. The film screened in over 500 theatres nationwide and became the second-highest grossing documentary of that year. His second film, I.O.U.S.A., is a non-partisan examination of America's national debt problem and forecast the 2008 financial crisis. I.O.U.S.A. premiered at the 2008 Sundance Film Festival and was later named one of the Top 5 Documentaries of the Year by film critic Roger Ebert.

Other works include the documentary features If You Build It (2013), the ESPN 30 for 30 film Catholics vs. Convicts (2016), and Hesburgh (2019). He also works as a commercial and television director.

== Early life and education ==
Creadon was born in Riverside, Illinois and graduated from Fenwick High School in Oak Park, Illinois in 1985. He graduated with a BA in International Relations from The University of Notre Dame in 1989, where he served as a writer and an editor for the school paper The Observer.

== Career ==
Creadon and his siblings worked as child actors in Chicago. He starred in the made-for-television special Rascals and Robbers: The Secret Adventures of Tom Sawyer and Huckleberry Finn alongside Anthony Michael Hall and Cynthia Nixon.

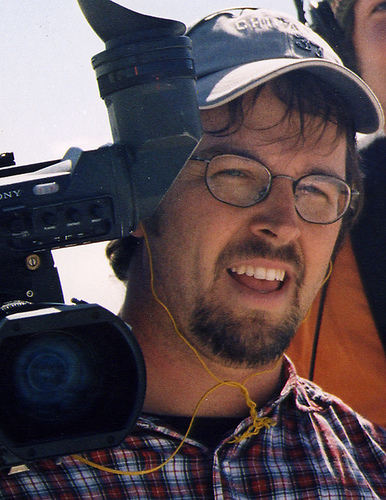
Creadon while filming in 2004

He began his filmmaking career in Chicago on The 90s, produced by Tom Weinberg and Joel Cohen. Creadon regularly shot and edited stories for the critically acclaimed weekly documentary showcase. The series was presented on PBS by WTTW/Chicago and KBDI/Denver.

In 1993, he moved to Los Angeles after being accepted to the AFI Conservatory, where he earned his master's degree in cinematography. His thesis film Tendrils (on which he served as Director of Photography) was nominated for a student Academy Award in 1997. As a cameraman, his work has appeared on NBC, CBS, ABC, MTV, VH1, and ESPN. He has also done work for Paramount Pictures, Warner Brothers, Sony, Universal Studios, and Disney.

=== Wordplay ===
Creadon's documentary Wordplay was acquired for distribution for $1,000,000 by IFC Films and The Weinstein Company after being nominated for the Grand Jury Prize at Sundance 2006. It was released theatrically on June 16, 2006. The film ran in over 500 theaters across the United States, including at least one theater in all fifty states. Wordplay went on to gross $3,100,000 in domestic box-office, then ranking it among the Top 25 highest grossing documentaries of all time.

A 2008 episode of The Simpsons, "Homer and Lisa Exchange Cross Words", is based on the film. James L. Brooks got the inspiration for the episode after watching Wordplay. "We felt both Will and Merl were very compelling, off-the-beaten-track personalities [in Wordplay], who would fit into our universe very well," Brooks said. The episode was written by Tim Long, and directed by Nancy Kruse, and guest starred crossword puzzle creators Merl Reagle and Will Shortz as themselves.

Creadon and his wife, producer Christine O'Malley, borrowed $100,000 from family and friends to make Wordplay over the course of 2005–06.

The film was a National Board of Review nomination "Best Documentary 2006", Critics Choice Award nomination "Best Documentary 2006", Grand Jury Prize nomination at Sundance "Best American Documentary 2006" and Rottentomatoes.com – "Golden Tomato Award For Best Reviewed Documentary of 2006".

=== I.O.U.S.A. ===
Creadon's second feature documentary I.O.U.S.A. premiered in the U.S. Documentary Competition at Sundance in January 2008, one of only sixteen films selected from over 950 submissions. The film is a profile of former Comptroller General David M. Walker as he and others travel the country warning of financial challenges facing the country. Also featured prominently in the film is Robert Bixby, executive director of the non-partisan Concord Coalition. It was released by Roadside Attractions and opened theatrically on August 22, 2008. In an innovative event that took place the night before, I.O.U.S.A. was simulcast live by National CineMedia to an audience of almost 45,000 in 350 theaters across the United States. Warren Buffett and others took part in the live town hall meeting immediately after the screening (also simulcast). In addition to traditional movie theaters, the film also screened on over 100 college campuses and community centers throughout the 2008 presidential campaign and after the election, including a special screening for members of Congress at the Library of Congress.

The film was on the Academy Awards Shortlist "2008 Best Documentary Feature", Roger Ebert's "Top 5 Docs of 2008", Critics Choice Award nomination "Best Documentary 2008" and a Grand Jury Prize nomination at Sundance "Best American Documentary 2008".

=== If You Build It ===
A documentary film directed by Creadon and produced by Neal Baer showing a year in the life of an innovative school in Bertie County, North Carolina. Facing a bleak economic future in the county, the Superintendent of Public Schools for Bertie, Chip Zullinger, invites Emily Pilloton and Matt Miller to create a high school shop class curriculum for the 21st century.

== Personal life ==
Creadon is married to and works with producer Christine O'Malley. They live in Los Feliz, California, with their three daughters.

In 2010, Creadon spearheaded support for documentary filmmaker Joe Berlinger during his legal battles against Chevron Corporation. Chevron sued for and won the right to gain access to all the footage Berlinger had shot during production of his film Crude. The letter, co-signed by editor Doug Blush and supported by the International Documentary Association, was signed by over 200 members of the documentary community, including over 20 Academy Award winning documentary filmmakers. Berlinger appealed the decision and won a more positive ruling in a later hearing.

== Filmography ==
Year	Film	Director	Producer	Awards / Notes
2006	Wordplay	Patrick Creadon	Christine O'Malley	-Selected as one of the Top 5 Documentaries in 2006 by the National Board of Review. -Nominated for the Grand Jury Prize at the 2006 Sundance Film Festival for Best American Documentary Film. -Won the 2006 Golden Tomato Award from Rotten Tomatoes for Best Reviewed Documentary.
2008	I.O.U.S.A.	Patrick Creadon	Christine O'Malley	
2014	If You Build It	Patrick Creadon	Christine O'Malley Neal Baer	-Won the Bright Future Award in 2014 from the Film Independent Spirit Awards, awarded to a filmmaker whose work best exemplifies a commitment to telling stories of positive change in the world.
2015	All Work All Play	Patrick Creadon	Christine O'Malley John Kessler	
2016	Catholics vs. Convicts	Patrick Creadon	Christine O'Malley	
2019	Hesburgh	Patrick Creadon	Christine O'Malley; Jerry Barca	-New York Times "Critics' Pick". -Named one of the Best Documentaries of 2019 by Entertainment Weekly.
2019	Ski Bum: The Warren Miller Story	Patrick Creadon	Christine O'Malley Jeff Conroy Joe Berry	-Won the Audience Award at the 2019 Slamdance Film Festival.
2022	The Loyola Project	Patrick Creadon	Christine O'Malley	-"Mesmerizing!" -The Chicago Sun-Times
2025	The King of Color	Patrick Creadon	Christine O'Malley	Biography of Larry Herbert, creator of the Pantone Matching System.
